= Bristol city centre =

Coordinates: 51.453632°N 2.591341°W

- Central business district
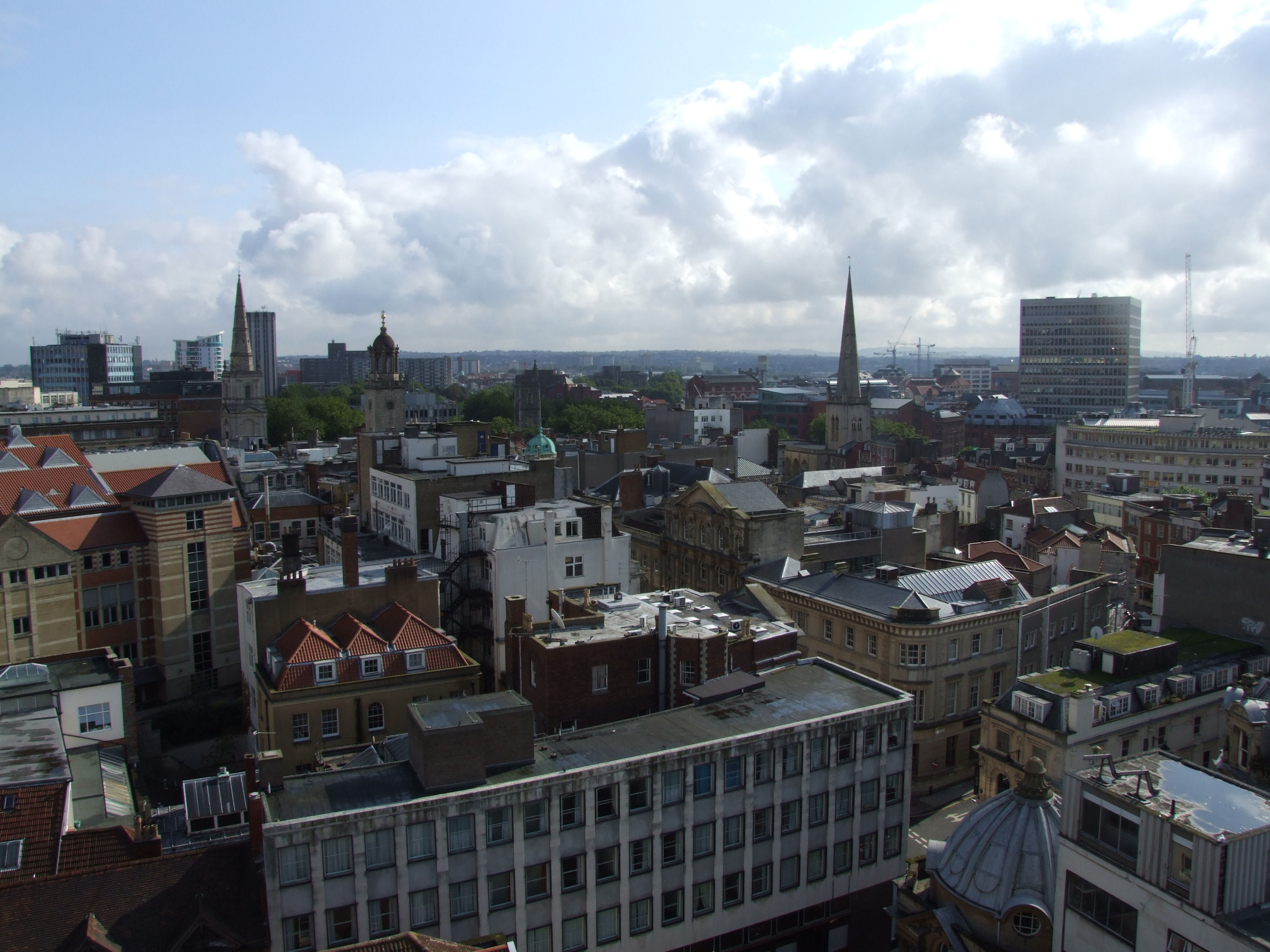
- Roofscape of central Bristol

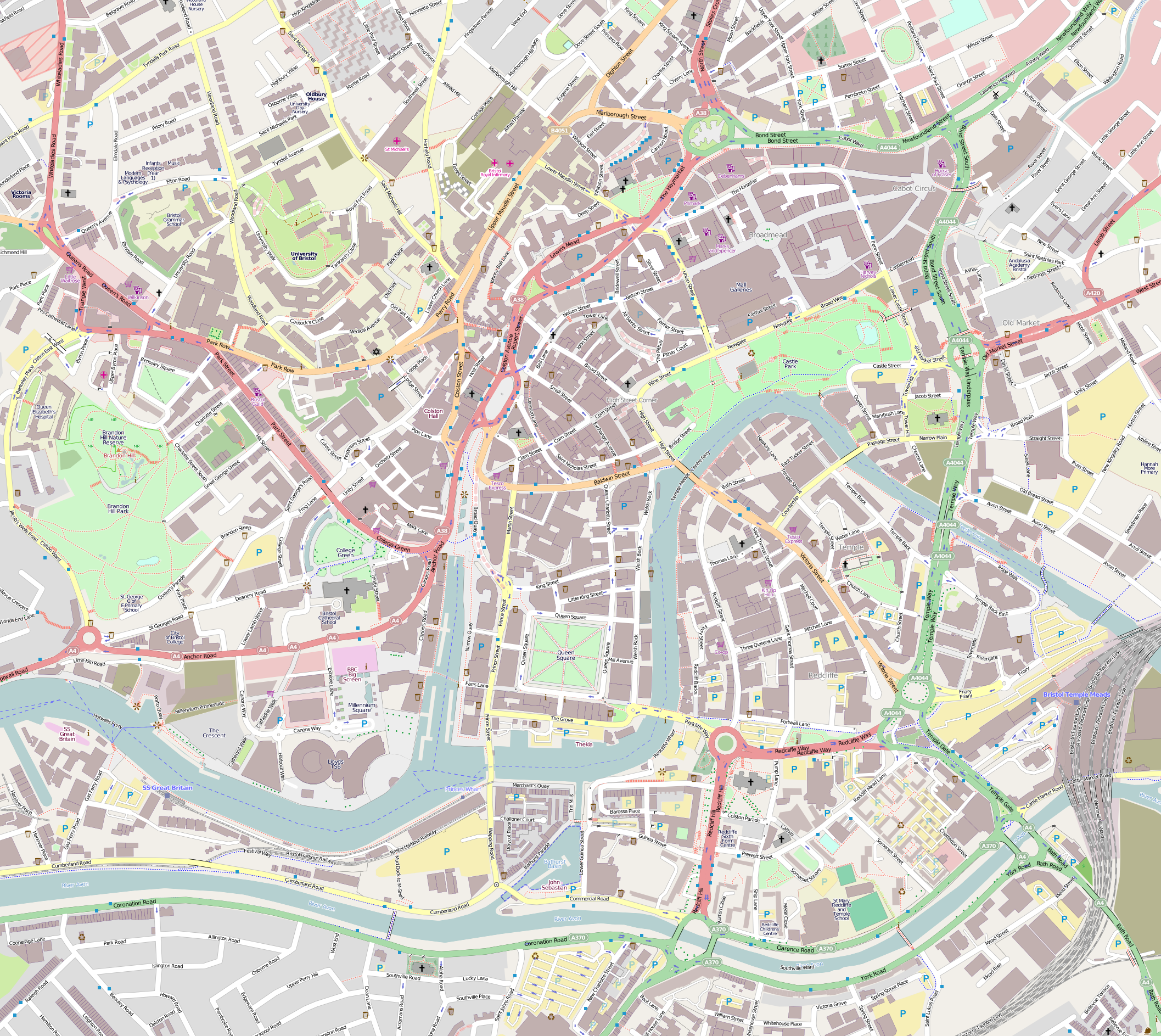
- Location within the United Kingdom
- Unitary authority: Bristol City Council
- Country: England
- Sovereign state: United Kingdom
- Post town: BRISTOL
- Postcode district: BS1, BS8
- Dialling code: 0117
- UK Parliament: Bristol West

Bristol city centre is the commercial, cultural and business centre of Bristol, England. It is the area north of the New Cut of the River Avon, bounded by Clifton Wood and Clifton to the north-west, Kingsdown and Cotham to the north, and St Pauls, Lawrence Hill and St Phillip's Marsh to the east. The Bristol Royal Infirmary, Bristol Royal Hospital for Children, BBC Broadcasting House, the main campus of the University of Bristol, Bristol Crown Court and Magistrate's Courts, Temple Meads railway station, Bristol bus station, the Park Street, Broadmead and Cabot Circus shopping areas together with numerous music venues, theatres and restaurants are located in this area. The area consists of the council wards of Central, Hotwells & Harbourside, and part of Lawrence Hill.

== Historic centre ==
The mediaeval heart of the city was immediately north of Bristol Bridge, between the River Frome and the River Avon, at the Bristol High Cross where the four cross streets High Street, Wine Street, Broad Street and Corn Street meet. The traditional view that this was also the Saxon centre was challenged in the 1970s by archaeology suggesting that Bristol's origins lay to the east of High Street in the area that is now Castle Park, but more recent Saxon finds around Small Street favour the earlier view.

This was Bristol's pre-war central shopping district, a knot of ancient narrow streets including Wine Street, Mary le Port Street and Castle Street, which was severely damaged in 1940 during the Bristol Blitz. The area to the north and west of Castle Park, around Broad Street, Corn Street and St Nicholas Market largely survived, and contains many historic buildings.

== The Centre ==
The course of the River Frome, immediately to the west of the historic centre, was covered over in stages, in the second half of the 19th century. The area became the hub of the Bristol Tramways network, and was known as the Tramways Centre. It was so called long after the last trams left in 1941, but is now known simply as The Centre.

Between 1936 and 1938, the Centre was enlarged when more of the River Frome, between Broad Quay and St Augustine's Parade, was covered in, making way for the Inner Circuit Road. The western side of the Inner Circuit Road has since been largely decommissioned, and recent works have rebalanced The Centre in favour of pedestrians, cyclists and public transport users.

== Broadmead ==
The area northeast of the historic area, around Broadmead, was redeveloped after the war despite overwhelming public opinion against it, and the streets and shops in Broadmead became the main shopping district of the city. Like many 1950s buildings in Britain, affordable but architecturally uninteresting utilitarian buildings form the bulk of the Broadmead area.

In the 1980s, some of these were demolished to make way for the Galleries shopping centre, which is a three level covered street. In 2008, the shopping area was extended over the central ring road to produce a new shopping centre, Cabot Circus, which opened in September 2008.

== Harbourside ==
The City Docks were immediately south of the Centre. Although most ships used Avonmouth Docks after the Royal Edward Dock was opened in 1908, ocean-going ships were regularly seen at the Centre until the 1960s. In 1972 the Royal Portbury Dock was opened, and the City Docks were closed. The harbour buildings, including the tobacco warehouses, became redundant.

The harbourside has been regenerated with the Arnolfini moving to its present location in 1975, the Bristol Industrial Museum opened in 1978 and the Watershed Media Centre in 1982. This development continued in the 1990s and 2000s with the opening of Canons House, refurbishment of warehouses as bars, restaurants and the creation of the At-Bristol science centre (later rebranded as We the Curious).

== Gallery ==
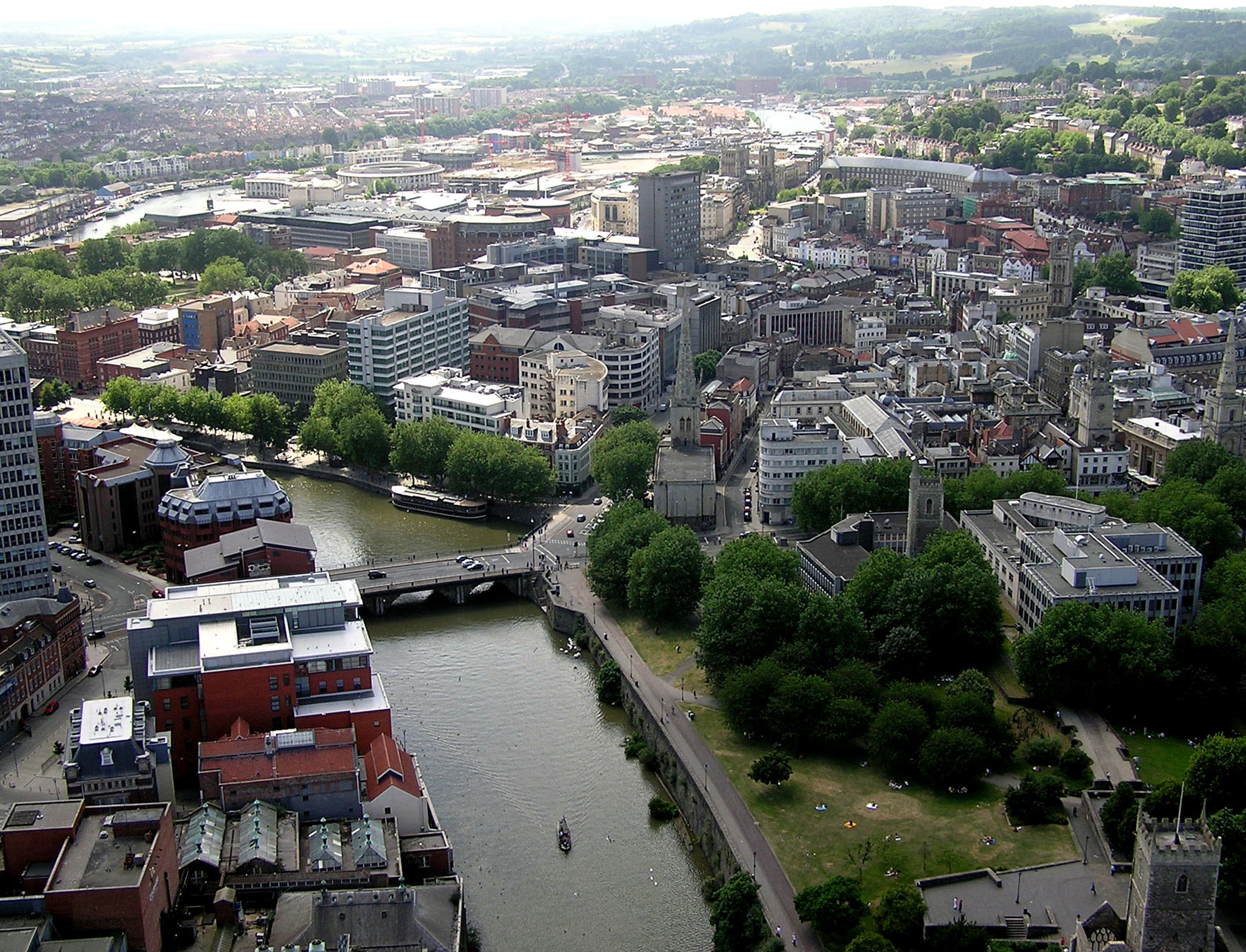
The channelled River Avon (the Floating Harbour) flows through the city centre; most of the central part of the City of Bristol is shown here

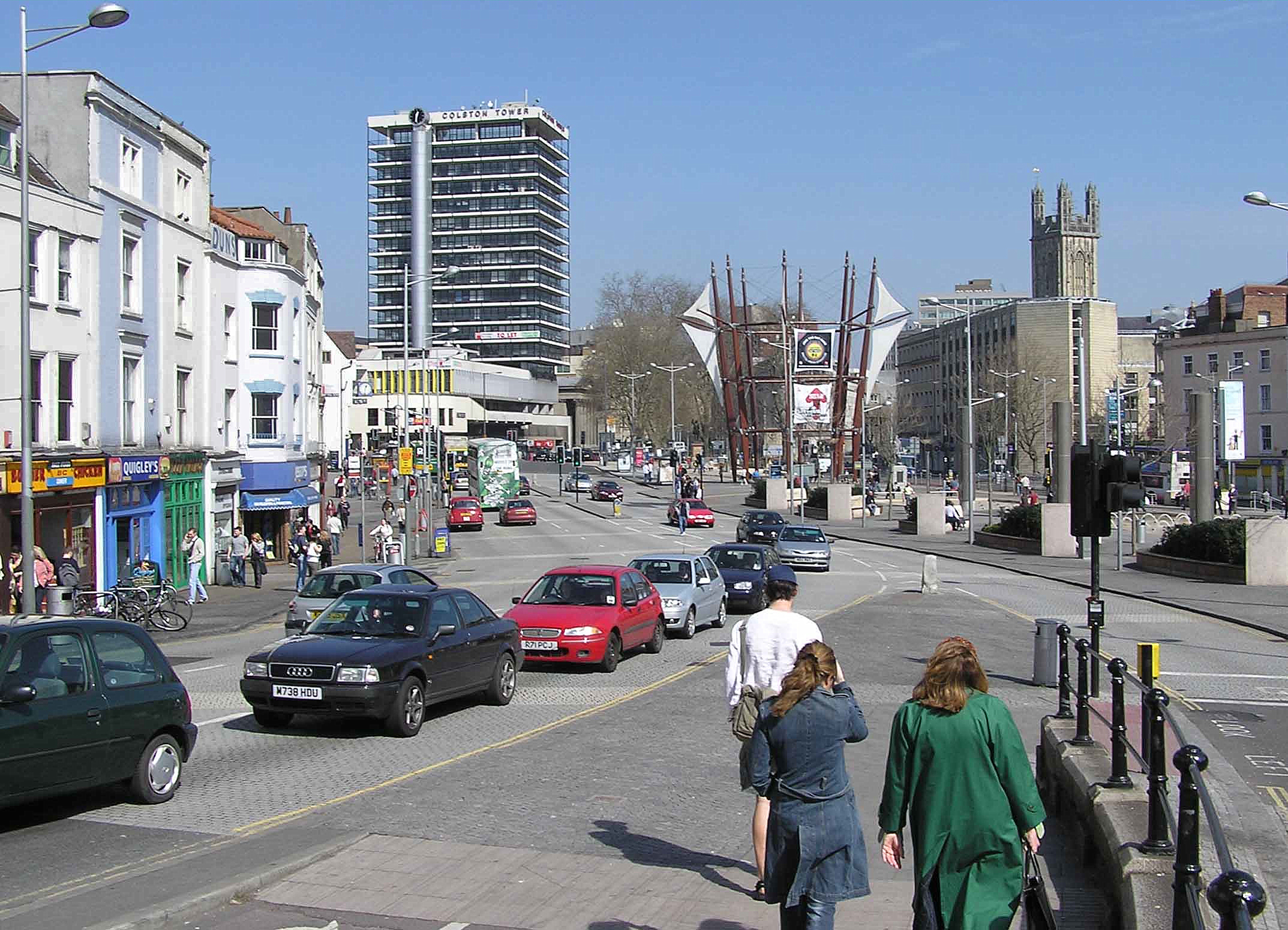
The Centre, seen from the bottom of Park Street

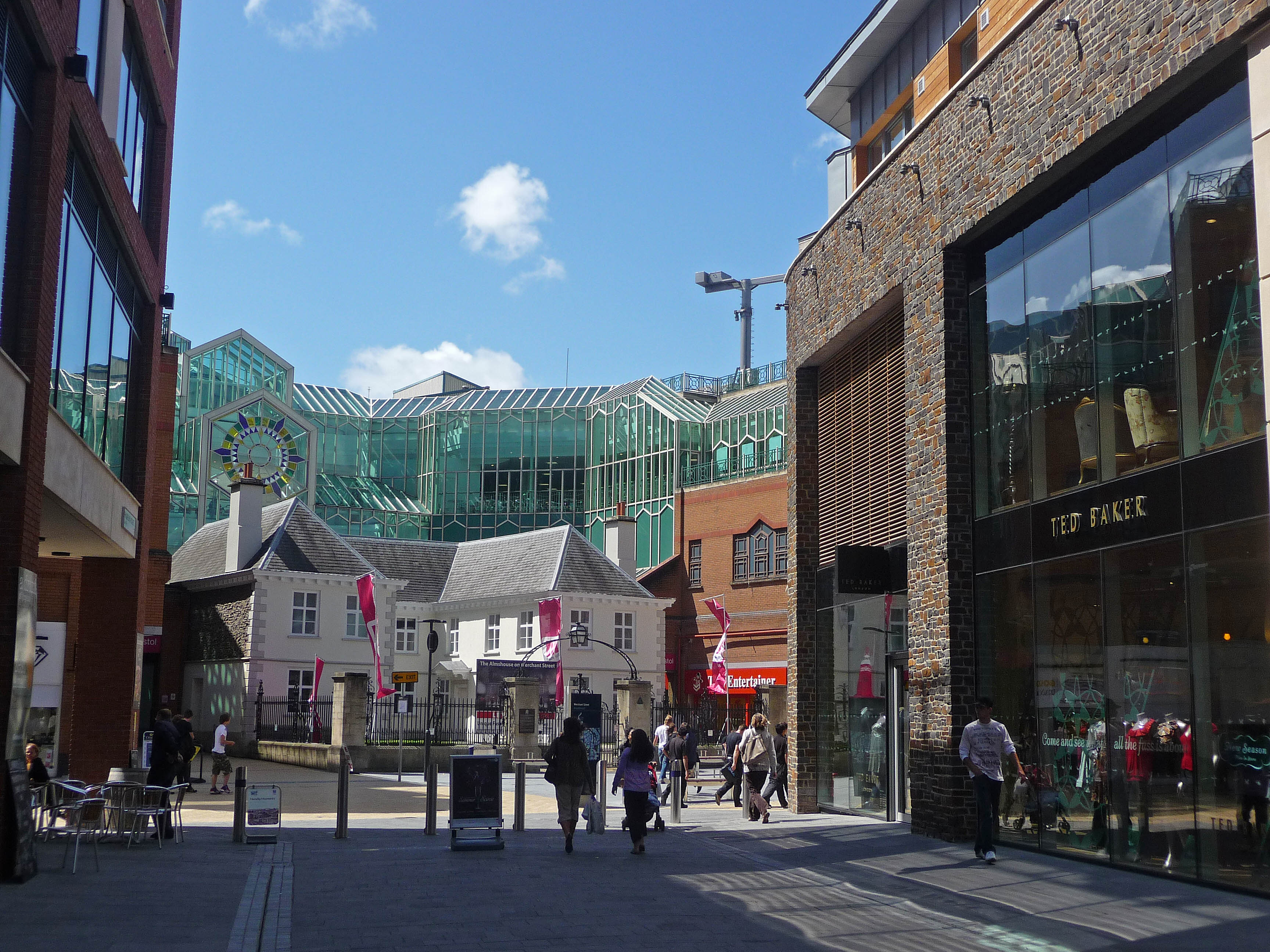
The North Entrance to the Galleries Shopping Centre, Broadmead

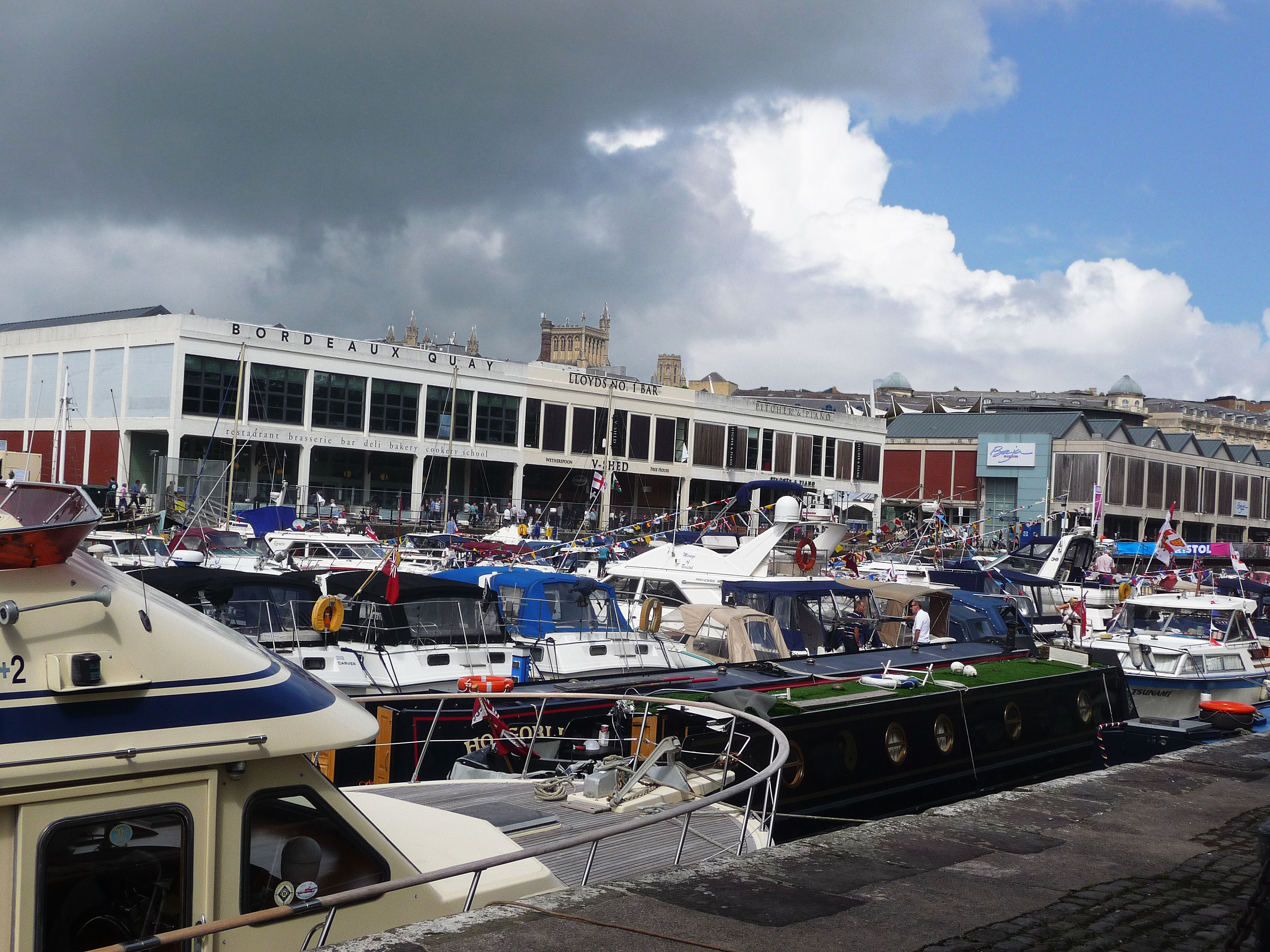
St. Augustine's Reach, Bristol Harbour

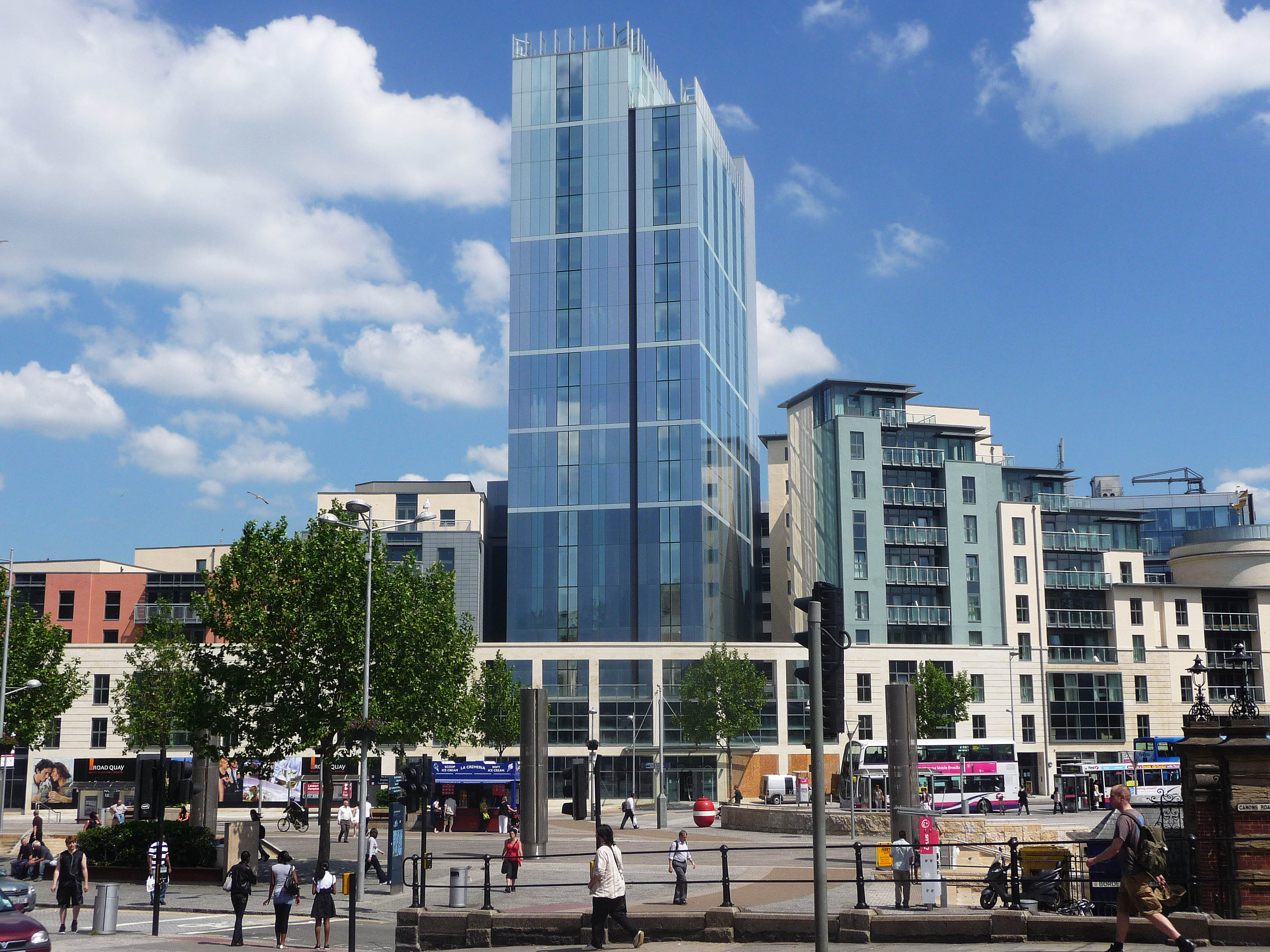
Radisson Blu Hotel and Broad Quay Serviced Apartments, The Centre

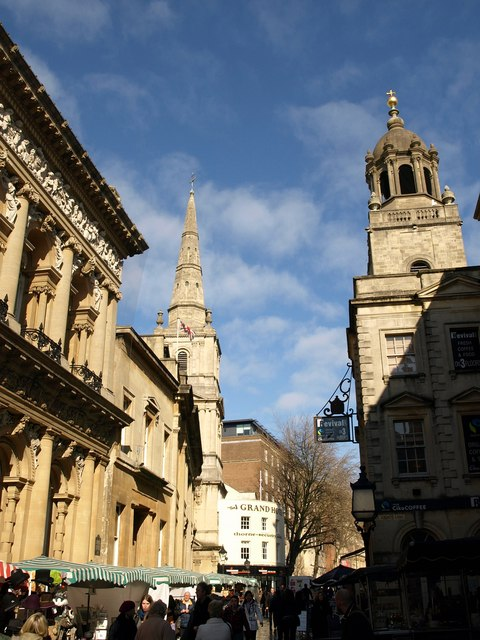
Corn Street, heart of the Old City

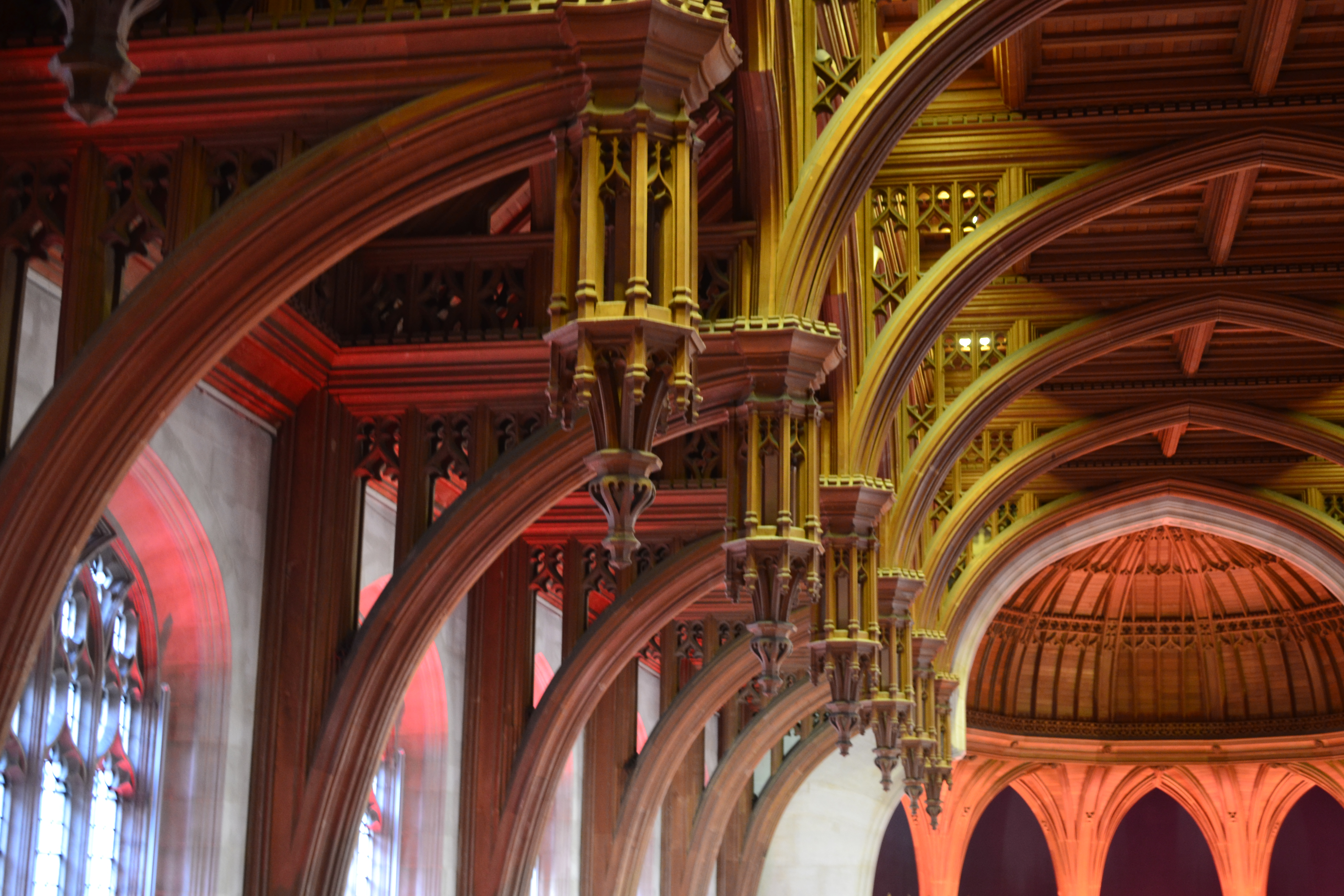
Hammerbeam roof in the Great Hall of the Wills Memorial Building, University of Bristol

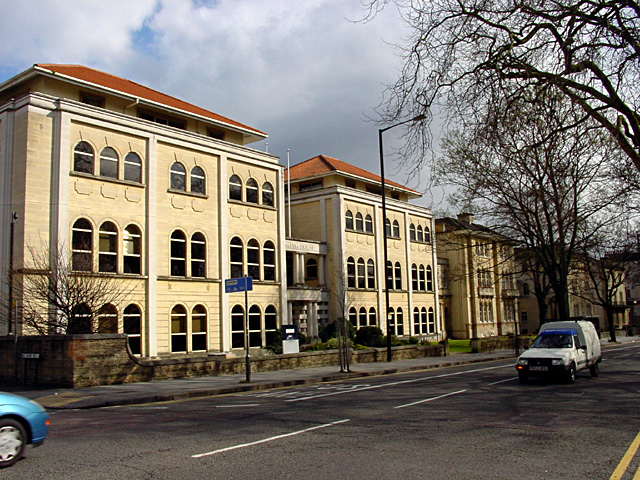
BBC Bristol TV Studios, Whiteladies Road

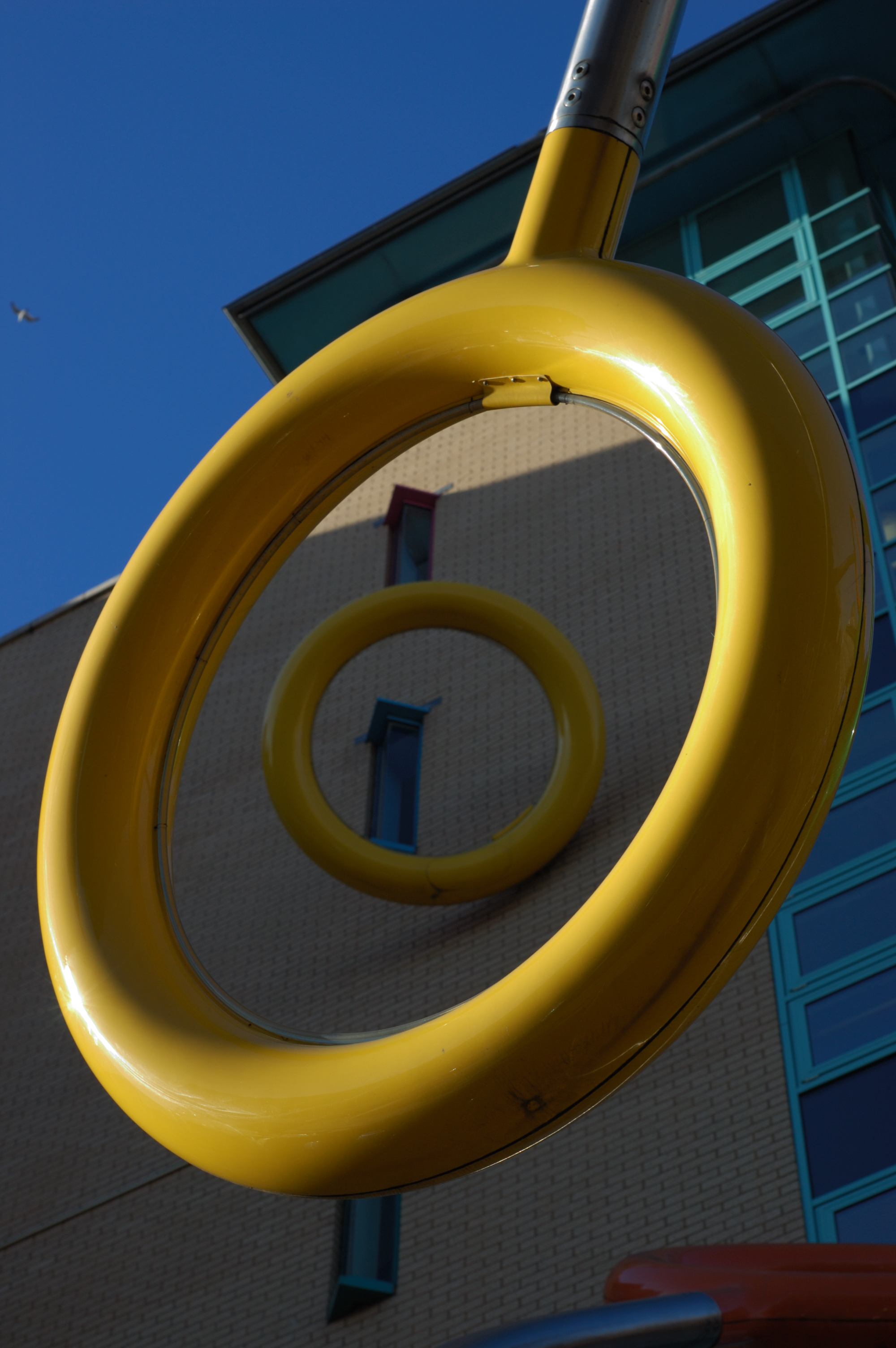
Sculpture outside Bristol Children's Hospital

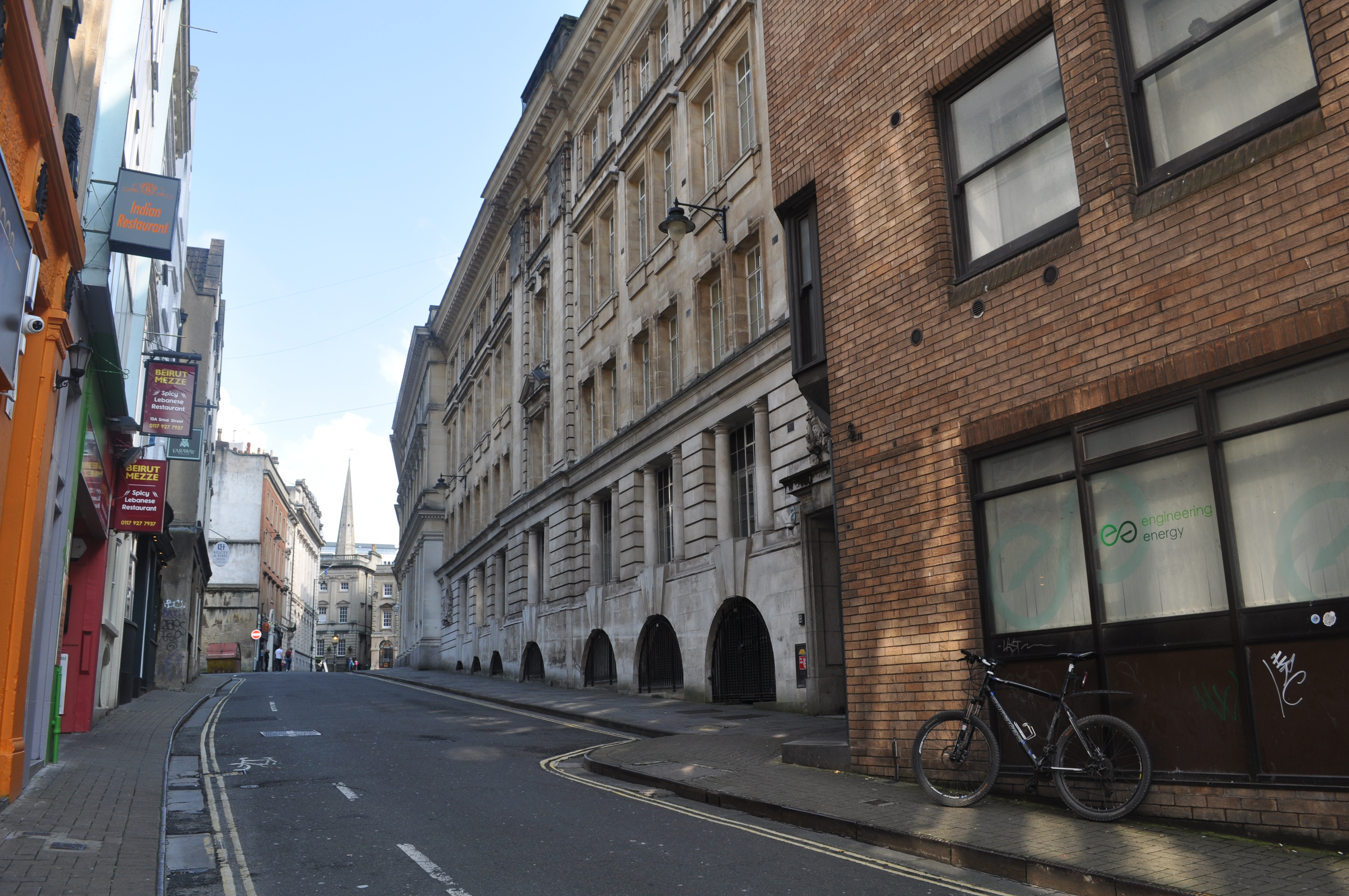
Crown Court, Small Street

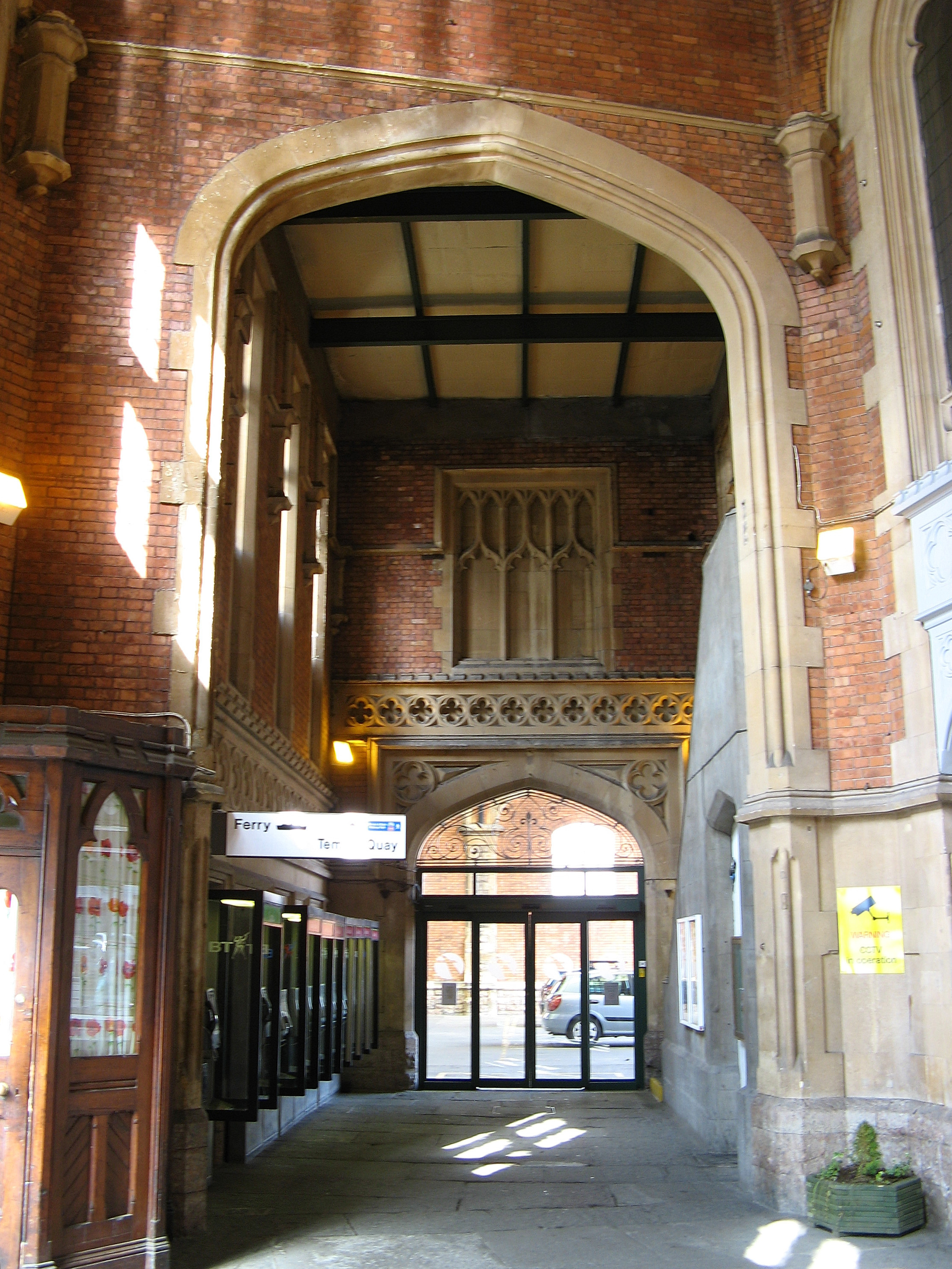
Booking Office, Temple Meads Station

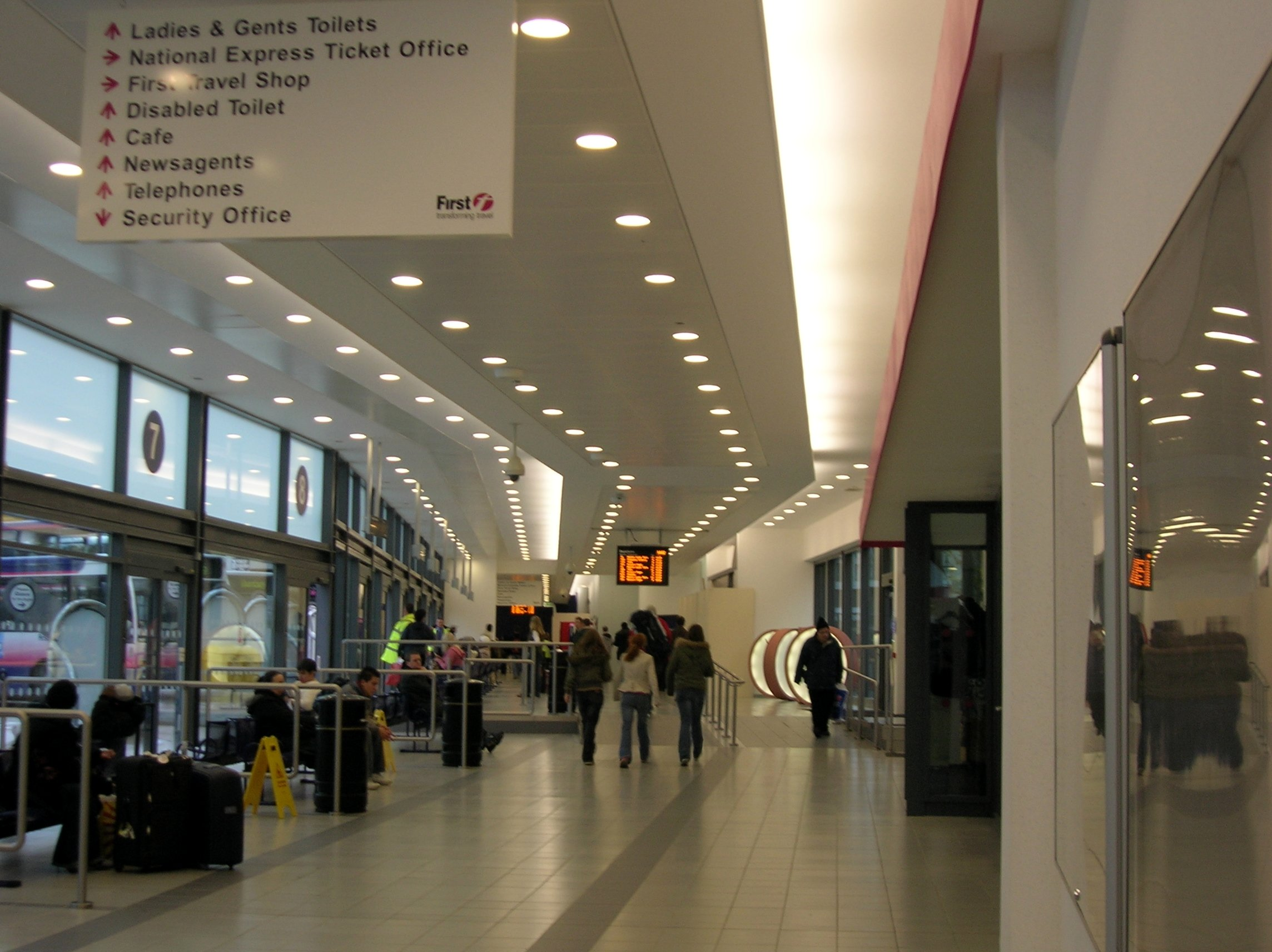
Bristol Bus Station

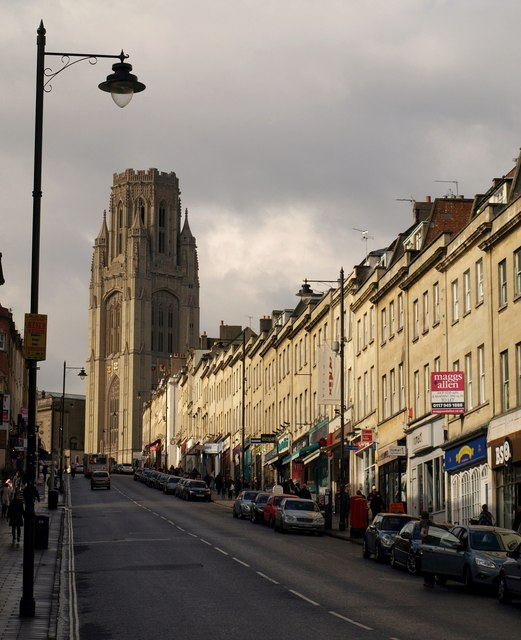
Park Street and Wills Memorial Building
