= Bristol High Cross =

Medieval monument

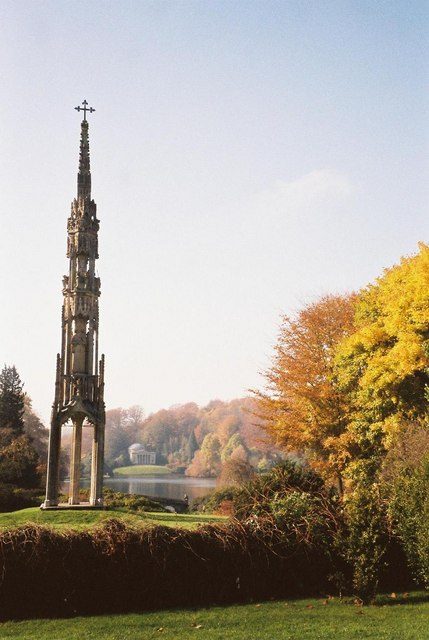
The cross is now at the entrance to the gardens of the Stourhead estate

Bristol High Cross is a monumental market cross said to have been erected c.1373 in the centre of Bristol, England, to commemorate the granting of a charter by Edward III to make Bristol a county, separate from Somerset and Gloucestershire. It was likely constructed on the site of an earlier market cross. The cross at it survives today is in Decorated Gothic style. In 1764 it was moved to the Stourhead estate in Wiltshire, where it still stands.

== Construction ==
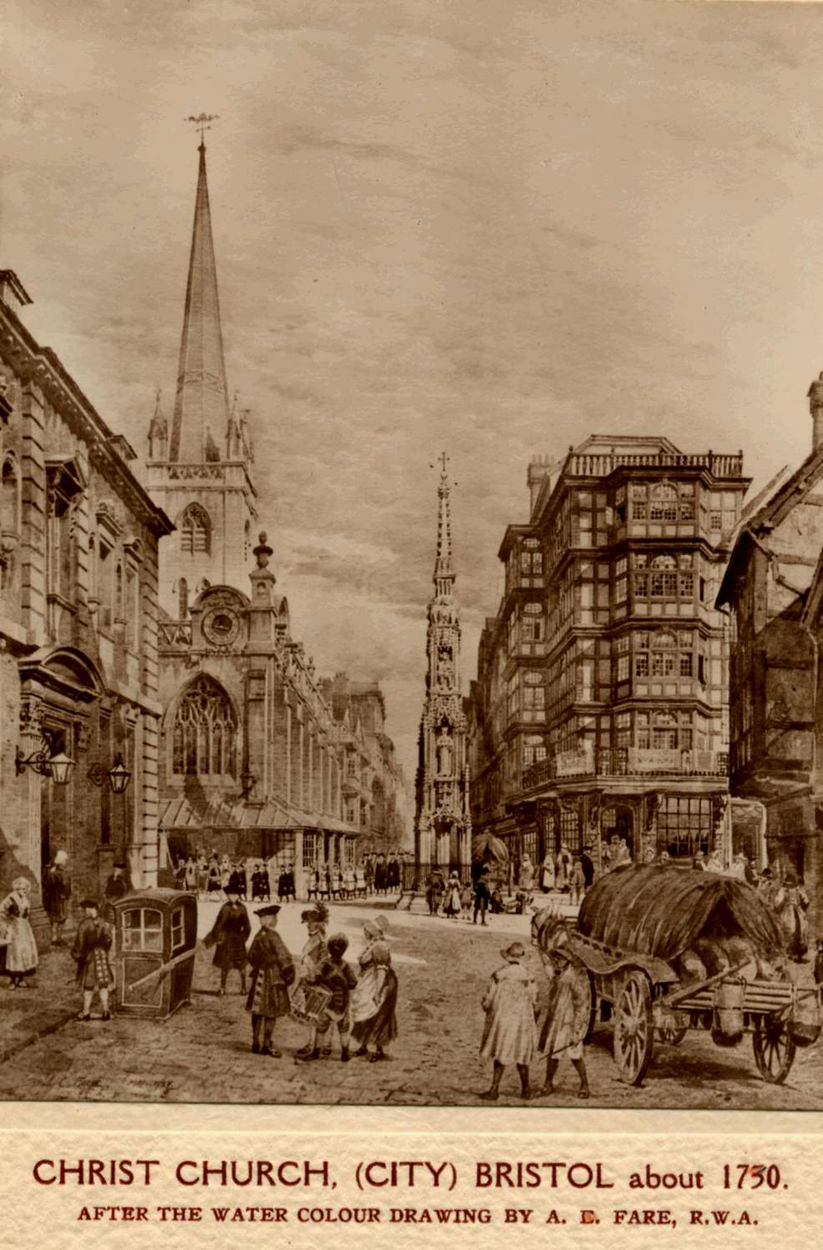
Black and white sketch from c1900 depicting 1704-1733 period, looking east from Corn Street to Wine Street, Bristol. The church tower visible is that of Christ Church with St Ewen, Bristol. On the far left of the image, on the north side of the road is the Register Office (previously the old Council House). In the centre of the junction can be seen the Bristol High Cross, and on the right of the image, on the south side of Wine Street is The Dutch House, damaged during the Bristol Blitz. The street scene shows a lot of people, a horse and cart, and a sedan chair.

The cross stood in the centre of the town, at the crossroads of its four main streets (51°27′18″N 2°35′35″W). It has traditionally been said to have been built in 1373, to commemorate the granting of county status to Bristol. However, the earliest documentary reference to the cross is in a 1403 or 1404 civic ordinance, which mentions an 'opyn place bysydes the hyecrois of Bristow'. Dating the surviving cross architecturally or archaeologically is problematic, since it was renovated and rebuilt many times over the following centuries. For instance, in 1525 the mayor of Bristol ordered that 'the heddes of the crosses at the galowes [Bewell's Cross] and markett place [High Cross] shuld be made of the newe, as they nowe be'.

The most substantial and best documented alteration took place in 1633–1634, when the cross was partially dismantled and repaired, with a new storey added in which four seated figures were placed. The base was four octagonal piers with cusped ogee arches. The next two tiers contained alcoves with statues of English monarchs. The top tier was a pinnacle with the actual cross as a finial. The material was oolitic limestone but, as this was susceptible to frost damage, this was subsequently painted in colours of blue, gold, red and vermilion. The vermilion was the predominant colour of the statues, being used for their dresses, and aged well.

== Location ==
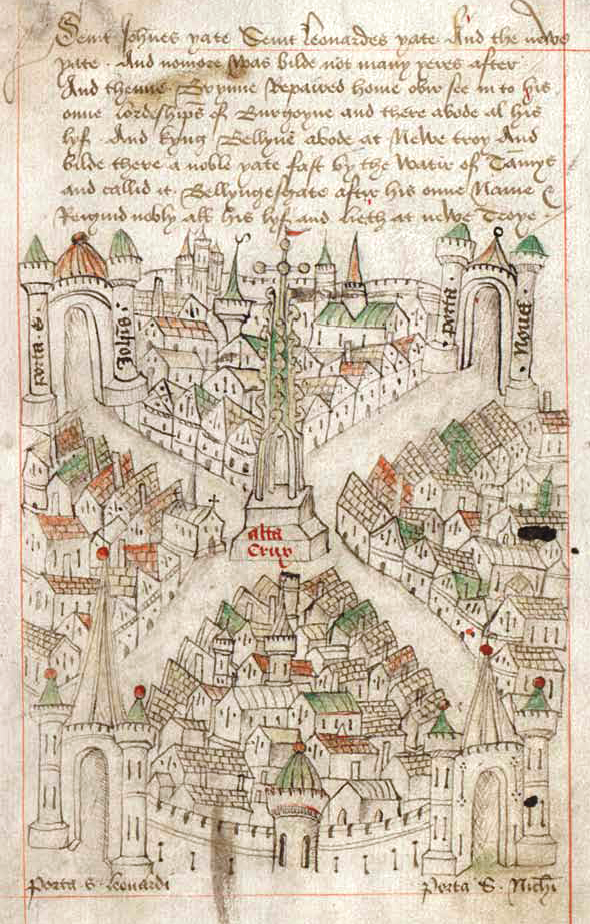
The cross is shown at the centre of Robert Ricart's map of Bristol, in the ms. The Maire of Bristowe is Kalendar. He was the common clerk of the town from 1478 to 1506, and his drawing was the first such plan of an English town.

The base of the cross displayed statues of monarchs in alcoves. In 1663, the cross was rebuilt to add a third tier for four more statues and the total complement of eight was then:

- North, facing Broad Street—King John; Charles I
- East, facing Wine Street—Henry III; Henry VI
- West, facing Corn Street—Edward III; Elizabeth I
- South, facing High Street—Edward IV; James I

The cross's central location made it the natural place for special events. In 1399, supporters of Richard II were beheaded there by order of Henry Bolinbroke, after a short siege of Bristol. These included Richard's Lord High Treasurer, William le Scrope, Sir John Bussy and Sir Henry Green. The following year, Thomas le Despenser, 1st Earl of Gloucester, was beheaded there for his part in the Epiphany Rising against Bolinbroke who was now King Henry IV.

In 1487, it was the scene of ceremonies to greet Henry VII when he visited Bristol. In 1542, Bristol was proclaimed a bishopric at the cross. In 1554, Queen Mary and King Philip were there proclaimed joint sovereigns over England. In 1603, James I was proclaimed King of England by recorder George Snigge and the city dignitaries standing at the cross in their finery. It was also used as a site for public punishment, as can be seen from James Millerd's 1673 depiction of the High Cross, which shows a man sitting in the city stocks next to the Cross.

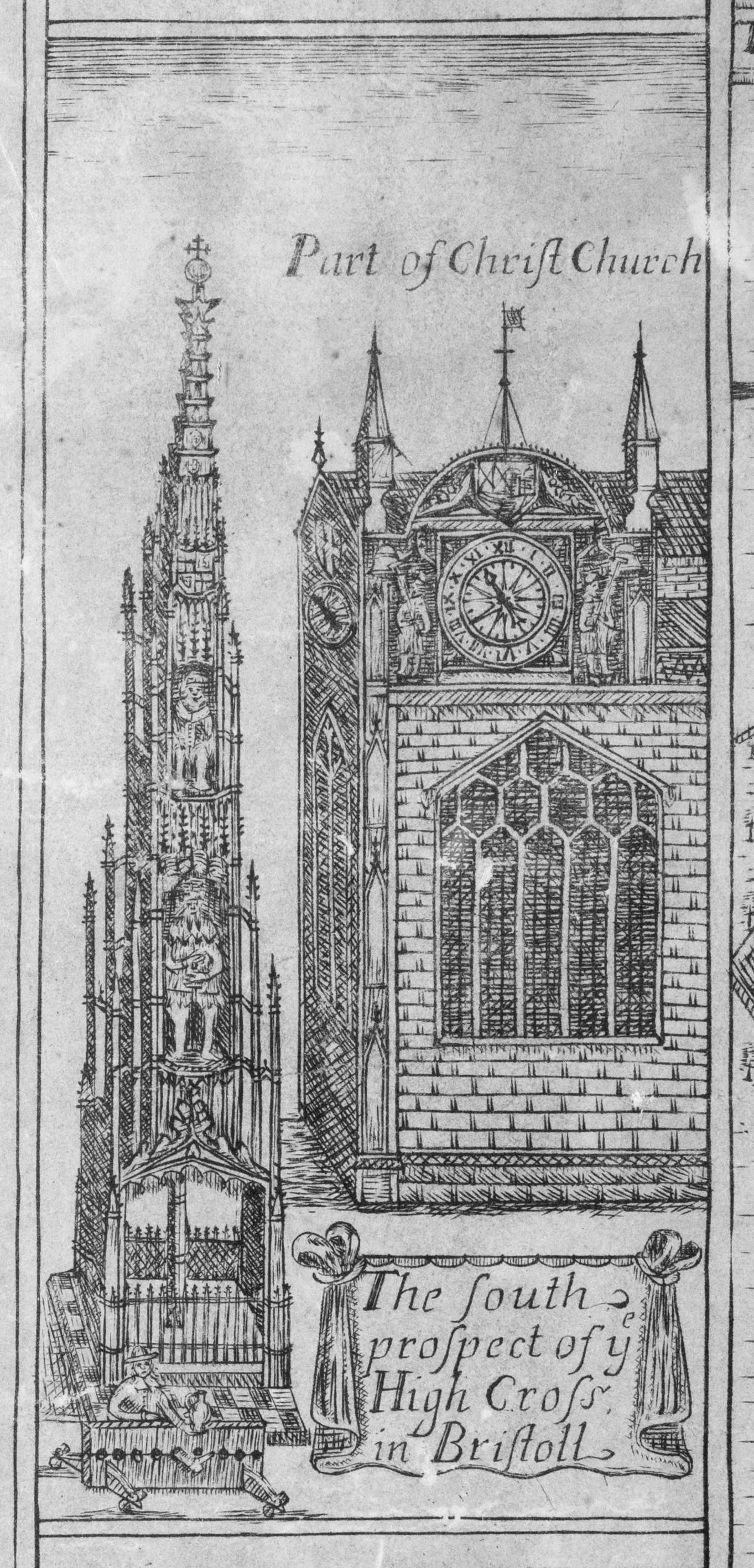
The south prospect of the cross (1673)

== Relocation ==
The cross in its second location beside the cathedral, by Samuel Scott c.1750

As Bristol prospered, the cross became an obstruction to traffic. In 1733, a council meeting recorded the complaint that it was too associated with Catholicism (“Consider that we are protestants, and that popery ought effectually to be guarded against in this Nation… a ruinous and superstitious Relic, which is at present a public nuisance”) and in the same year a nearby silversmith, John Vaughan, (who occupied the building later known as the Dutch House) complained that the cross threatened his life and property whenever there was a high wind and so persuaded the magistrates to have the cross taken down. The parts were stored in the guildhall until Alderman Price and other citizens arranged for it to be erected again in spring 1736 on College Green by the cathedral. It was there admired as a quaint antiquity but it only took thirty years for it once again to be thought an obstruction. This time, the complaints came from the visitors who had come to the spa of Hotwells. They were wont to promenade on the green in line abreast and the cross impeded the great numbers so inclined – lines of eight or more. A fund was collected to improve the green as a promenade but this was exhausted in raising the green. The cross was once again removed in August 1762, and the pieces of the cross lay disassembled in the great cloister of cathedral. In October 1764, Dean Cutts-Barton then gave it to Henry "the Magnificent" Hoare and the materials except the very worn lower columns were carted away to adorn his grand estate of Stourhead in Wiltshire, where it was rebuilt in 1765. It remains there now in the care of the National Trust.

== Replica ==
The replica on College Green in 1890, by Charles Hern

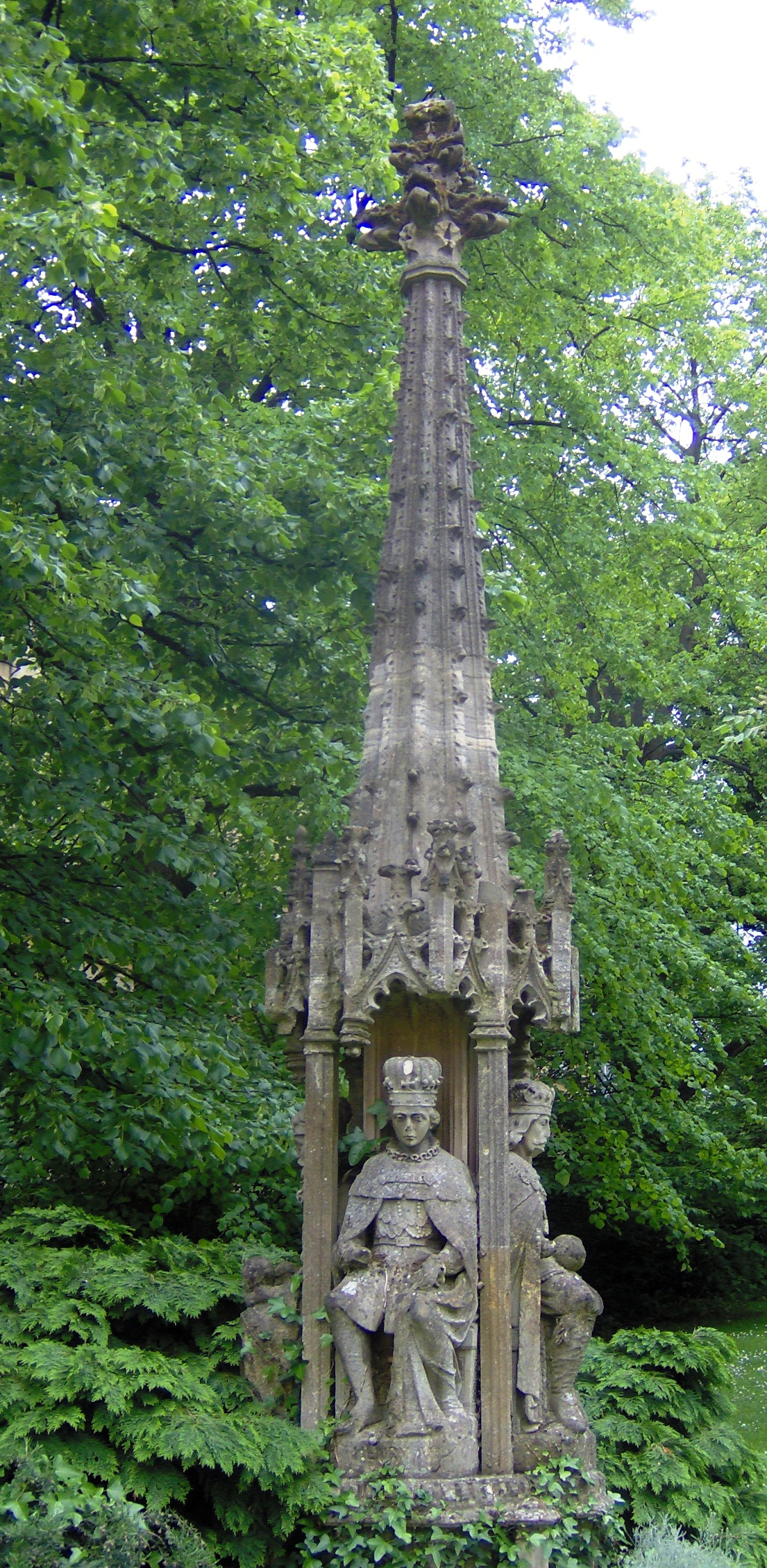
The surviving piece, now in Berkeley Square, Bristol

The Victorian citizens of Bristol sought to regain their cross but the original was now too fragile to be moved again. In 1851 they commissioned architect John Norton to build a replica which would again stand upon College Green. Norton inspected the original closely to copy its design and then engaged John Thomas, the celebrated mason and stone carver who had recently worked upon the new Palace of Westminster, to construct the body of the cross. The funds for the work were exhausted after only one statue had been completed – of Edward III – and so the replica stood for many years with the other alcoves remaining empty. The remaining statues, commissioned from a prolific craftsman of the region, Harry Hems, were eventually installed in 1889, after the cross had been moved from the apex to the centre of the green to make way for the new jubilee statue of Queen Victoria.

Because the architect of the new Council House did not want anything in front of his new creation, the 1851 replica cross was taken down in 1950. The upper stage of the replica was saved by fundraising and re-erected during a small ceremony in 1956 in nearby Berkeley Square in Bristol.

== Statues ==
A statue of Edward III from the High Cross exhibited at the British Library

Four of the statues of the original cross at Stourhead were replaced by replicas in 1980, with the originals placed on indefinite loan with the Victoria and Albert Museum in London.

== Bibliography ==
- Michael J H Liversidge, The Bristol High Cross (Bristol Historical Association pamphlet, no. 42, 1978) 21 pp. – via Internet Archive

== See also ==
- Bewell's Cross
