= Charles Hern =

Charles Edward Hern (1848–1894) was an English painter who worked with watercolours. He moved to Australia in 1873 for about ten years but returned to England before his death.
