= High Street, Bristol =

Street in central Bristol, England

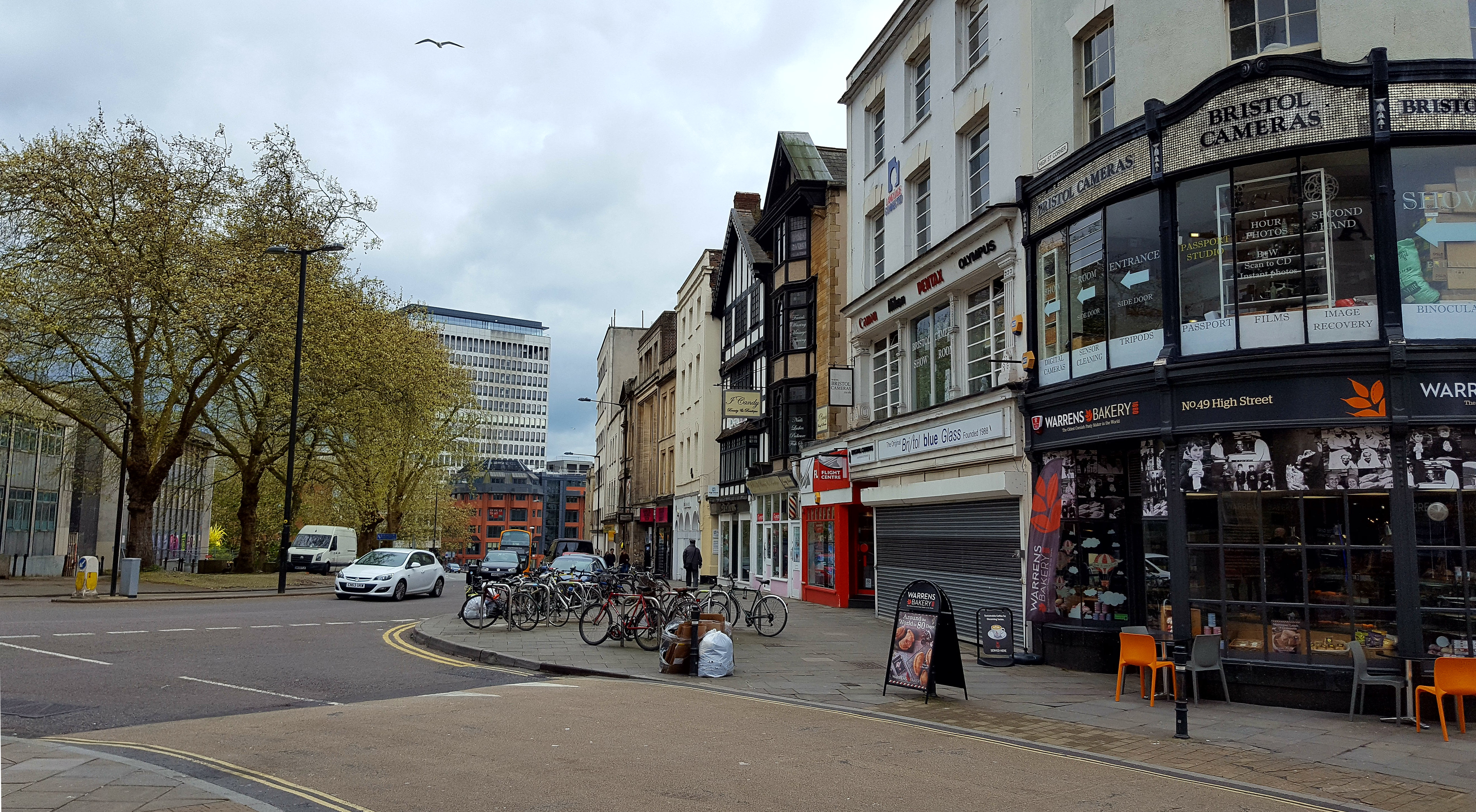
- High Street, Bristol, looking from the central crossroads towards Bristol Bridge.

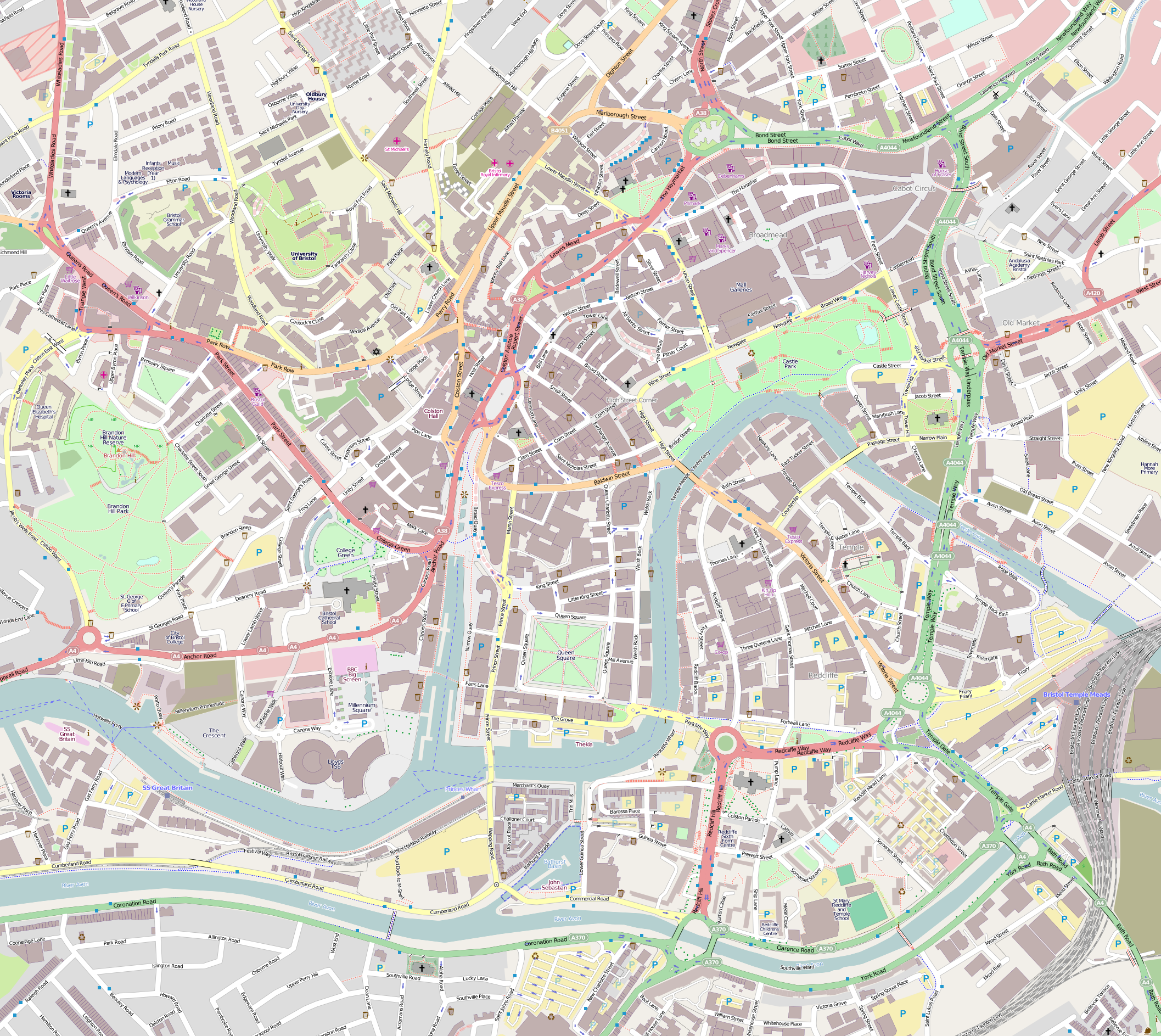
- Location within Bristol Central
- Maintained by: Bristol City Council
- Location: Bristol, England
- Postal code: BS1
- Coordinates: 51°27′16″N 2°35′33″W
- North: Broad Street
- East: Wine Street
- South: Bristol Bridge
- West: Corn Street

High Street, together with Wine Street, Broad Street and Corn Street, is one of the four cross streets which met at the carfax, later the site of the Bristol High Cross, the heart of Bristol, England when it was a walled medieval town. From this crossroads High Street runs downhill south-east to Bristol Bridge, a distance of approximately 155m.

Once an important shopping street, wartime destruction and post-war planning have left High Street shabby and a constraint on pedestrian movement between the Old City and Castle Park. Bristol City Council are now seeking to redevelop the area to repair this.

== History ==
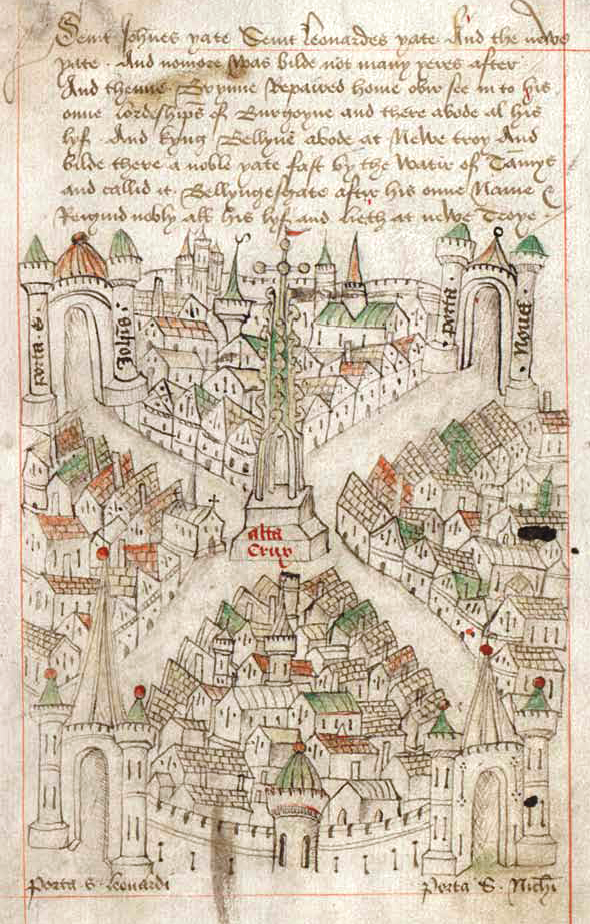
Robert Ricart's map of Bristol in 1479. High Street is shown running south-east from the High Cross (Alta Crux)

High Street, together with Corn Street, Broad Street and Wine Street, formed the earliest nucleus of Bristol. It is shown clearly on Ricart's Plan, one of the first English town plans, with the High Cross at its top and St Nicholas Church (which then incorporated the town's southern gate) at its foot.

The street appears to have changed little by the time James Millerd's Citty of Bristoll map was published in 1673. In 1747 the cleric John Wesley collided with a cart while passing through St Nicholas Gate on his way to a preaching engagement, and was shot over his horse's head 'as an arrow from a bow'. Neither man nor horse were hurt. It was clear however that improvement was needed, and in 1760 a bill was passed through parliament primarily to replace Bristol Bridge, but also allowing for the removal of St Nicholas Gate and the rebuilding of the church. During these works the gradient of High Street was reduced.

Puritan diarist Nehemiah Wallington describes Bristol Bridge and High Street in the 17th century as containing the chief shops of mercers, silkmen and linen drapers. Those who could not get premises on the bridge, which at that time was lined with shops, considered High Street the next best location.

By the mid-19th century shop fronts lined the slope of High Street, and development continued into the 20th century. Thomas Jones, the Pembrokeshire draper whose department store eventually became part of the Debenhams group, acquired three shops on High Street, ten on Wine Street and three on Mary le Port Street. In the 1920s the firm even tried to buy the landmark Dutch House which stood on the corner of High Street and Wine Street; when that bid failed the firm embarked on a modernisation programme which was almost complete by 1940.

The majority of buildings on the east side of High Street were destroyed by aerial bombing on 24 November 1940. St Nicholas Church, also damaged by bombing, was subsequently repaired and brought back into use.

After the war, Bristol's shopping centre was moved to Broadmead. In 1963 the few remaining buildings on the east side of High Street were demolished, the street was widened, and its junction with Wine Street was turned into a short dual carriageway which diverted traffic away from the original crossroads with Corn Street and Broad Street.

Post-war plans to build a riverside hotel and exhibition centre on High Street were quietly dropped on cost grounds, and new premises for the Bank of England and the Norwich Union Insurance Company were built in their place.

== High Street today ==
High Street forms part of the main north–south route through the Old City. Following its postwar widening, High Street and its junction with Wine Street constrain pedestrian movement between these streets and Castle Park.

The east side of High Street 'has a lax, dissipated air, its former tension bled away on expanses of shabby paving'. Bristol City Council is seeking redevelopment of this area, to help connect the markets area with the shopping quarter at Broadmead. This would include reducing High Street to more closely resemble its historic proportions. The redevelopment of this area 'offer[s] perhaps the greatest potential of any site in the city to demonstrate the ambition of Bristol and to realise a connected and coherent historic core'.

High Street is within the Old City and Queen Square Conservation Area.

== Sites of interest ==
- St Nicholas Church stands at the lower end of High Street near Bristol Bridge. Originally founded before 1154, the church was rebuilt in the 1760s and restored in the 1970s following bomb damage in the Bristol Blitz.
- Opposite the end of St Nicholas Street two vaulted mediaeval cellars survive on the east side of the street, accessed through an unmarked doorway.
- St Nicholas Market stands opposite the former junction of Mary le Port Street.

== Listed buildings ==
High Street has several listed buildings:

Number	Grade	Year listed	Description
	Scheduled Monument	n/a	Vault in High Street
	II*	1959	City Museum, former church of St Nicholas
31–34	Unlisted building of merit	n/a	St Nicholas House
	II*	1959	The Market, High Street
41	II	1977	41, High Street
42–43	II	1977	42 and 43, High Street
44	II	1977	44, High Street
45	II	1977	45, High Street
46a	II	1977	No 46a and attached rear area railings
47–48	II	1977	47 and 48, High Street
49	II	1977	49, High Street

High Street uses a clockwise-consecutive house numbering system, so No.1 was opposite No.49.

== Gallery ==
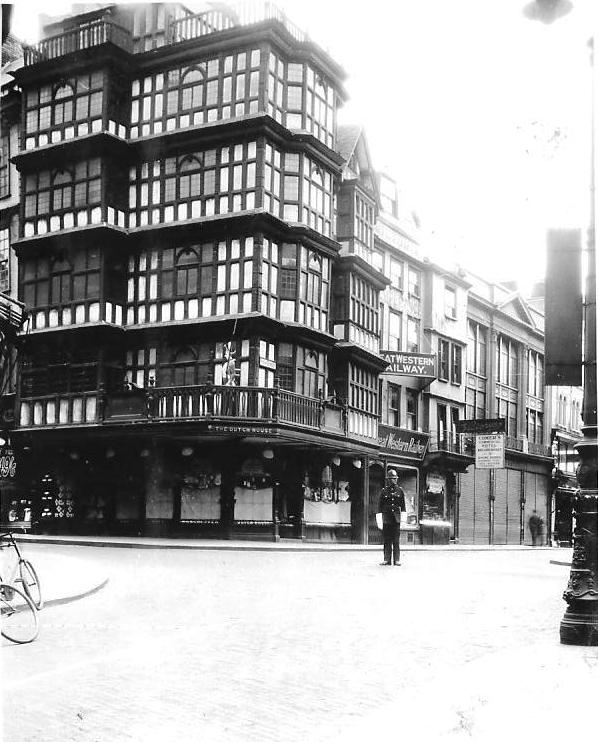
The Dutch House in 1931.

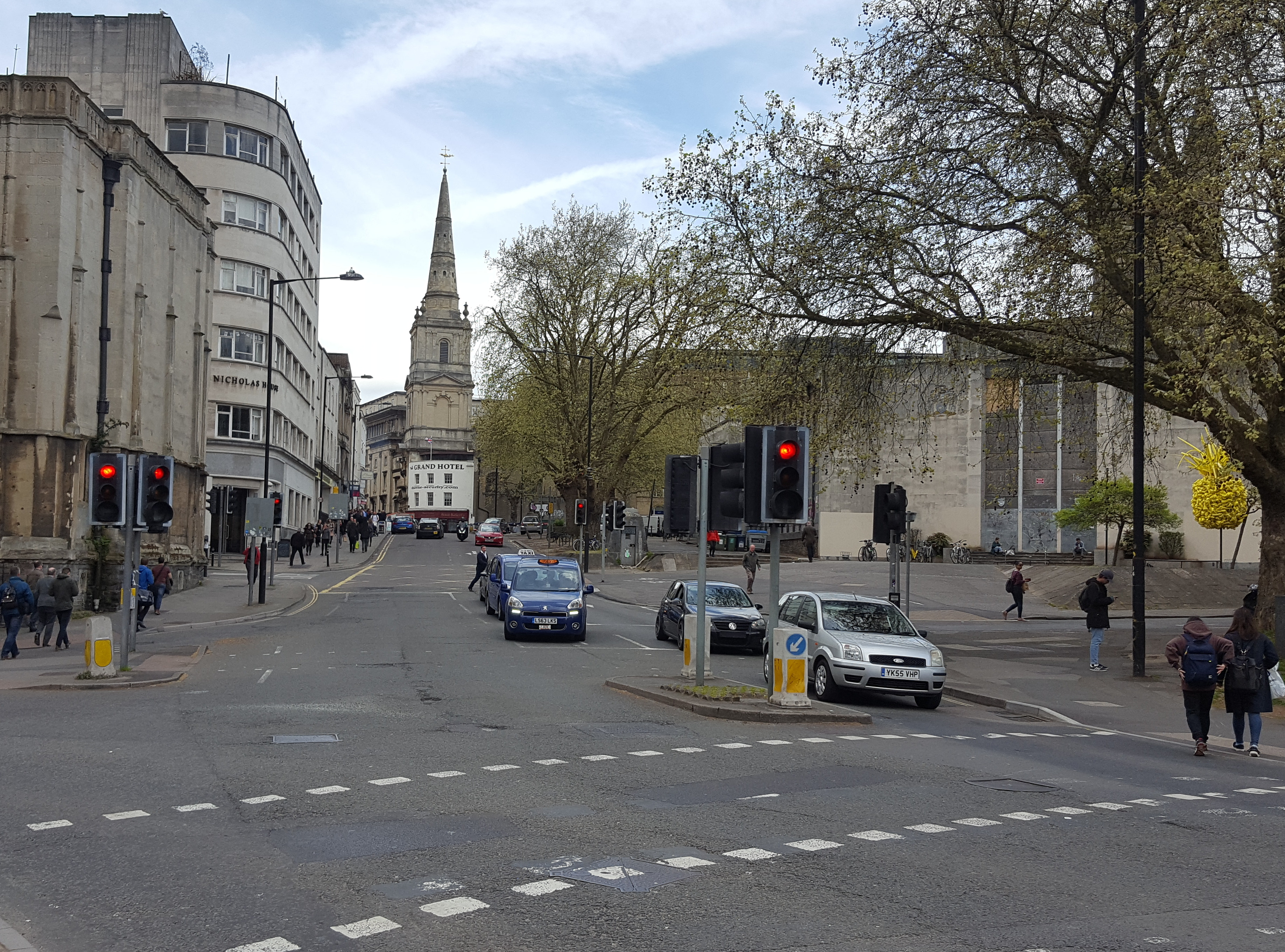
High Street, viewed from Bristol Bridge.

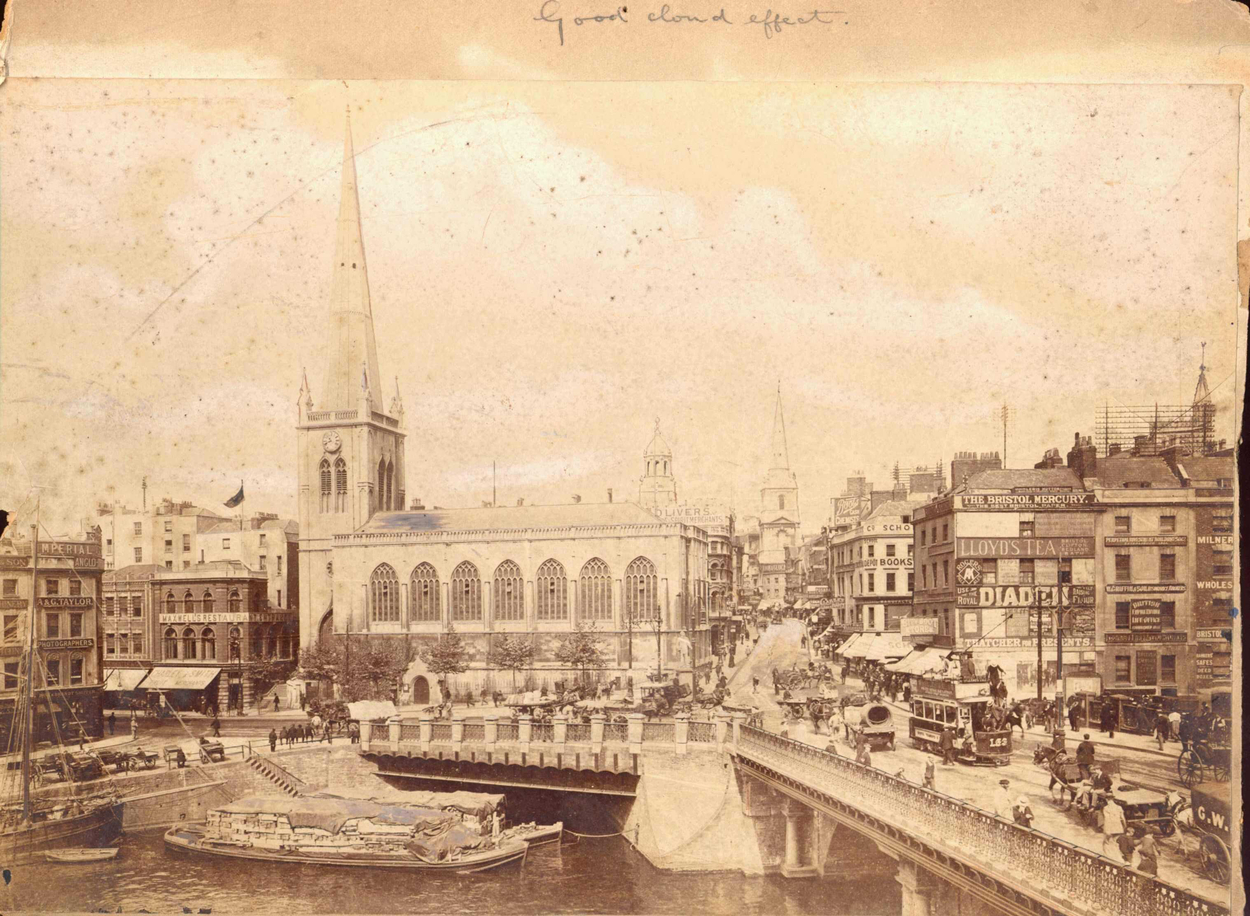
Bristol's Front Door: High Street and Bristol Bridge, c1900

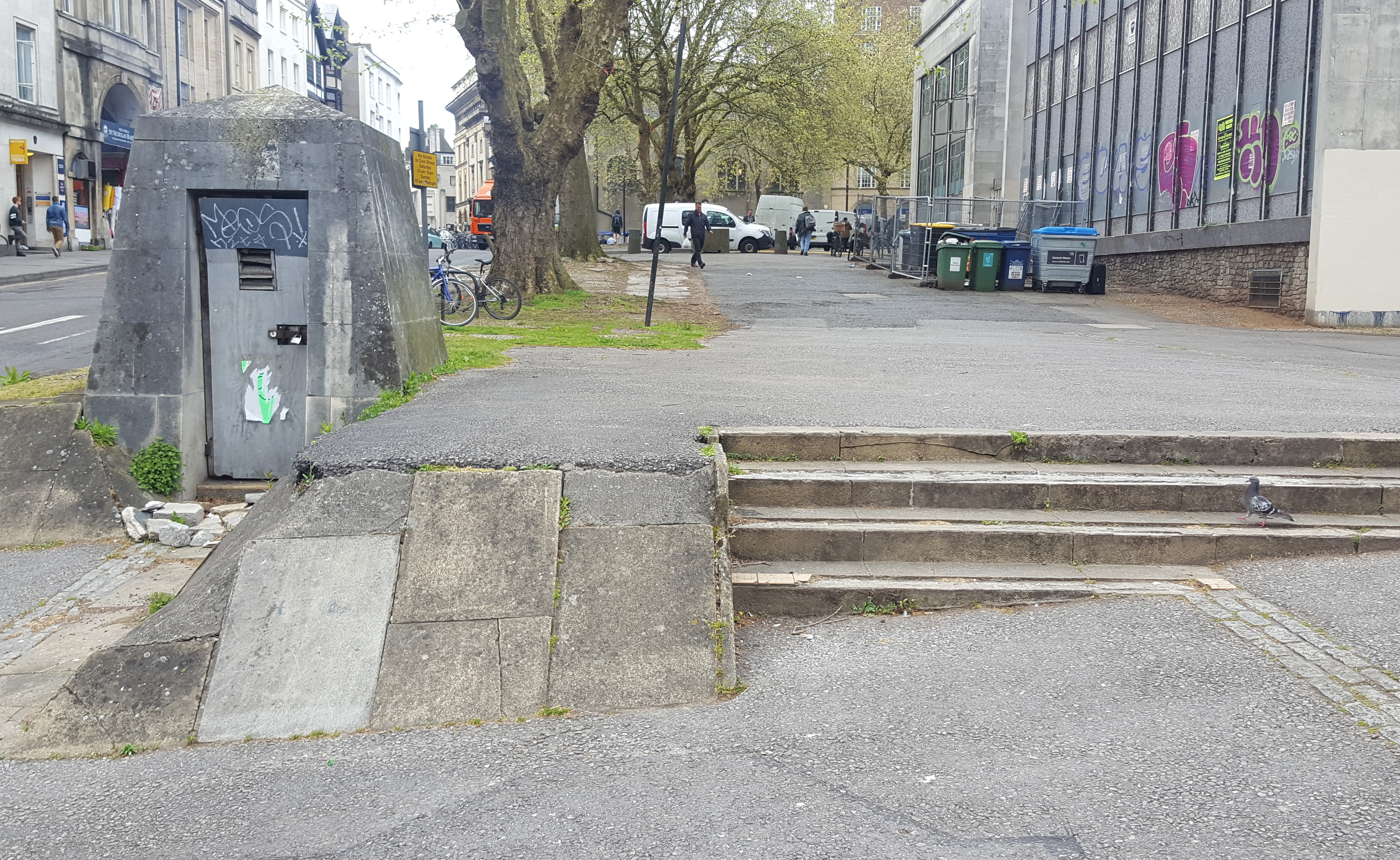
Entrance to mediaeval vaults.

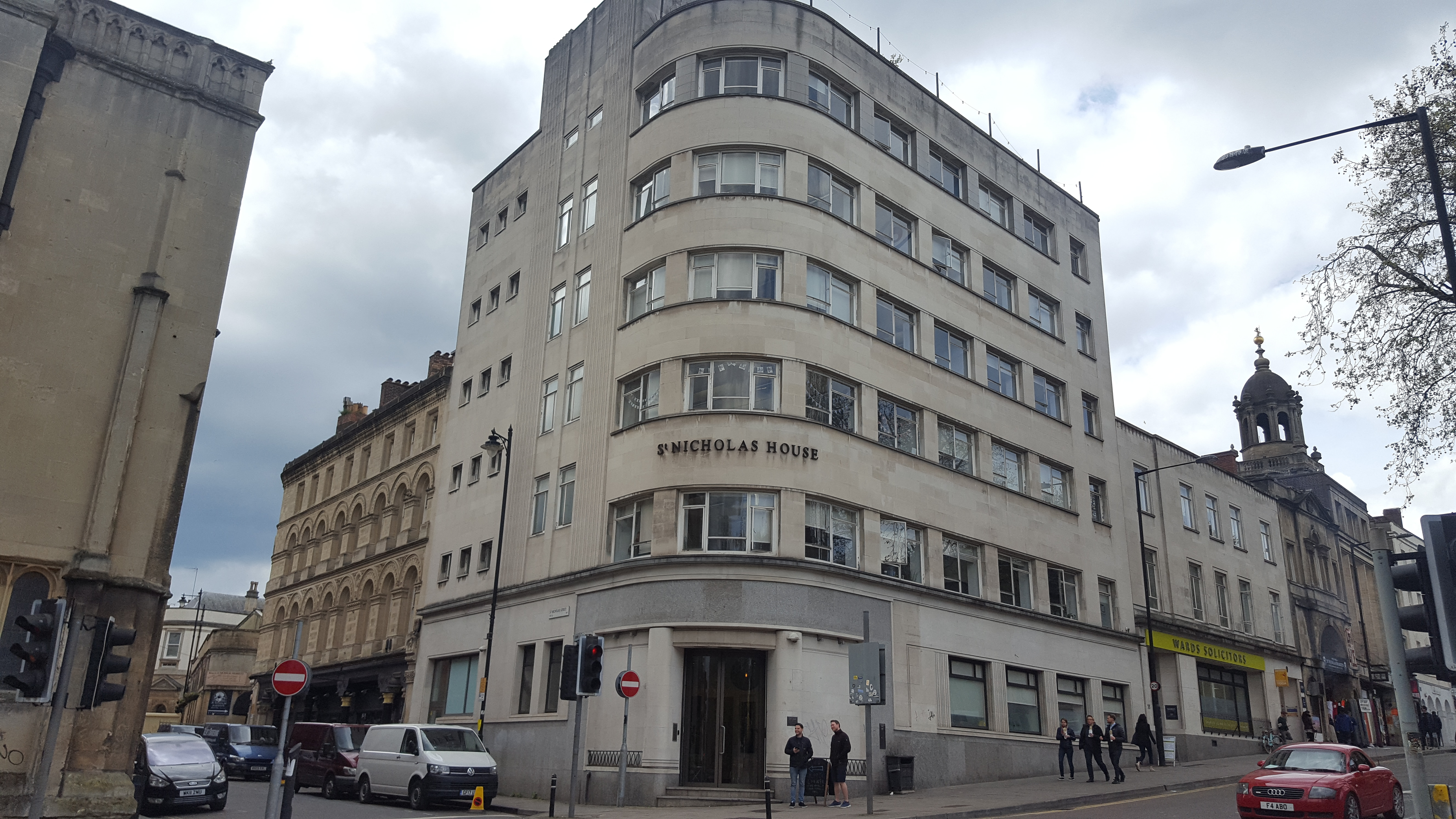
St Nicholas House.
