= Wine Street, Bristol =

Major street in Bristol, UK

Coordinates: 51°27′19″N 2°35′30″W

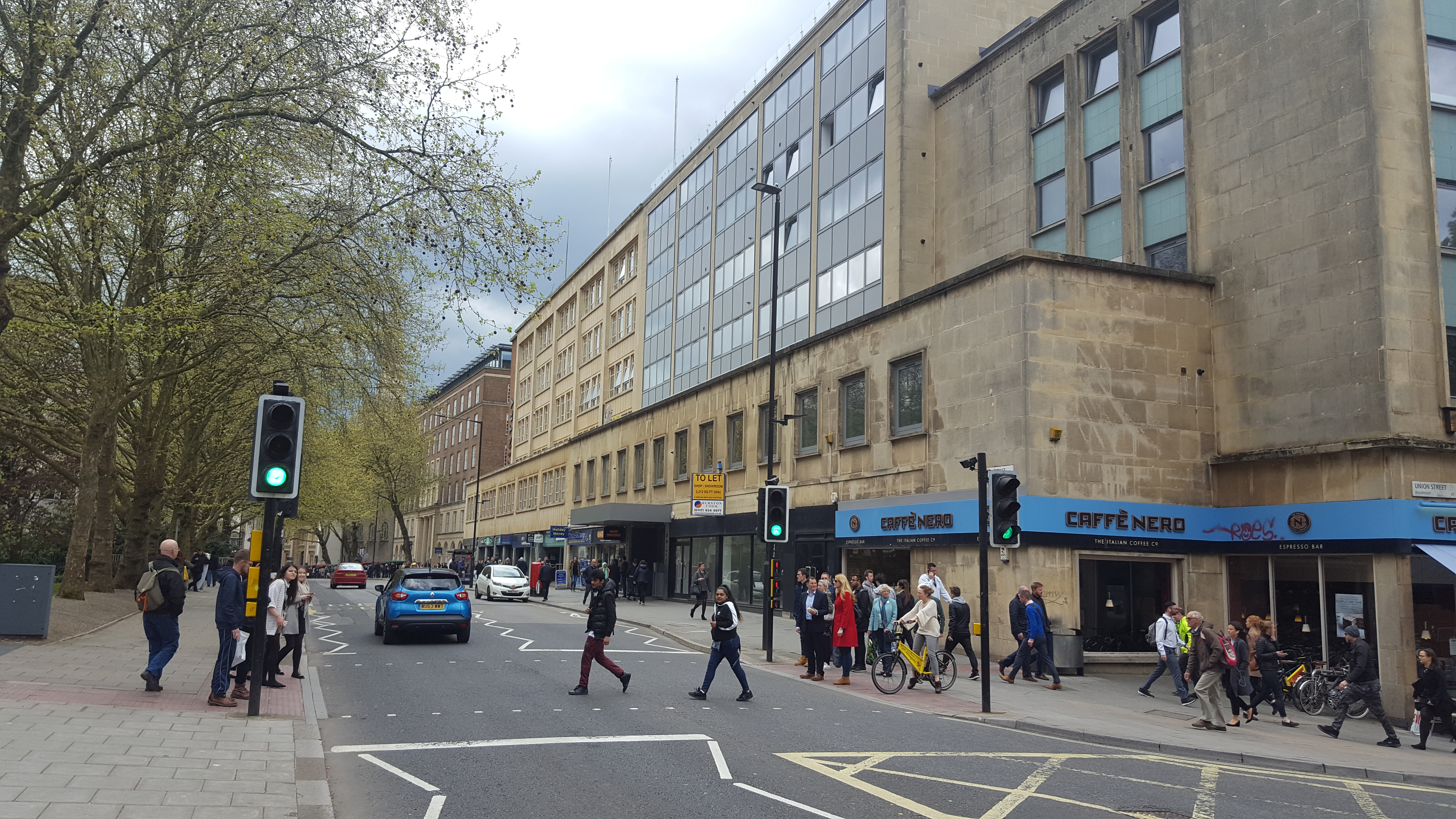
- Wine Street, Bristol, looking towards High Street

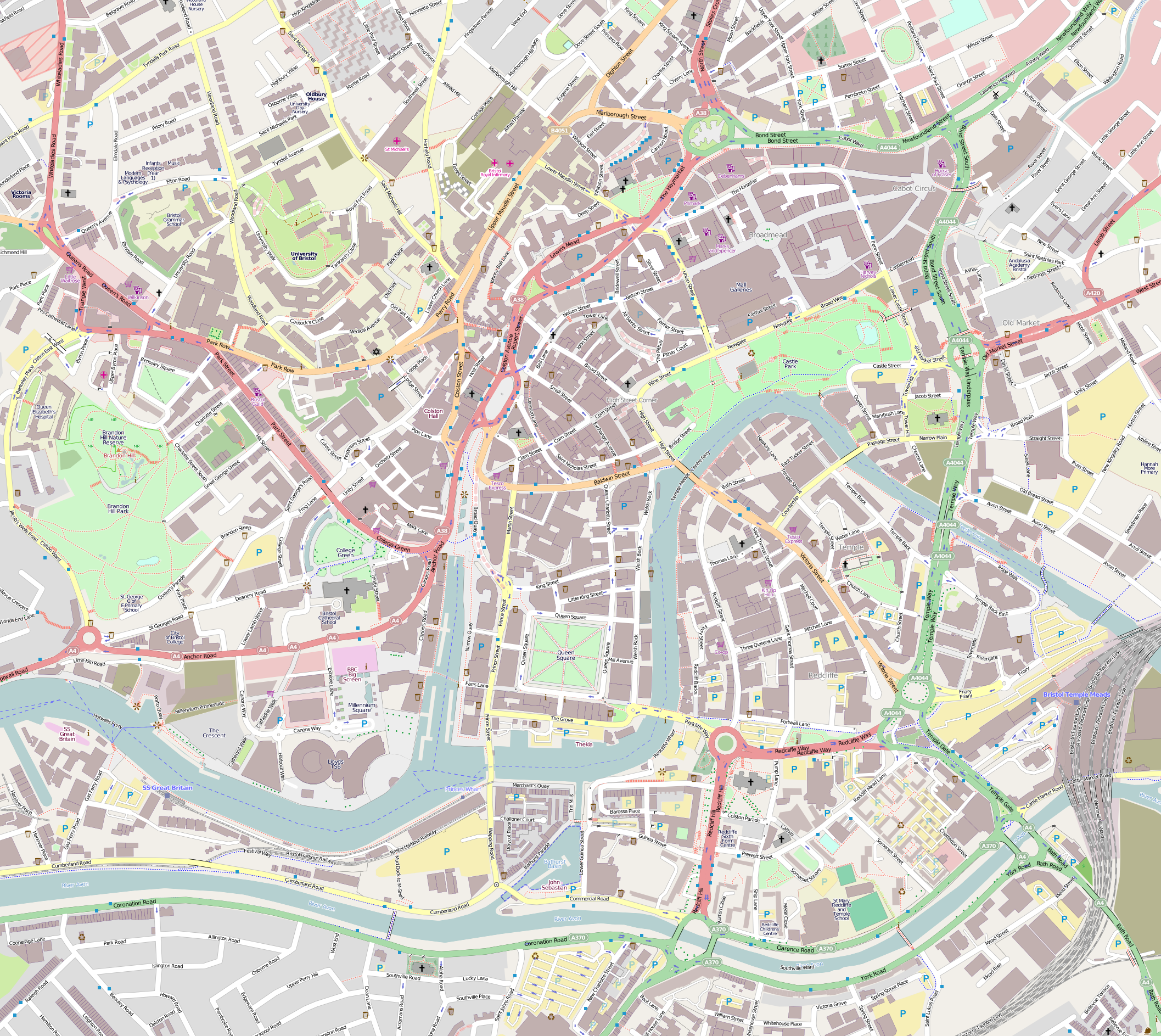
- Location within Bristol Central
- Maintained by: Bristol City Council
- Location: Bristol, England
- Postal code: BS1
- North: Union Street
- East: Newgate
- South: High Street
- West: Corn Street

Wine Street, together with High Street, Broad Street and Corn Street, is one of the four cross streets which met at the Bristol High Cross, the heart of Bristol, England when it was a walled mediaeval town. From this crossroads Wine Street runs along a level ridge approximately 175m north-eastwards to the top of Union Street.

Wine Street was for centuries an important shopping street but, following wartime destruction and the decision to move Bristol's main shopping area to Broadmead, it now contains little notable architecture and acts as barrier between the Old City and Castle Park. Bristol City Council are now seeking to repair this by redeveloping the area.

== History ==
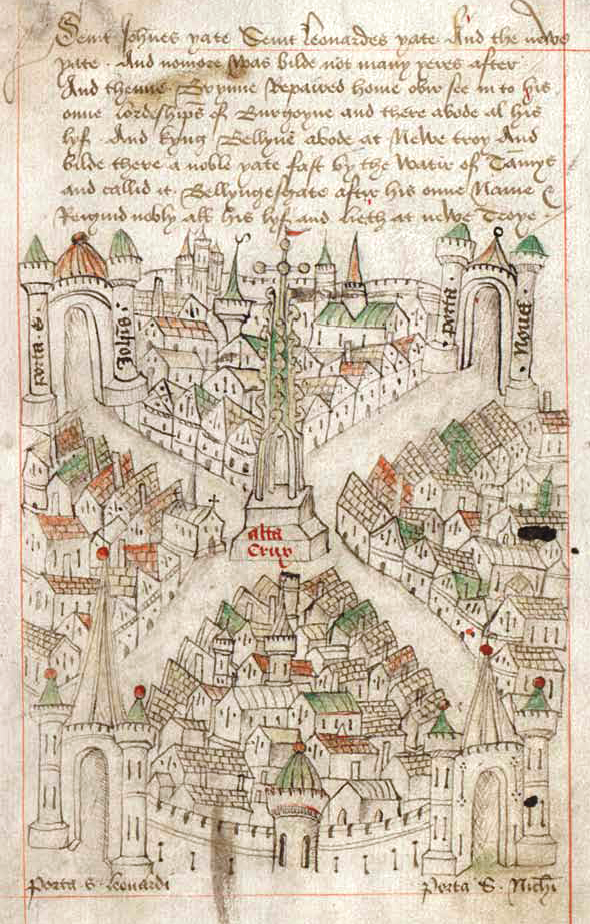
Robert Ricart's map of Bristol in 1479. Wine Street is shown running north-east from the High Cross (Alta Crux)

Wine Street, together with High Street, Corn Street and Broad Street, formed the earliest nucleus of Bristol. Ricart's Plan of 1479, one of the first English town plans, shows Wine Street with the High Cross at one end and Newgate at the other; the other three cross streets are also shown, each ending at their own gate in the city wall. The name Wine Street is thought to be a corruption of Winch Street, after a winch-operated pillory which stood at the eastern end of the street.

It was a commercial street from its earliest days: in 1286, Thomas de Westone and his wife Roysia took out a lease on two shops there for thirty years 'at a poetical rent of a rose at the feast of St John the Baptist yearly'. By the 14th century, the four cross streets and Bristol Bridge were a clearly defined shopping centre: Bristol Bridge, the prime site, was the location of jewellers and mercers; High Street was home to wool drapers; and linen drapers were to be found on Wine Street. Samuel Pepys, his wife and servants came to the Horse Shoe Inn on Wine Street for a day in 1668, and described Bristol as 'in every way another London', though he noted that there were 'no carts, it generally stands on vaults, only dog-carts'.

In the early 17th century an open-sided corn market was built in the middle of Wine Street. Shown on James Millerd's Map of 1671, this was 18 feet (5.5 m) wide by 80 feet (24 m) long. It left only a narrow passageway on either side for those who wished to go along the street, and was demolished in 1727. Eventually a Cheese Market was erected between its former location and Mary le Port Street.

Thomas Cadell, who went on to make a fortune in bookselling and publishing, was born on Wine Street in 1742; his father, also Thomas Cadell, was a bookseller. Robert Southey, Poet Laureate from 1813 to 1843, was born on Wine Street in 1774; his father, also named Robert Southey, was a linen draper. Southey is commemorated by post-war Southey House, though Southey's birthplace was actually at the other end of the street.

By the 1820s, it seems the drapers of Wine Street were becoming complacent: William Ablett came from London to manage a shop here and wrote that 'trade was conducted in a droning sort of way', and shocked the local traders by his new-fangled ideas about window-dressing several times a week with lavish displays of shawls and bolts of fabric. Thomas Jones, whose department store started in Wine Street in 1843, was considered outrageous for selling not just drapery, but anything that would make a profit. His business grew into High Street and Mary le Port Street, and incorporated the Guard House, where soldiers had once been billeted during the Civil War.

At the turn of the 20th century, Wine Street still formed part of Bristol's chief shopping centre and contained many of Bristol's most exclusive shops and department stores. In 1915 the globes and lanterns of its street lamps were painted blue to dim their light as an air raid precaution; in the event Bristol suffered no aerial attacks during the First World War. Things were very different 25 years later, however: almost all buildings on Wine Street were destroyed or damaged beyond repair by aerial bombing on 24 November 1940, including the landmark Dutch House which stood on the corner of Wine Street and High Street. An eyewitness described the scene:

...looking up Clare Street, I was appalled at the view of Wine Street. I could see All Saints Church intact, but beyond the site of the old High Cross all detail was lost in one vast sheet of orange flame.

Wine Street had for many centuries been an important shopping area, and a key part of Bristol's pre-war shopping axis which ran from Queens Road and Park Street, through St Nicholas Market, Wine Street and Castle Street and onwards to Old Market Street and Stapleton Road; nonetheless post-war planners decided to move Bristol's main shopping area to Broadmead, where the larger sites required by the bigger retailers could be accommodated. Wine Street was widened in 1956, and new buildings were erected on the north side of the street. Plans for the area to the south of Wine Street to become a new Civic Centre, including a city museum and art gallery, were eroded by the leasing of the Bank of England and the Norwich Union sites and then dropped on the grounds of cost. Finally, it was decided to create a 'really splendid' park. Hugh Casson, Neville Conder and Partners produced a plan for this, but in the end the Parks Department laid out their own 'emasculated' version of the park.

== Wine Street today ==
The north side of Wine Street now has just three buildings: The Prudential Building, now let out as office suites; across The Pithay, the Vintry Building which also offers rental office suites; and Southey House, now a block of 38 flats.

Andrew Foyle, in his Pevsner Architectural Guide to Bristol, describes Wine Street as 'perhaps the saddest post-Blitz transformation'. He is dismissive of the buildings on the north side, berating the Prudential Building's 'dull stripped classicism' and describing the Vintry Building and Southey House as 'singularly unimaginative'. He is scornful of the Bank of England building on the south side, 'merely occupying the land, with bleak fenestration and a puny entrance', its 'weak' extension 'weakly set back over a parking access ramp'.

Bristol City Council is seeking redevelopment of the area south of Wine Street and around Mary le Port Street, to help connect the markets area with the shopping quarter at Broadmead. This would include reducing the width of Wine Street to more closely resemble its historic proportions. The redevelopment of this area 'offer[s] perhaps the greatest potential of any site in the city to demonstrate the ambition of Bristol and to realise a connected and coherent historic core'.

Wine Street is within the Old City and Queen Square Conservation Area.

== Listed buildings ==
There are no listed buildings on Wine Street. There is, however, one unlisted building of merit:

Number	Grade	Year listed	Description
	Unlisted building of merit	n/a	Prudential Buildings

== Gallery ==
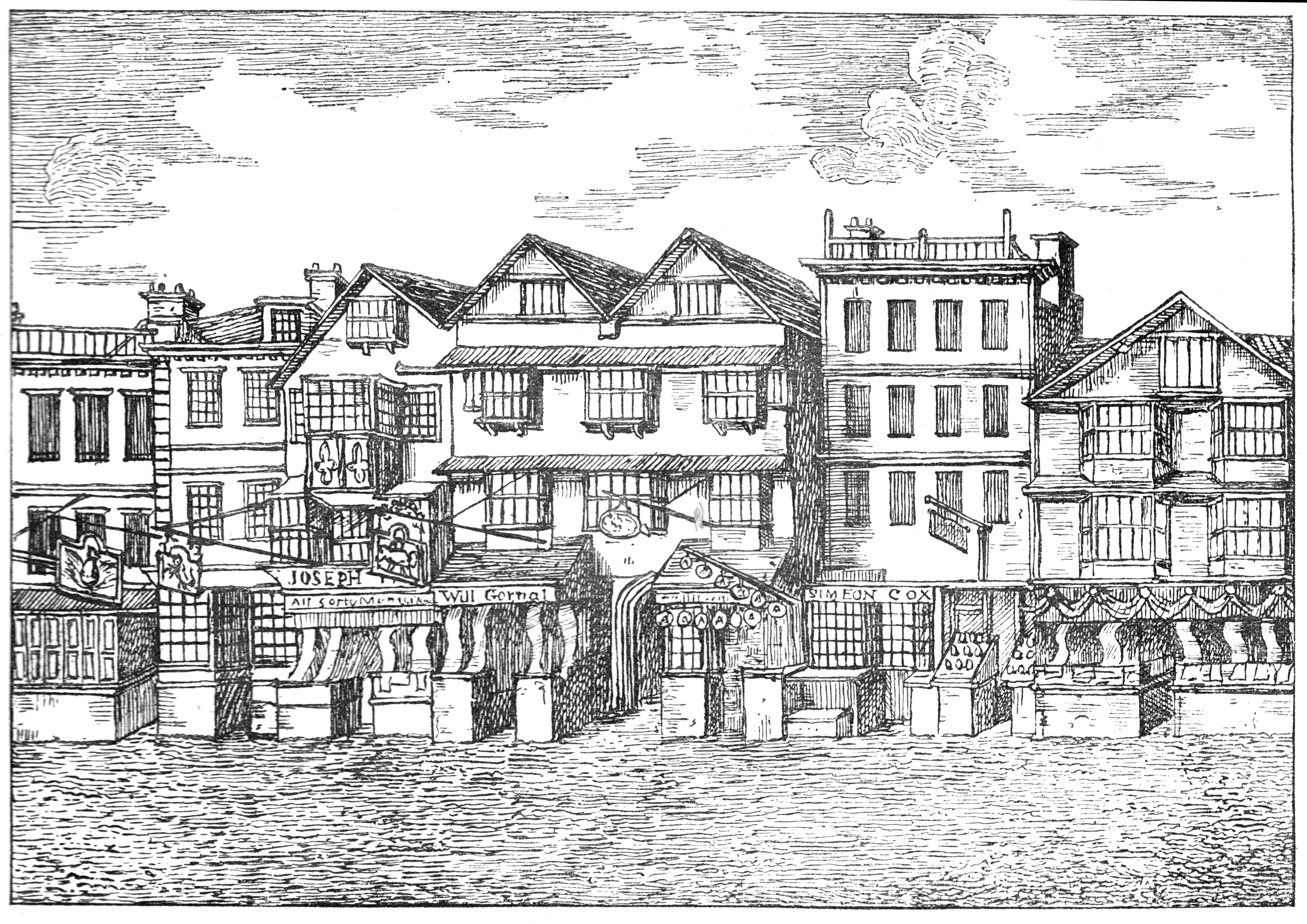
South side of Wine Street with the entrance to the Guard-house, 17th century

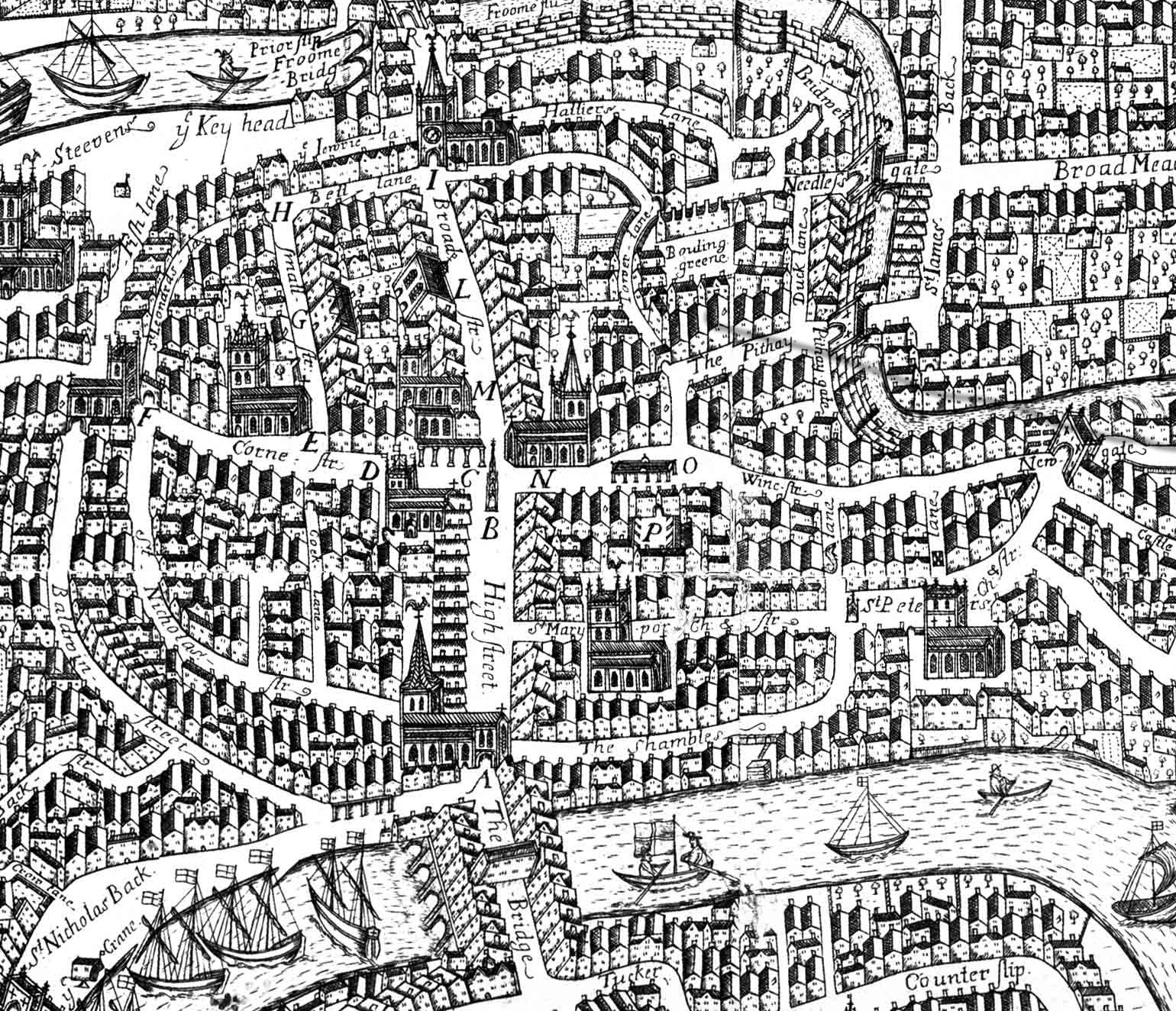
Millerd's Map of 1671, showing Corn Market (marked 'O') in middle of Wine Street

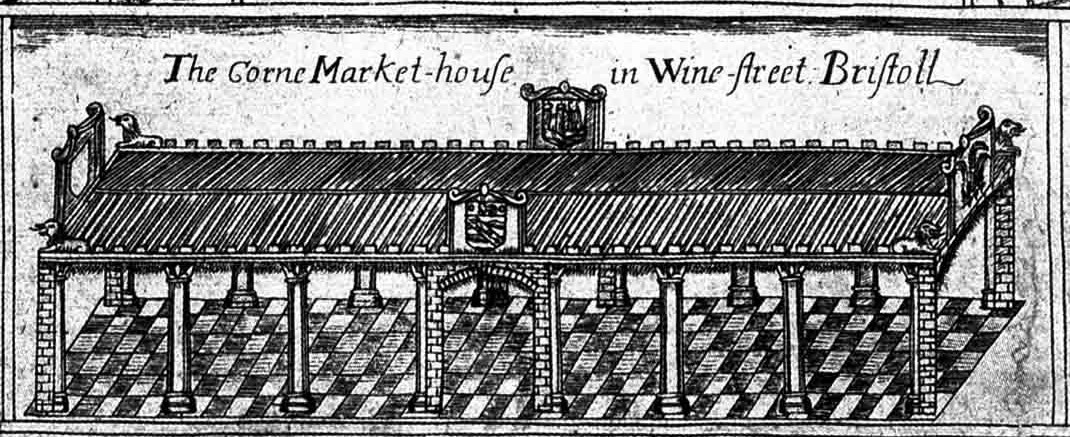
Corn Market, Wine Street

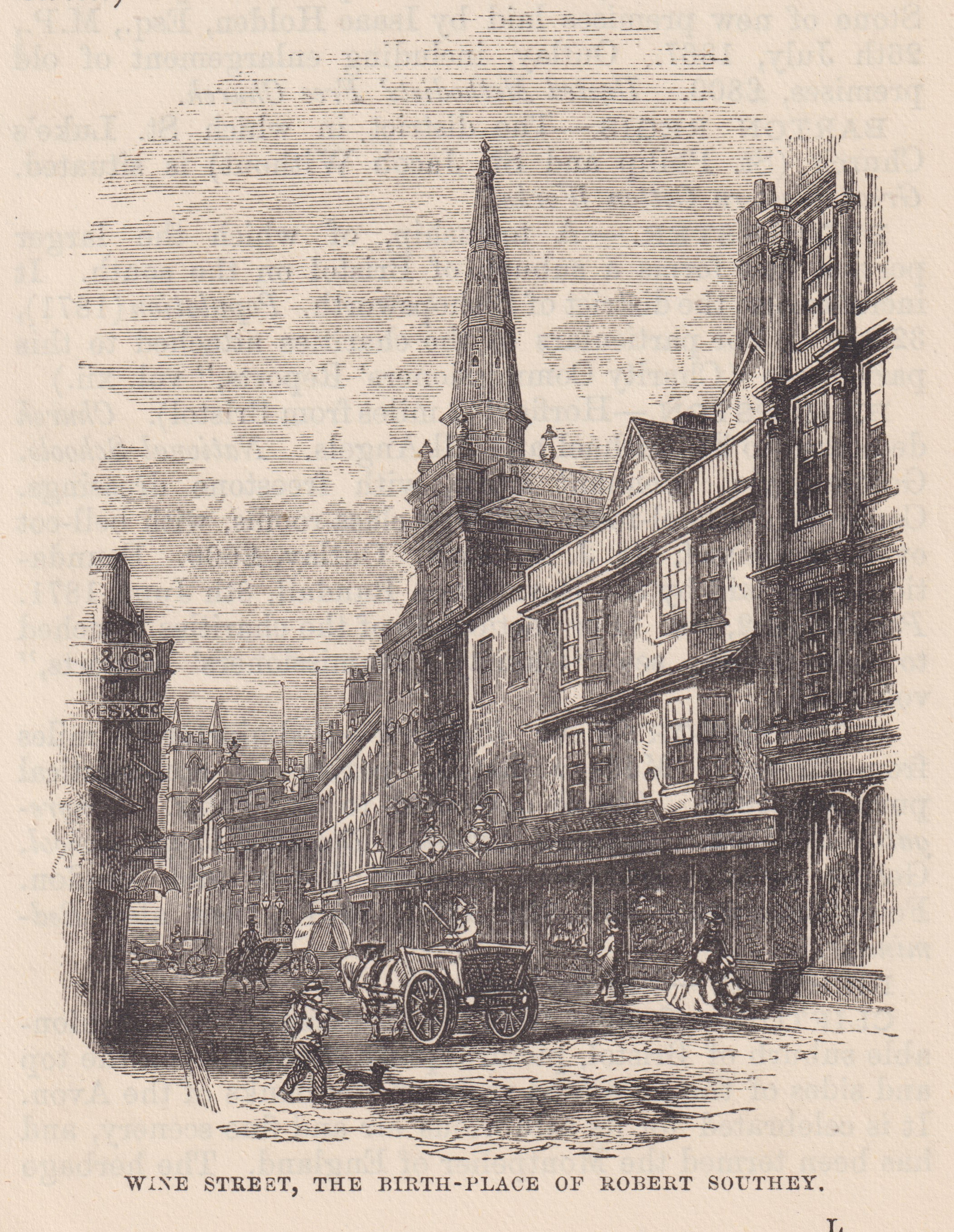
Wine Street, Bristol (1872)

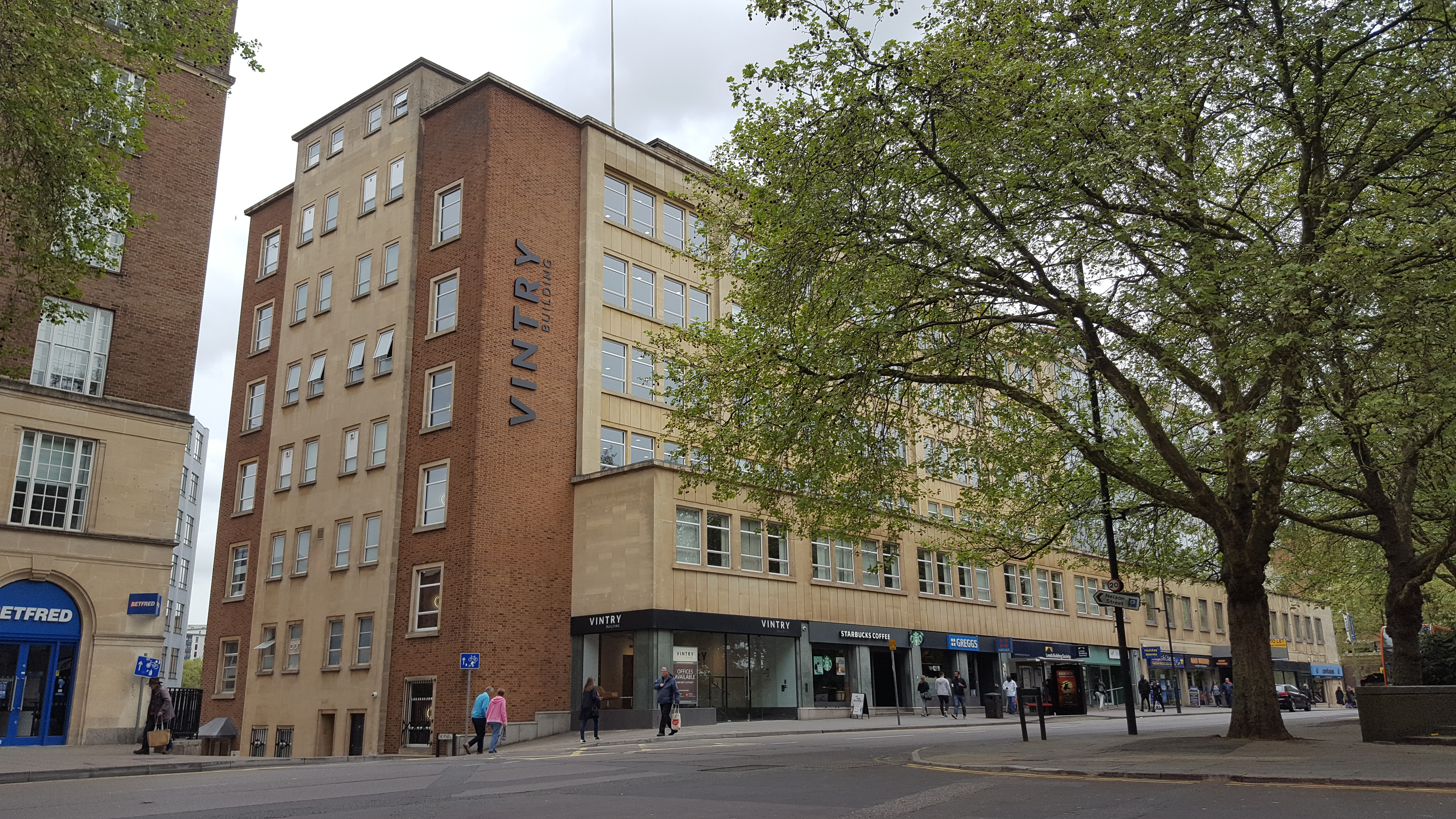
Vintry Building

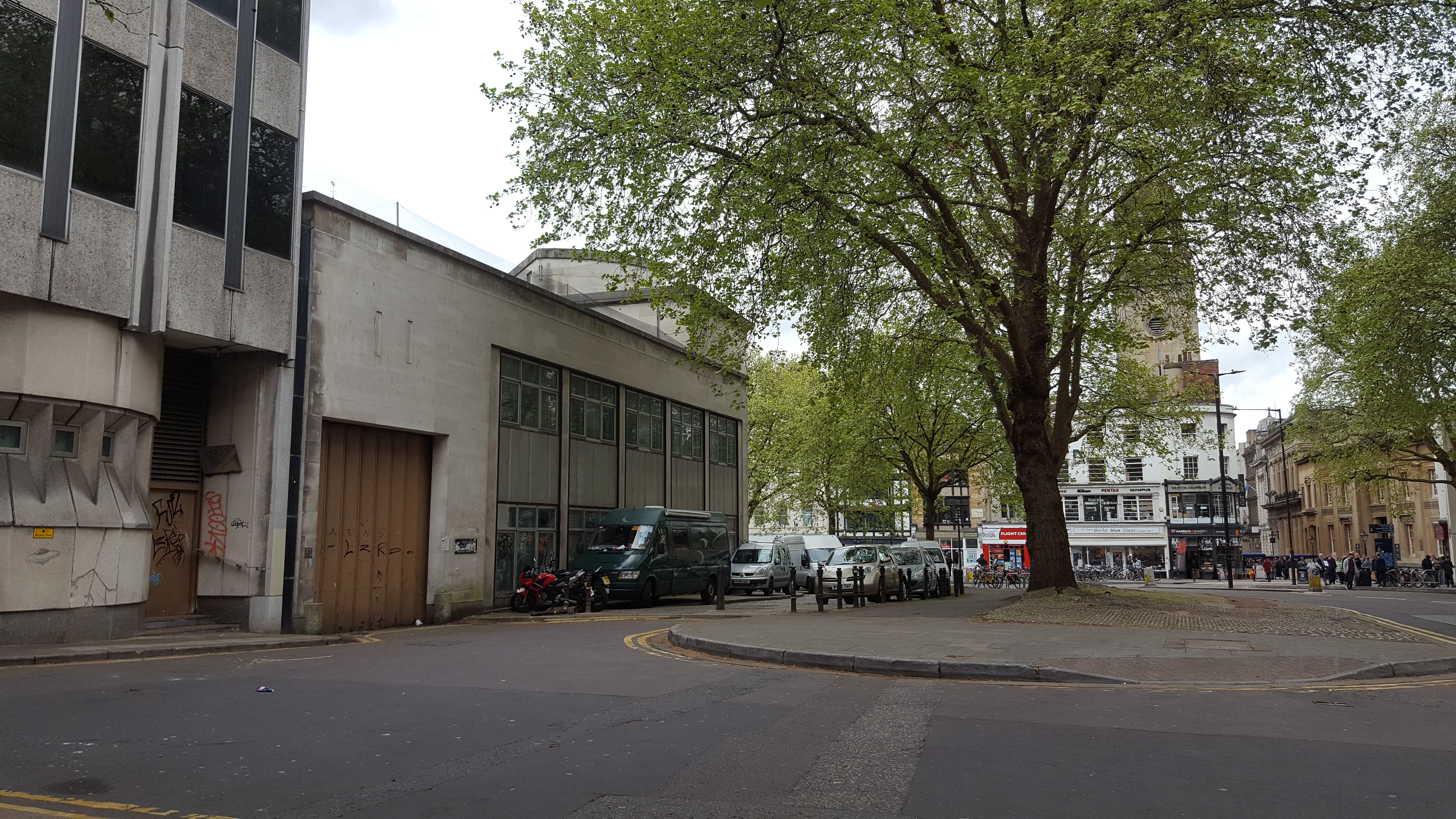
Bank of England building, with mediaeval crossroads beyond

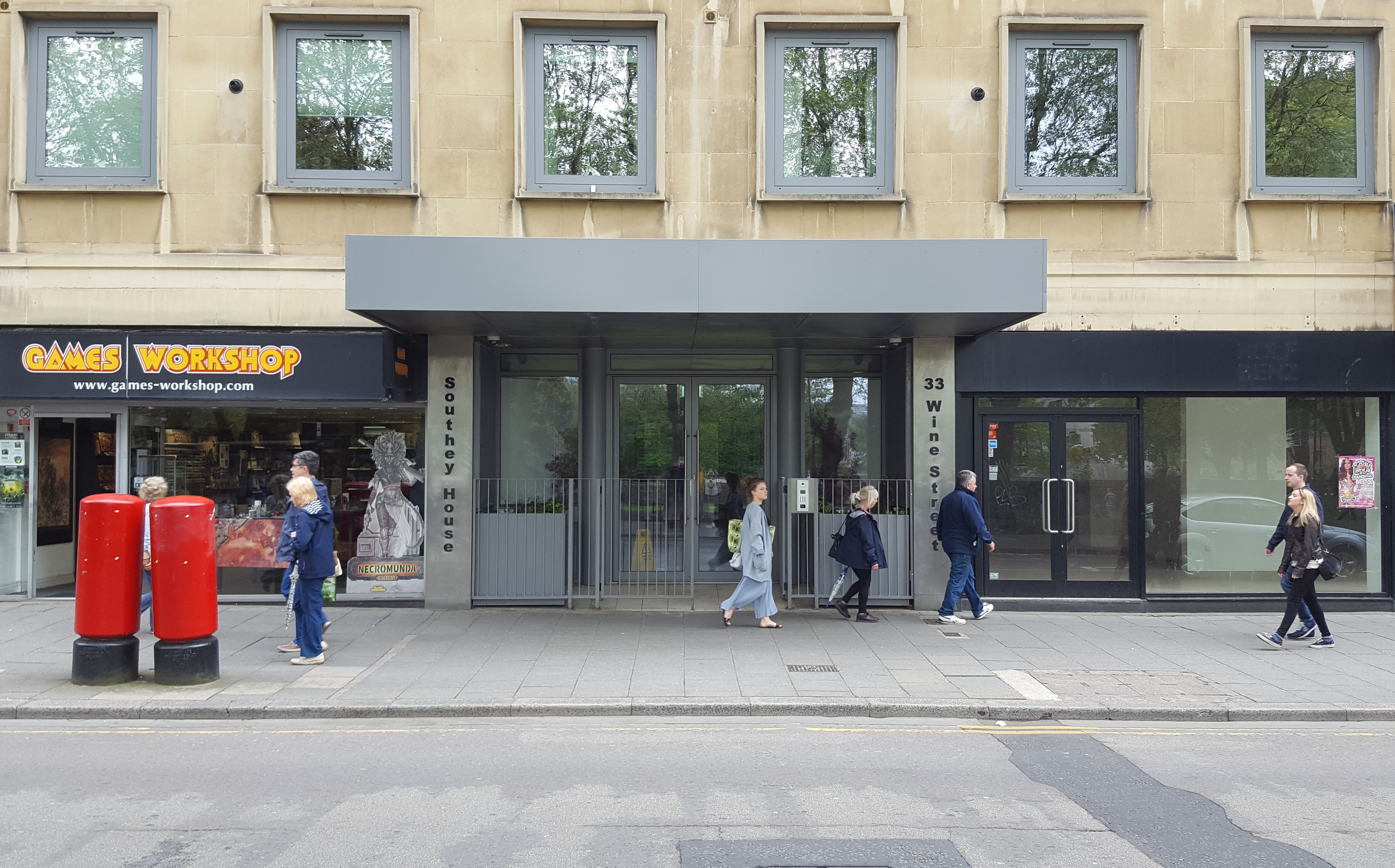
Entrance to Southey House
