= Broad Street, Bristol =

Street in Bristol, England

Coordinates: 51°27′23″N 2°35′48″W

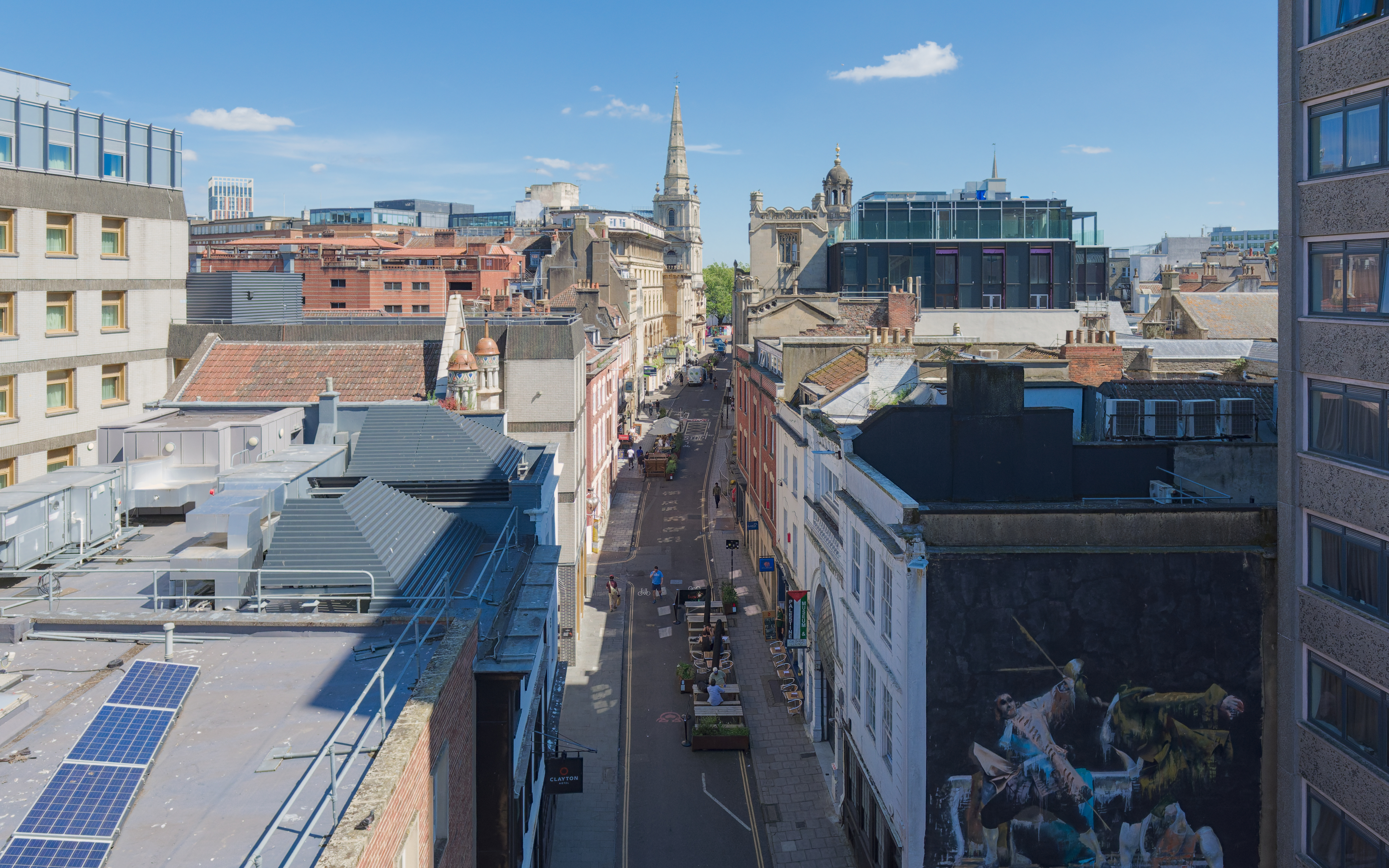
- Broad Street, Bristol, from the church tower of St John the Baptist

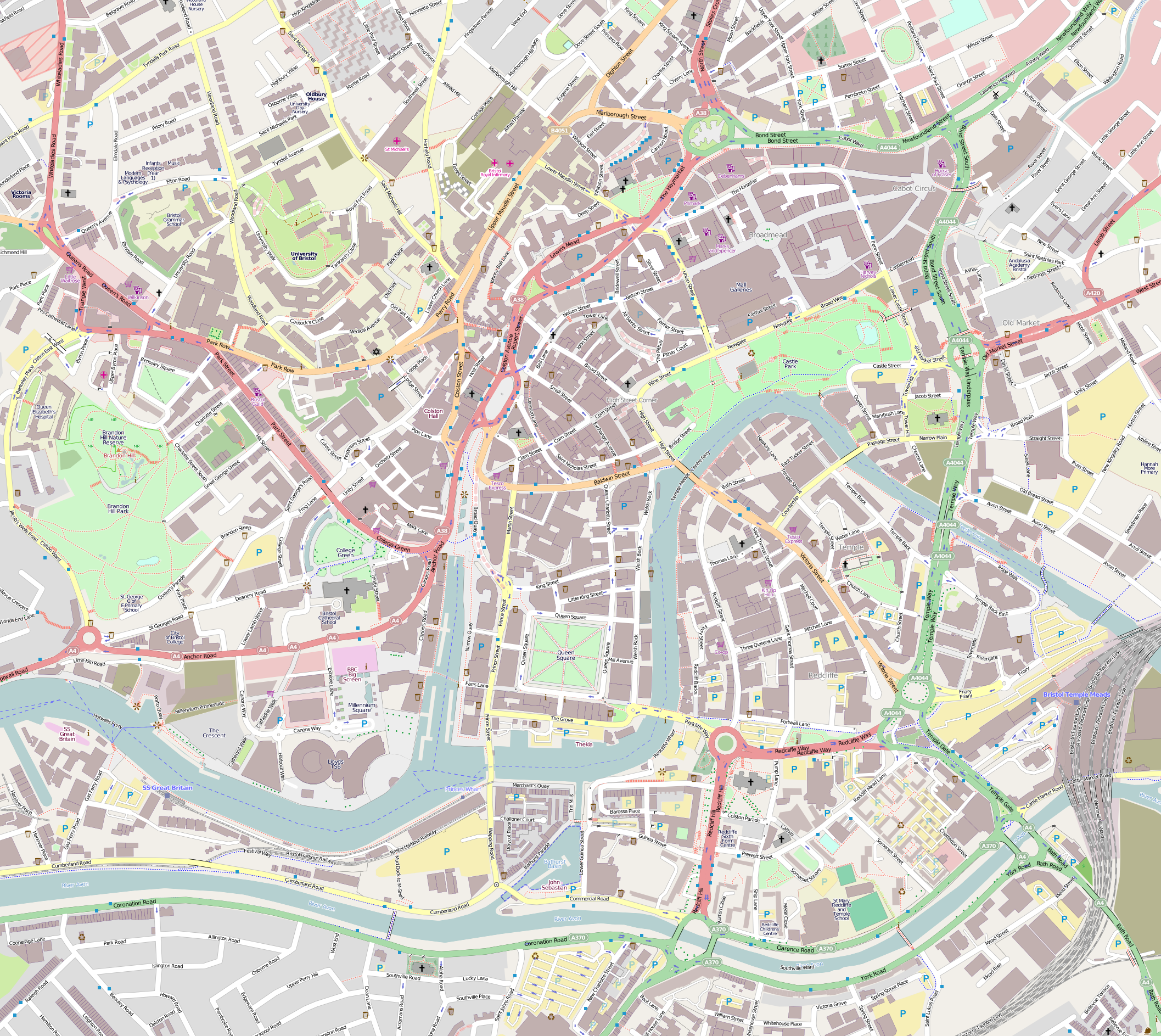
- Location within Bristol Central
- Maintained by: Bristol City Council
- Location: Bristol, England
- Postal code: BS1
- North: Quay Street
- East: Wine Street
- South: High Street
- West: Corn Street

Broad Street, along with High Street, Wine Street and Corn Street, is one of the four original streets that have made up the city of Bristol since Saxon times, when it was the burgh of Brycgstow.

Prior to the building of The Exchange merchants would set up their stalls on Broad Street. An old city gate stands at the bottom of the street, where it joins Quay Street.

== Notable architecture ==
Going downhill from the junction with Corn Street, other notable buildings include Christ Church with St Ewen, designed and built by William Paty in the late 18th century, a former branch of the Bank of England designed by Charles R Cockerell in Greek Doric style, the Thistle Hotel, Bristol by Foster and Wood in Italian Renaissance, the Guildhall in Gothic style by Richard Shackleton Pope and the Art Nouveau Edward Everard printing works.

The printing works features a mural designed by W J Neatby depicting Gutenberg and William Morris, the founders of modern printing; a woman holding objects to represent Light and Truth and the spirit of Literature. It is made from Carrara- Ware marble tiles.

Tailor's Court is a small side lane leading off Broad Street. Here can be seen the Merchant Tailor's Guild Hall, built in 1740. This area used to be full of lawyers' offices, but is now mostly student accommodation. The churchyard of St John the Baptist has an entrance here. On the opposite side of the street to the church entrance, the skyline is punctuated by St Lawrence House, a 12-storey tower completed in 1967 on the line of the medieval city wall. It has since been converted to student use.

== St John's Gate ==
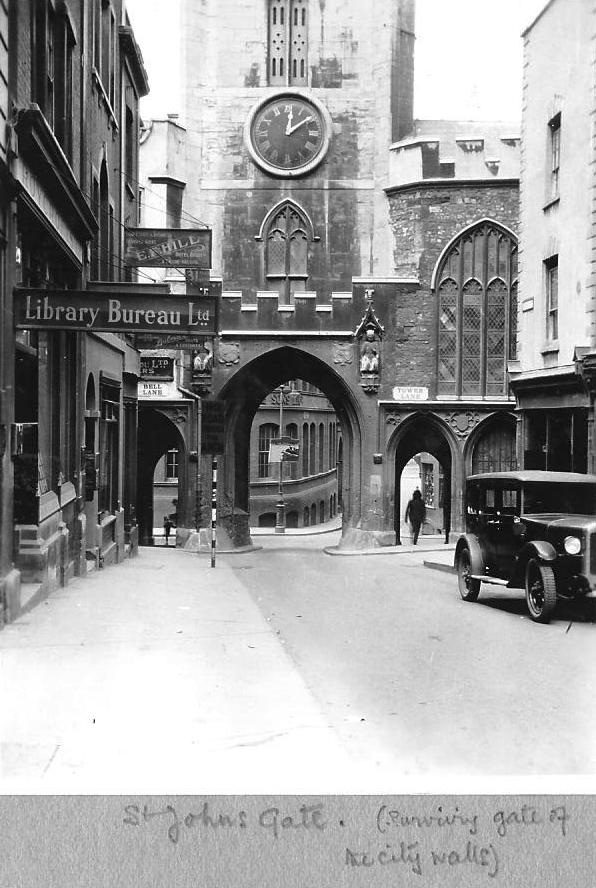
St John's Gate in 1931

St John's Gate, which stands at the bottom of the street, is the last remaining part of the city wall, with Church of St John the Baptist built above it. The two side passages were created in the 1820s. Niches in the wall contain the figures Brennus and Belinus, according to legend they founded the city. Nearby St John's Conduit was originally built for the friary of the Carmelites but also supplied the people of Brandon Hill. The parishioners were allowed to use only the overflow from the system, and they took advantage of this again during the blitz of World War II when water mains had been damaged.
