= Grade I listed buildings in Bristol =

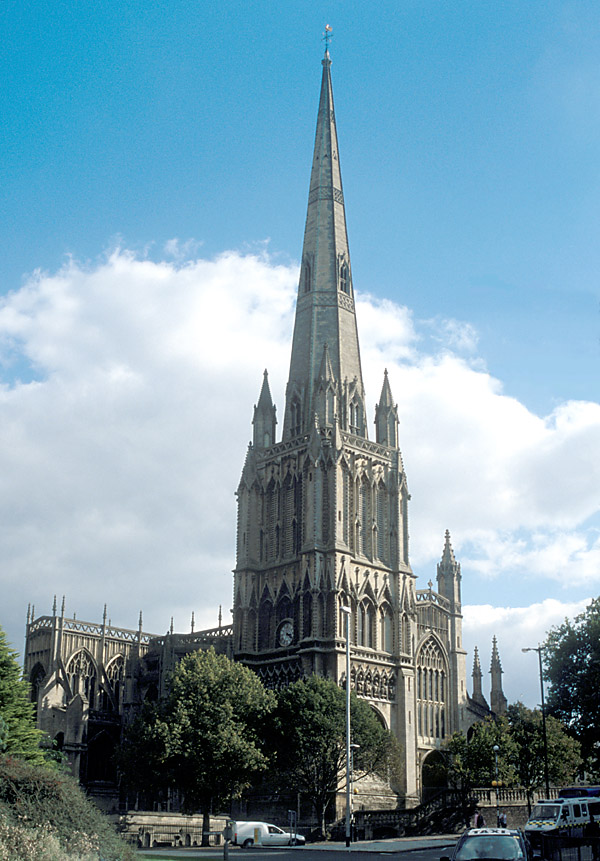
St Mary Redcliffe was the tallest building in Bristol for centuries. The church was described by Queen Elizabeth I as "the fairest, goodliest, and most famous parish church in England.",

There are 100 Grade I listed buildings in Bristol, England according to Bristol City Council. The register includes many structures which for convenience are grouped together in the list below.

In the United Kingdom, the term listed building refers to a building or other structure officially designated as being of special architectural, historical or cultural significance; Grade I structures are those considered to be "buildings of exceptional interest". Listing was begun by a provision in the Town and Country Planning Act 1947. Listing a building imposes severe restrictions on what the owner might wish to change or modify in the structure or its fittings. In England, the authority for listing under the Planning (Listed Buildings and Conservation Areas) Act 1990 rests with Historic England, a non-departmental public body sponsored by the Department for Culture, Media and Sport, while local authorities have a responsibility to regulate and enforce the planning regulations.

The oldest Grade I listed buildings in Bristol are religious. St James' Priory was founded in 1129 as a Benedictine priory by Robert, Earl of Gloucester, the illegitimate son of Henry I. The building is on the Historic England Buildings at Risk Register and described as being in very bad condition. The second oldest is The Cathedral Church of the Holy and Undivided Trinity which is more commonly known as Bristol Cathedral and its associated Gatehouse. Founded in 1140, the church became the seat of the bishop and cathedral of the new Diocese of Bristol in 1542. Most of the medieval stonework, particularly the Elder Lady Chapel, is made from limestone taken from quarries around Dundry and Felton with Bath stone being used in other areas. Amongst the other churches included in the list is the 12th century St Mary Redcliffe which was the tallest building in Bristol until 2020. The church was described by Queen Elizabeth I as "the fairest, goodliest, and most famous parish church in England." The New Room was built in 1739 by John Wesley and is the oldest Methodist chapel in the world.

Secular buildings include The Red Lodge which was built in 1580 for John Yonge as a lodge for a Great House, which once stood on the site of the present Bristol Beacon. It was subsequently added to in Georgian times and restored in the early 20th century. It has had several uses in its past, including hosting the country's first girls' reform school in 1854. It is open to the public as a branch of Bristol City Museum and Art Gallery. Other manor houses include the 18th century Kings Weston House and Goldney Hall where the highly decorated Grotto dates from 1739. Commercial buildings such as paired Exchange and Old Post Office from the 1740s are also included in the list. Residential buildings in the Georgian Portland Square and the complex of small cottages around a green at Blaise Hamlet. Blaise Hamlet was built around 1811 for retired employees of Quaker banker and philanthropist John Scandrett Harford, who owned Blaise Castle House. The 18th century industrial structures of Isambard Kingdom Brunel are represented in the list by the Clifton Suspension Bridge, Avon Bridge and the Bristol Old Station which formed the original Bristol Temple Meads railway station.

== Buildings ==
Name	Location	Type	Architect	Completed (Note: The date given is the date used by Historic England as significant for the initial building or that of an important part in the structure's description.)	Date designated	Grid ref. (Note: The grid reference is based on the British national grid reference system, sometimes known as OSGB36, used by the Ordnance Survey.) Geo-coordinates	Entry number (Note: The "List Entry Number" is a unique number assigned to each listed building and scheduled monument by Historic England.)	Image	Ref.
Avon Bridge	Whitby Rd, Brislington	Bridge	Isambard Kingdom Brunel	1839	8 June 1990	ST6132172442; 51°26′59″N 2°33′29″W	1219892	Avon Bridge More images	
Black Castle Public House	Junction Rd, Brislington (Note: The Black Castle Public House is also known as Arno's Castle.)	Mock castle	William Halfpenny or James Bridges	1745–55	8 January 1959	ST6111471753; 51°26′36″N 2°33′39″W	1292881	Black Castle Public House More images	
Oak Cottage	1, Hallen Rd, Blaise Hamlet	Workers cottage		1811	8 January 1959	ST5601778878; 51°30′26″N 2°38′06″W	1207747	Oak Cottage More images	
Diamond Cottage	2, Hallen Rd, Blaise Hamlet	Workers cottage		1811	8 January 1959	ST5599278874; 51°30′25″N 2°38′08″W	1282285	Diamond Cottage More images	
Dutch Cottage	3, Hallen Rd, Blaise Hamlet	Workers cottage		1811	8 January 1959	ST5597978856; 51°30′25″N 2°38′08″W	1207760	Dutch Cottage More images	
Double Cottage	4 & 5, Hallen Rd, Blaise Hamlet	Workers cottage		1811	8 January 1959	ST5594778867; 51°30′25″N 2°38′10″W	1202260	Double Cottage More images	
Rose Cottage	6, Hallen Rd, Blaise Hamlet	Workers cottage		1811	8 January 1959	ST5594478882; 51°30′26″N 2°38′10″W	1202261	Rose Cottage More images	
Dial Cottage	7, Hallen Rd, Blaise Hamlet	Workers cottage		1811	8 January 1959	ST5596778903; 51°30′26″N 2°38′09″W	1282246	Dial Cottage More images	
Circular Cottage	8, Hallen Rd, Blaise Hamlet	Workers cottage		1811	8 January 1959	ST5598278913; 51°30′27″N 2°38′08″W	1202262	Circular Cottage More images	
Sweetbriar Cottage	9, Hallen Rd, Blaise Hamlet	Workers cottage		1811	8 January 1959	ST5599078921; 51°30′27″N 2°38′08″W	1282247	Sweetbriar Cottage More images	
Vine Cottage	10, Hallen Rd, Blaise Hamlet	Workers cottage		1811	8 January 1959	ST5601878917; 51°30′27″N 2°38′06″W	1202263	Vine Cottage More images	
Sundial to the middle of the green at Blaise Hamlet	Hallen Rd, Blaise Hamlet	Sundial		1811	8 January 1959	ST5598078894; 51°30′26″N 2°38′08″W	1202264	Sundial to the middle of the green at Blaise Hamlet More images	
Bristol Cathedral	College Green (Note: Bristol Cathedral is also known as the Cathedral Church of St Augustine.)	Cathedral		1140	8 January 1959	ST5835972683; 51°27′06″N 2°36′02″W	1202129	Bristol Cathedral More images	
Bristol Central Library	College Green	Library	Charles Holden	1906	1 November 1966	ST5825272674; 51°27′05″N 2°36′08″W	1202131	Bristol Central Library More images	
Theatre Royal and Cooper's Hall	King Street (Note: The entry includes the Theatre Royal and Coopers Hall, currently the home of the Bristol Old Vic Theatre Company.)	Theatre	William Halfpenny	1764–66	8 January 1959	ST5880372748; 51°27′08″N 2°35′39″W	1209703	Theatre Royal and Cooper's Hall More images	
Bristol Temple Meads railway station	Temple Meads	Railway station	Matthew Digby Wyatt	1871–78		ST5974972461; 51°26′59″N 2°34′50″W	1282106	Bristol Temple Meads railway station More images	
Bristol Old Station, Temple Meads	Temple Meads	Railway station	Isambard Kingdom Brunel	1840	1 November 1966	ST5959272419; 51°26′57″N 2°34′58″W	1209622	Bristol Old Station, Temple Meads More images	
St John the Baptist	Broad Street (Note: The Church of St John the Baptist is also known as St John's on the Wall.)	Church		14th century	8 January 1959	ST5875473166; 51°27′21″N 2°35′42″W	1202022	St John the Baptist More images	
Clifton Suspension Bridge	Clifton Down	Bridge	Isambard Kingdom Brunel	1829–1864	8 January 1959	ST5647873077; 51°27′18″N 2°37′40″W	1205734	Clifton Suspension Bridge More images	
Clifton Hill House	Clifton	House	Isaac Ware	1746–1750	8 January 1959	ST5751172924; 51°27′13″N 2°36′46″W	1280480	Clifton Hill House More images	
Colstons Almshouses	St Michaels Hill (Note: The entry for Colstons Almshouses includes the front wall and gates.)	Almshouse		1691	8 January 1959	ST5850973363; 51°27′28″N 2°35′55″W	1202546	Colstons Almshouses More images	
Equestrian statue of William III	Queen Square	Statue	John Michael Rysbrack	1736	13 October 1952	ST5877472561; 51°27′02″N 2°35′41″W	1218127	Equestrian statue of William III More images	
The Exchange	Corn Street (Note: The Exchange is also known as the Corn Exchange. The entry also includes the railings and Nails.)	Corn exchange	John Wood the Elder	1741–43	24 March 1950	ST5885972992; 51°27′16″N 2°35′37″W	1298770	The Exchange More images	
Former Bank of England	13/14 Broad Street	Bank	Charles Robert Cockerell	1844–47	8 January 1959	ST5882473086; 51°27′19″N 2°35′38″W	1282404	Former Bank of England More images	
The Great Gatehouse	College Green	Gatehouse		1140	4 March 1977	ST5827872686; 51°27′06″N 2°36′07″W	1202132	The Great Gatehouse More images	
Grotto at Goldney House	Clifton	Grotto		1737–64		ST5744172736; 51°27′07″N 2°36′50″W	1202104	Grotto at Goldney House More images	
Holy Trinity Church	Church Rd, Westbury on Trym	Church		1194	8 January 1959	ST5733177405; 51°29′38″N 2°36′58″W	1202080	Holy Trinity Church More images	
Kings Weston House	Kings Weston Lane, Shirehampton (Note: The entry for Kings Weston House includes the Loggia, Brewhouse and Echo.)	House	John Vanbrugh	1710–25	8 January 1959	ST5417377481; 51°29′40″N 2°39′41″W	1209729	Kings Weston House More images	
New Room	Broadmead	Chapel		1739	8 January 1959	ST5909173386; 51°27′29″N 2°35′25″W	1202025	New Room More images	
Old Post Office	48 Corn Street	Post office	Samuel Glascodine	1746	8 January 1959	ST5883072990; 51°27′16″N 2°35′38″W	1187390	Old Post Office More images	
No 1–6 Portland Square	St Pauls	House	Daniel Hague	18th century	8 January 1959	ST5938573663; 51°27′38″N 2°35′10″W	1202443	No 1–6 Portland Square More images	
No 7–13 Portland Square	St Pauls	House	Daniel Hague	18th century	8 January 1959	ST5943773662; 51°27′38″N 2°35′07″W	1208806	No 7–13 Portland Square More images	
No 14–17 Portland Square	St Pauls	House	Daniel Hague	18th century	8 January 1959	ST5948073705; 51°27′39″N 2°35′05″W	1282179	No 14–17 Portland Square More images	
No 18–21 Portland Square	St Pauls	House	Daniel Hague	18th century	8 January 1959	ST5944773775; 51°27′41″N 2°35′06″W	1208823	Upload Photo	
No 22–28 Portland Square	St Pauls	House	Daniel Hague	18th century	8 January 1959	ST5938673772; 51°27′41″N 2°35′10″W	1202444	No 22–28 Portland Square More images	
No 31–34 Portland Square	St Pauls	House	Daniel Hague	18th century	8 January 1959	ST5936173716; 51°27′39″N 2°35′11″W	1208879	No 31–34 Portland Square More images	
Quakers Friars	Broadmead	Priory, Friends Meeting House		1747–9	8 January 1959	ST592733	1202463	Quakers Friars More images	
Red Lodge Museum	Park Row	Lodge	possibly Sebastiano Serlio	c1589	8 January 1959	ST5843973112; 51°27′20″N 2°35′58″W	1202417	Red Lodge Museum More images	
Redland Chapel	Redland	Chapel	John Strahan or William Halfpenny	1740–43	8 January 1959	ST5798374983; 51°28′20″N 2°36′23″W	1218876	Redland Chapel More images	
Royal Fort	Tyndall Avenue, Tyndall's Park	House	James Bridges	1758–61	8 January 1959	ST5828373372; 51°27′28″N 2°36′07″W	1218262	Royal Fort More images	
St James' Priory	Horsefair, Whitson Street	Priory		1129	8 January 1959	ST5889473468; 51°27′31″N 2°35′35″W	1282067	St James' Priory More images	
St Mark's Church	College Green (Note: St Mark's Church is also known as the Lord Mayor's Chapel.)	Church		1230	8 January 1959	ST5839272838; 51°27′11″N 2°36′01″W	1355174	St Mark's Church More images	
St Mary Redcliffe	Redcliffe Way	Church		12th century	8 January 1959	ST5912872313; 51°26′54″N 2°35′22″W	1218848	St Mary Redcliffe More images	
St Stephen's Church	St Stephens Avenue	Church		14th century	8 January 1959	ST5868472983; 51°27′16″N 2°35′46″W	1202558	St Stephen's Church More images	
Westbury College Gatehouse	Westbury on Trym	Gatehouse		1459–1469 (rebuilt 1709)	8 January 1959	ST6335876158; 51°28′59″N 2°31′45″W	1187175	Westbury College Gatehouse More images	

== See also ==
- Buildings and architecture of Bristol
- Grade II* listed buildings in Bristol
- Grade II listed buildings in Bristol
- Category:Grade I listed buildings in Bristol
