= Holy Trinity Church, Westbury on Trym =

Church in Bristol, England

Holy Trinity Church
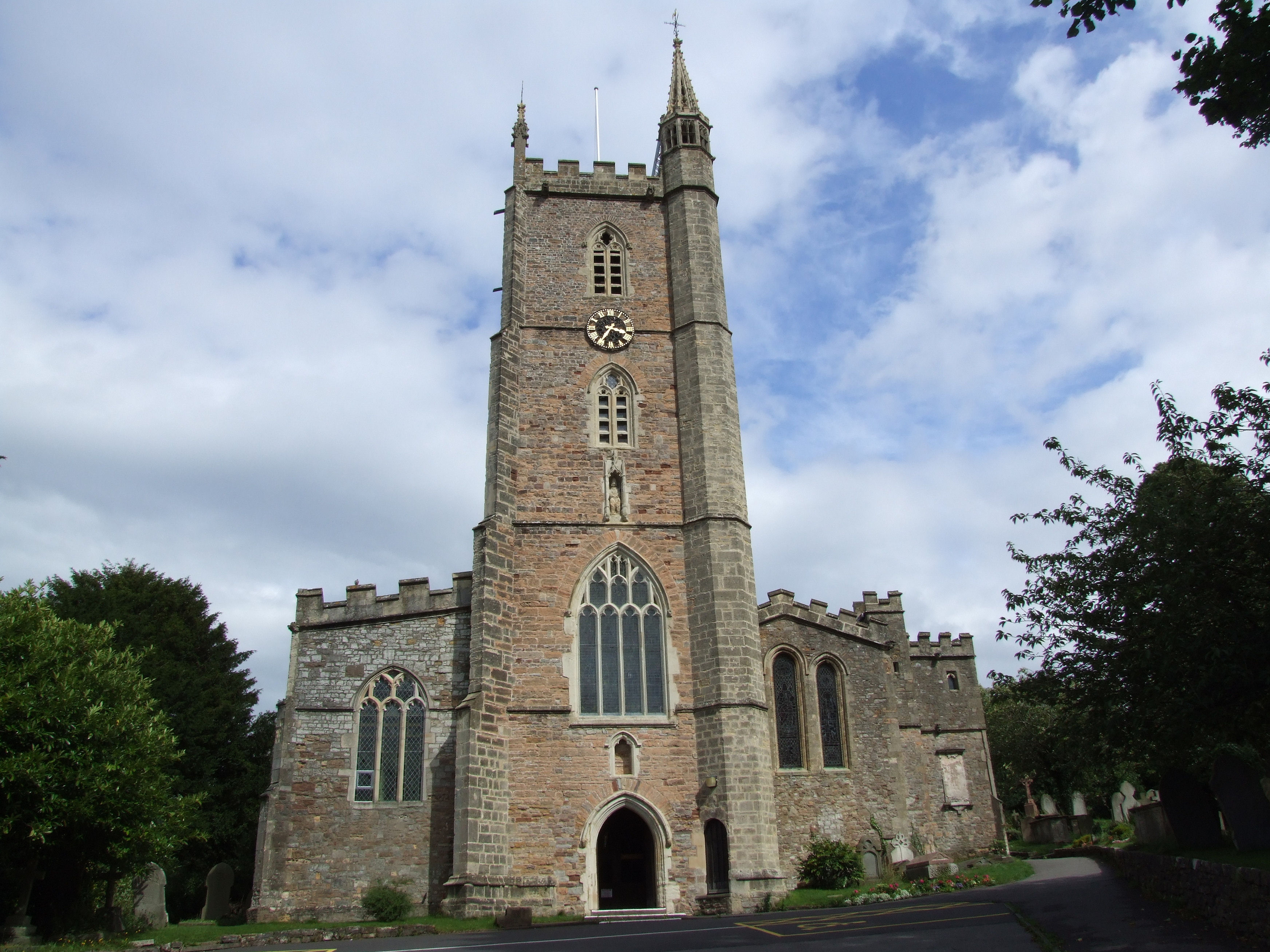
- The church tower.

- Location within Bristol

Religion
- Affiliation: Church of England
- District: Westbury-on-Trym
- Ecclesiastical or organizational status: Parish church

Location
- Location: Bristol, England
- Interactive map of Holy Trinity Church
- Coordinates: 51.493968°N 2.6160096°W

Architecture
- Style: English Gothic
- Completed: 15th century

Website
- Holy Trinity

Holy Trinity Church (grid reference ST5733177405) is a Church of England parish church in Westbury-on-Trym, Bristol, England.

The first church on the site was established in the 8th century. In the 10th century a Benedictine priory was founded. Construction of the present building began in the early 13th century and it has been rebuilt several times since. It has been designated by Historic England as a Grade I listed building.

From the late 12th century to the middle of the 16th century it was the collegiate church for Westbury College; of the latter, little more than the college gatehouse remains. The church contains the tomb of John Carpenter, Bishop of Worcester, who had planned to make it a joint cathedral for the Worcester diocese.

== History ==
=== Early years ===
The date the first church was founded has traditionally been put at 716–17; the historical record does show two foundations at this date, but these were actually at Yate and Bredon. Nevertheless, a church did exist by the end of the 8th century, as King Offa founded a minster on the site between 793 and 796.

The minster became a Benedictine priory around 963–64. It was the first reformation of a minster by Bishop Oswald of Worcester, in his introduction of the Rule of Saint Benedict into the diocese. He brought the English monk Germanus from Fleury Abbey as the new Prior. However Oswald soon decided to move the community to Ramsey, after he acquired land in 966 for the foundation of Ramsey Abbey. The priory buildings eventually fell into disrepair. Around 1093 Bishop Wulfstan reacquired the dilapidated priory and rebuilt it as a monastery under the control of the Worcester diocese.

=== Collegiate church ===
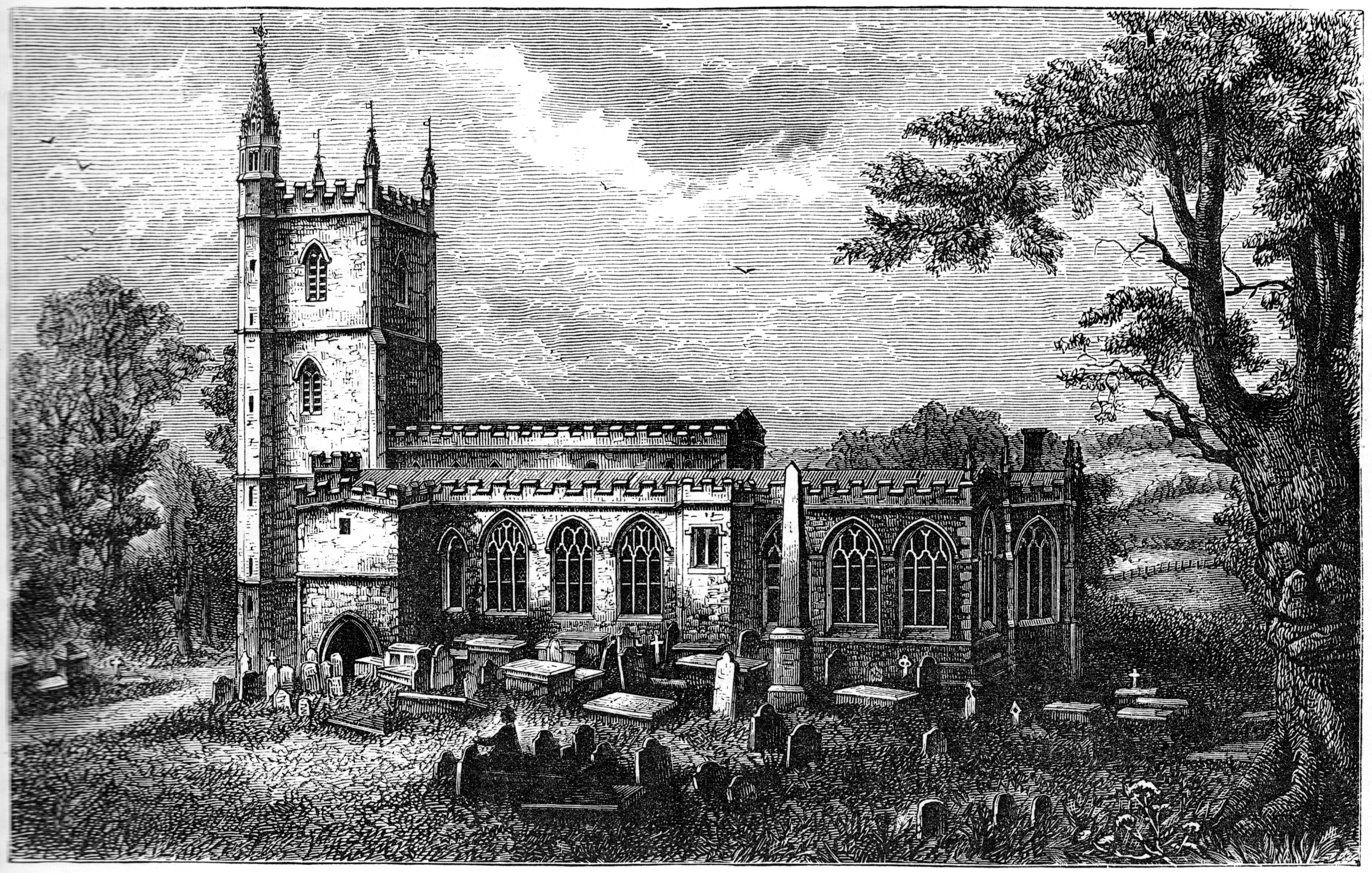
Holy Trinity Church in 1882

Over the next century, there were successive evictions as monks and secular priests alternated in possession of the monastery; this was finally resolved in favour of the secular priests when the church become collegiate around 1194. The canons of Westbury College were each supported by revenues from one of the areas around Westbury on Trym, including Aust, Henbury and Lawrence Weston.

The great reformist John Wycliffe was a canon from 1362 until his death in 1384, although in 1367 he was accused of neglecting his duties as prebendary of Aust due to his long absence. The prominent Bristol merchant William Canynge was dean of the college from 1469 until his death in 1474.

In 1544, with the Dissolution of the Monasteries, the church became a parish church within the new Bristol diocese, and the residential buildings of Westbury College passed into the hands of Sir Ralph Sadler.

== Architecture ==
The present building all dates to after 1194. The nave and aisles are early 13th century, in the Early English style. The remainder of the church is in the Perpendicular style.

The nave clerestory, chancel, choir and north chapel are the result of extensive rebuilding by Bishop Carpenter in the middle of the 15th century. The chancel has a polygonal apse, which is rare for the late Gothic period. The church tower, although also from this period, was restored in the middle of the 19th century. The reredos, which depicts the Last Supper, is also 19th century.

== Memorials ==
Although Bishop Carpenter's plan to make the church a joint cathedral with Worcester did not come to fruition, it was he who rededicated the church to the Holy Trinity. On his death in 1476 he was buried in the crypt underneath the altar. The stone cadaver from his cadaver tomb is in the chancel, with a Purbeck marble canopy donated in 1853 by Oriel College, Oxford, where he had been Provost.

== Churchyard ==
The churchyard contains war graves of a soldier and officer of the Gloucestershire Regiment and a Royal Flying Corps officer of World War I.

== Archives ==
Parish records for Holy Trinity church, Westbury-on-Trym, Bristol are held at Bristol Archives (Ref. P.HTW) (online catalogue) including baptism, marriage and burial registers. The archive also includes records of the incumbent, churchwardens, overseer of the poor, parochial church council, charities, Redland Chapel, schools and societies and vestry plus plans and photographs.

== See also ==
- Churches in Bristol
- Grade I listed buildings in Bristol
