= Former Bank of England, Bristol =

Building in Bristol, England

Former Bank of England
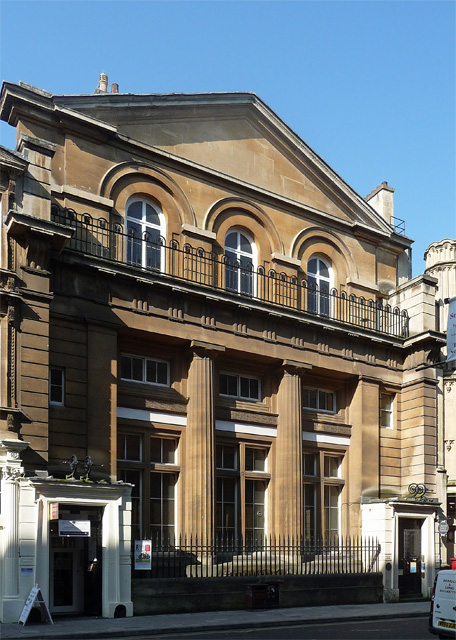
- Former Bank of England Branch, Broad Street, Bristol (geograph 3755097)

- Location within Bristol

General information
- Location: Bristol, England
- Coordinates: 51.455257°N 2.593932°W
- Construction started: 1844
- Completed: 1847
- Client: Bank of England

Design and construction
- Architect: Charles Robert Cockerell

The Former Bank of England (grid reference ST592733) is a historic building at 13/14 Broad Street in Bristol, England. It was built as the site of a branch of The Bank of England.

It was built in 1844-47 by Charles Robert Cockerell with a Doric pseudo-portico of three bays recessed between low pavilions: the attic storey is arcaded with a triangular pediment .

It has been designated by Historic England as a Grade I listed building.

The building is now used as the Bristol Citizens Advice Bureau.

- Grade I listed buildings in Bristol
