= John Carpenter (bishop of Worcester) =

Bishop of Worcester (1399–1476)

- Bishop of Worcester
- Appointed: 20 December 1443
- Term ended: July 1476
- Predecessor: Thomas Bourchier
- Successor: John Alcock

Orders
- Consecration: 22 March 1444

Personal details
- Born: 4 May 1399 Westbury on Trym, Bristol, England
- Died: after July 1476 Northwick, Worcestershire, England
- Denomination: Catholic

John Carpenter (1399–1476) was an English bishop, provost, and university chancellor.

== Early life ==
Carpenter's father was John Carpenter the elder, born around 1362 to Richard or Renaud Carpenter of Cambrai and his wife Christina of London. John Carpenter the bishop was also known as John Carpenter the elder. He had three siblings, Margery, John the younger, and William. His two brothers were baptised in Hereford. He was baptised on 4 May 1399 in St Peter's Church, Westbury on Trym, Bristol, England. He had a notable uncle also called John Carpenter, town clerk of London.

According to Douglas-Smith, Carpenter was Warden of St. Anthony's Hospital, London and Rector of St. Mary Magdalen. A Master John Carpenter, then King's clerk, is referred to in Patent Rolls of 17 March 1433 and 9 July 1435, the first being a grant for life of the wardenship. John Carpenter, bishop of Worcester, appears as a plaintiff in the Plea Rolls of the Common Pleas, in 1450, and is also described as the warden of the Hospital of St Anthony.

== Bishop and chancellor ==
Carpenter was Provost of Oriel College, Oxford, from 1428 to 1444, and Chancellor of the University of Oxford in 1437. Carpenter was nominated on 20 December 1443 and consecrated as Bishop of Worcester on 22 March 1444. He resigned the see in July 1476. Carpenter died in 1476 in Northwick, Worcestershire, England, and was buried in Westbury on Trym.

== Church at Westbury on Trym ==
Carpenter was buried at Holy Trinity Church, Westbury on Trym, in 1476. He had been baptised at the same church, which at that time was dedicated to St Peter and St Paul. Soon after Carpenter became bishop he sought to raise the status of St Peter's to that of a joint cathedral with Worcester, and styled himself "Bishop of Worcester and Westbury". He had the building rededicated to the Holy Trinity. Carpenter added a chancel, and a chapel dedicated to St Oswald, to the fabric. He also refounded and rebuilt Westbury College.

Carpenter was buried in the crypt underneath the altar. His memorial was originally a cadaver tomb, with the bishop in full episcopal attire above an enclosure containing a sculpture of a cadaver or skeleton. This tomb was broken up in 1646, during the Civil War, by soldiers from the Bristol garrison. In 1851 the stone cadaver was found in the crypt of the chapel. This was incorporated in 1853 into a new canopied memorial of Purbeck marble, marked on top with a bishop's crozier. Over the porch entrance doorway is a statue of Bishop Carpenter, of unknown date. At some time headless, the statue was restored in the early 20th century.

Academic offices
Preceded by Nicholas Herry	Provost of Oriel College, Oxford; 1428–1435	Succeeded by Walter Lyhert
Preceded by Thomas Bourchier	Chancellor of the University of Oxford; 1437–1438	Succeeded by Richard Praty
Catholic Church titles
Preceded by Thomas Bourchier	Bishop of Worcester; 1443–1476	Succeeded by John Alcock
