= Old Post Office, Bristol =

Building in Bristol, England

Old Post Office
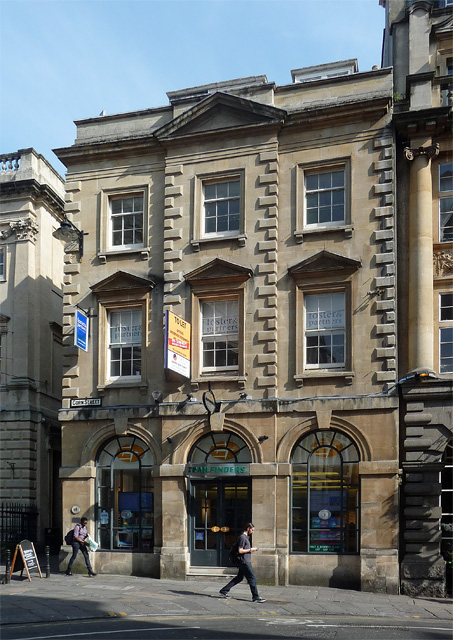

- Location within Bristol

General information
- Location: Bristol, England
- Coordinates: 51.4536°N 2.5958°W
- Completed: 1746

Design and construction
- Architect: Samuel Glascodine

The Old Post Office (grid reference ST587729) is a historic building at 48 Corn Street in Bristol, England.

It was built in 1746 by Samuel Glascodine to complement The Exchange, acting as the central post office for the city of Bristol for over 200 years. It was part rebuilt as a facsimile of the original in 1993 and is now used as an office.

It has been designated by Historic England as a Grade I listed building.

== See also ==
- Grade I listed buildings in Bristol
