= Avon Bridge =

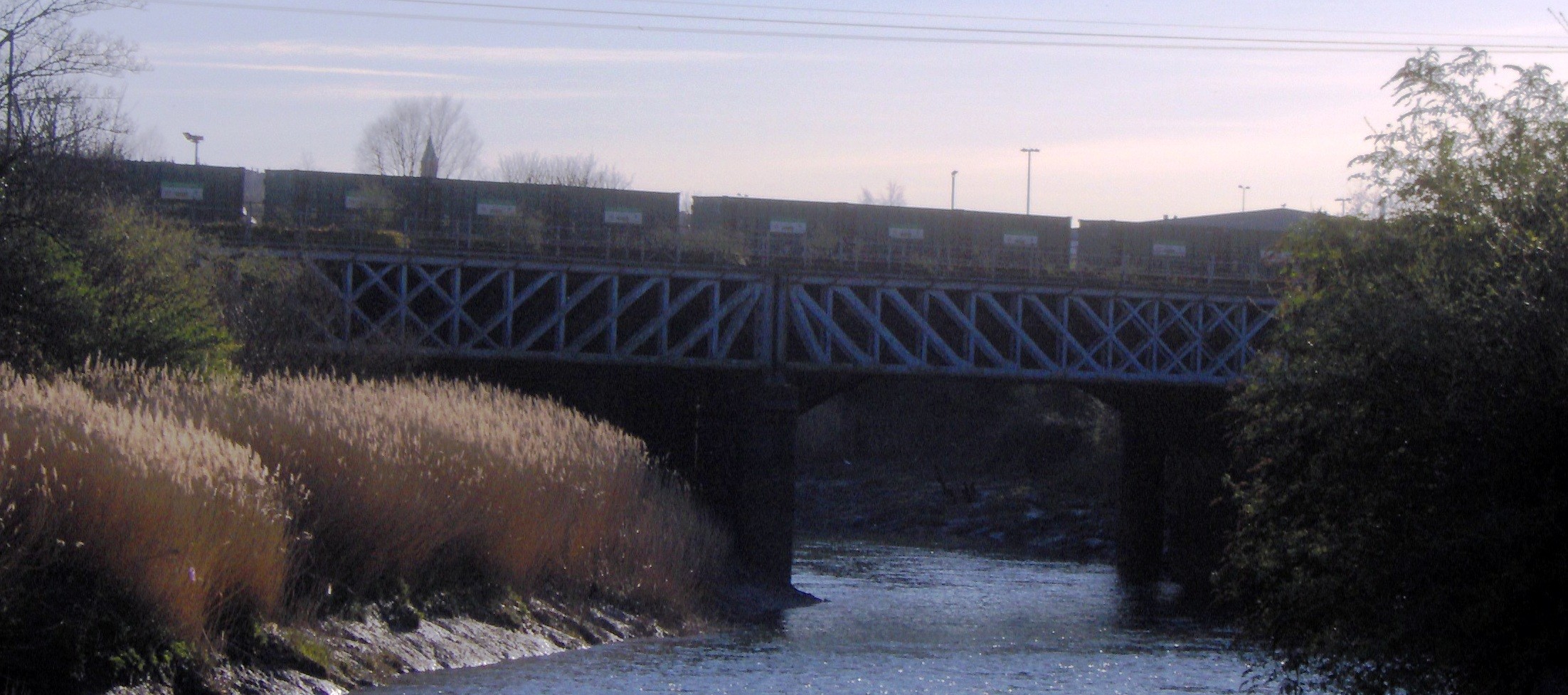
- Railway Bridge over the Avon
- Coordinates: 51.4497°N 2.5578°W
- Carries: Great Western Main Line
- Crosses: River Avon, Bristol
- Locale: Bristol, England
- Heritage status: Grade I

History
- Architect: Isambard Kingdom Brunel

Location
- Interactive map of Avon Bridge

The Avon Bridge is a railway bridge over the River Avon in Brislington, Bristol, England. It was built in 1839 by Isambard Kingdom Brunel and has been designated by Historic England as a Grade I listed building. The contract was originally awarded to William Ranger, who fell behind with the build and had his construction plant seized so the Great Western Railway company could finish construction. Ranger started legal proceedings against the company, but they were eventually quashed by Lord Cranworth.

The bridge carries the Great Western Main Line over the River Avon into Bristol Temple Meads station, approximately 300 metres (980 ft) west (downstream) of Netham Weir.

== Construction ==
The Great Western Railway company engaged Isambard Kingdom Brunel to build a bridge on the eastern approach to Bristol Temple Meads. Brunel designed a masonry bridge with a wide central arch and a smaller arch on either side; all three arches are in a gothic style. The entire structure is made of squared stone with semi-octagonal buttresses and was completed in 1839. Subsequently, a truss girder bridge was added on either side of the Avon Bridge to widen it, obscuring the structure. The structure became Grade I Listed on 8 June 1990.

The contract for building the bridge went to William Ranger in March 1836, with work beginning that April. The stone for the bridge was intended to be taken from the cutting of the nearby No. 1 Tunnel. Ranger fell behind schedule, and by 1838, when shareholders had intended the line to be open, Great Western Railway declared his work unsatisfactory. Under the terms of their contract with him they seized his plant to complete the works themselves. Ranger valued his plant at £70,000 (equivalent to £6,278,700 in 2025), and started legal proceeding against the Great Western Railway, stating he had been deceived about the nature of the stone he was cutting into, believing it was sandstone and discovering it was Pennant stone. He also complained that Brunel was a shareholder of the Great Western Railway company, a fact Ranger was not aware of when he took the contract. The case was eventually settled by the Lord Cranworth, who stated that Ranger could not reject terms of the contract.

== See also ==
- Grade I listed buildings in Bristol
