= Bristol Central Library =

Public library in Bristol, England

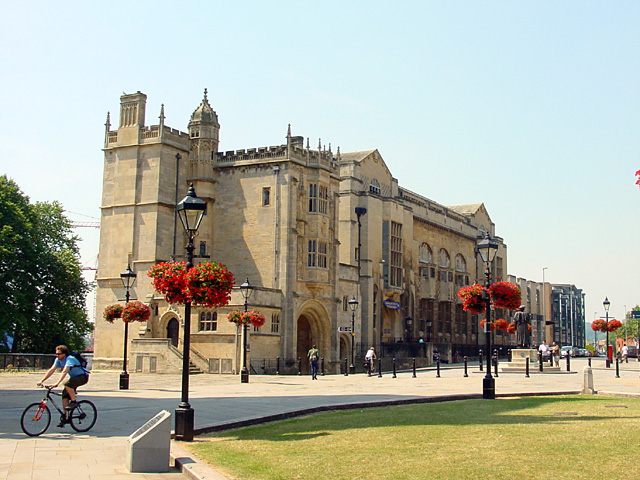
- The Library, with the Abbey Gatehouse on the left

- Location within Bristol

General information
- Location: Bristol, England
- Coordinates: 51.452155°N 2.602390°W
- Completed: 1906
- Cost: £30,000

Design and construction
- Architect: Charles Holden

Bristol Central Library is a historic building on the south side of College Green, Bristol, England. It contains the main collections of Bristol's public library.

Built in 1906 by Charles Holden, its design was influential in the development of Edwardian Free Style architecture. Holden would later go on to build the Edward VII Memorial Wing of the Bristol Royal Infirmary, giving Bristol two of its most highly regarded Edwardian buildings. The Library has been designated by Historic England as a Grade I listed building.

== Construction ==
In 1899 Vincent Stuckey Lean left a bequest of £50,000 to replace Bristol's old public library building on King Street. An architectural competition was organised, and won by the firm of H. Percy Adams with designs by his assistant Charles Holden, at a cost of £30,000. The RIBA also credits involvement of Henry Percy Adams, along with Holden, for the reference library reading room.

The new library was built on land adjacent to the historic Abbey Gatehouse, and opened in 1906.

== Exterior architecture ==
Because of the slope of the site, which falls away sharply to the south, the building has two basement levels creating five visible storeys at the rear, while only three storeys are visible at the front. The north front of the building is a blend of Tudor Revival and Modern Movement styles, designed to harmonise with the adjoining Abbey Gatehouse.

The rear facades to the south and east are in a plainer style, with vertical features such as towers and flat buttresses being used to frame the great mass of the building. Holden's approach to handling large volumes, of which his design for the Library was one of the most highly regarded examples, made him influential within the Modern Movement. For this he has been compared with his contemporary Charles Rennie Mackintosh.

A western extension was built in 1967, in a design sympathetic to the original building.

== Interior architecture ==
In contrast to the exterior, the interior is largely Neoclassical, with extensive use being made of round-arched vaulting. The entrance hall, which is at the eastern end of the north front, has vaulting faced in turquoise glass mosaic. A variety of different kinds of marble is used for the flooring and other facings in the entrance hall and for the main staircase.

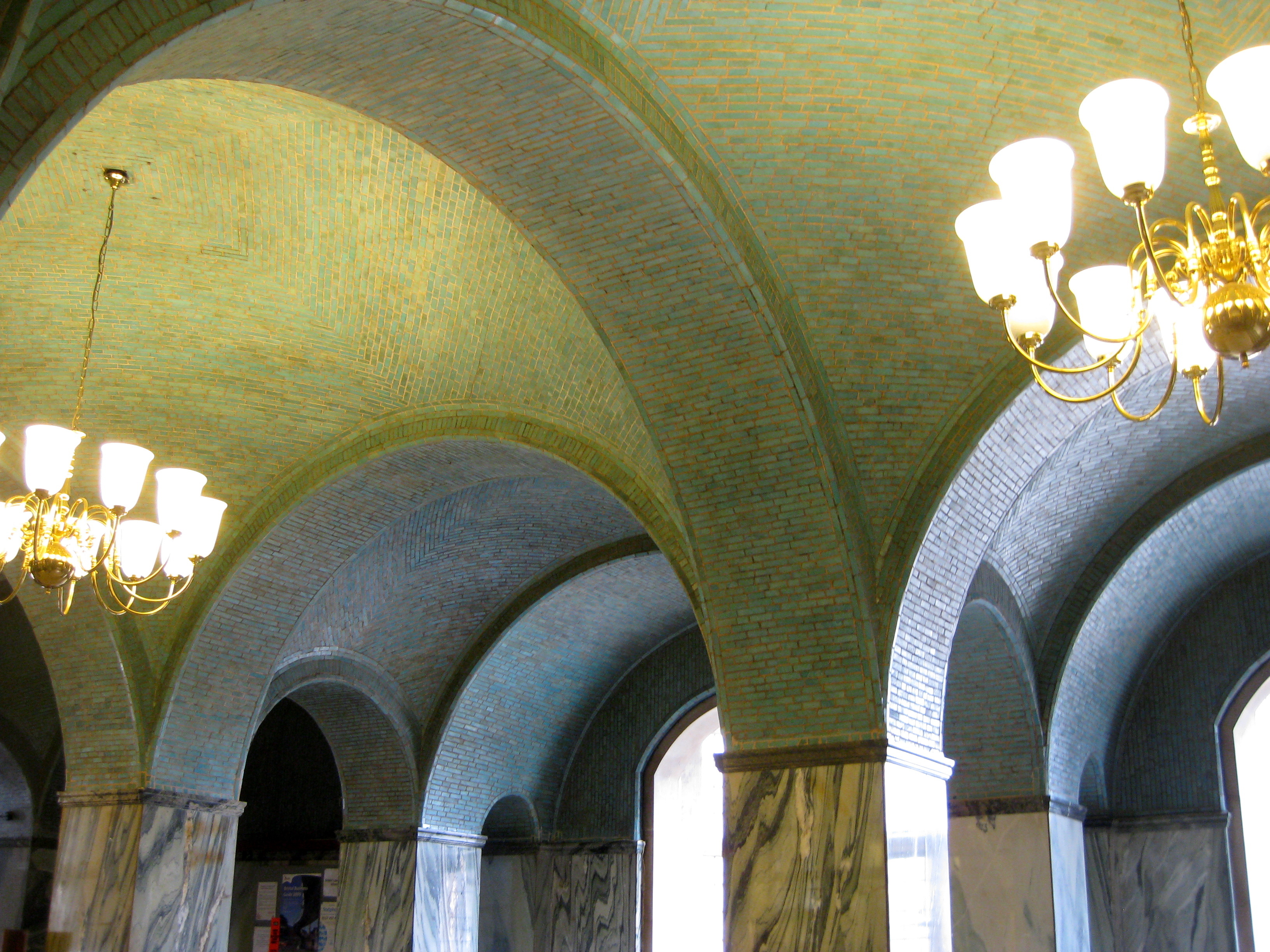
Vaulting in the entrance hall

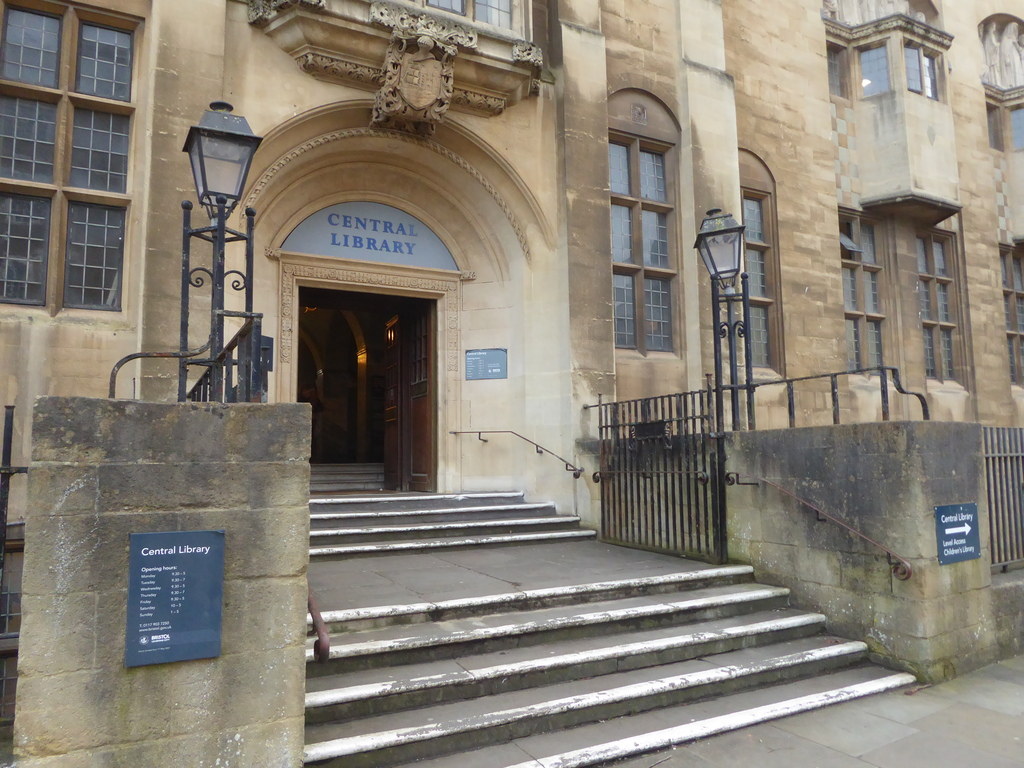
Entrance to Bristol Central Library from Deanery Road

The ground floor next to the entrance hall contains the Lending Library. Above it is the Reference Library Reading Room, whose space includes the first floor and two tiers of galleries. It is tunnel vaulted, with glass above.

Next to the Reading Room is the Bristol Room, which contains antique furniture and fittings brought from the old reading room in King Street, including an ornate oak overmantel carved by Grinling Gibbons.

The building's size created a need to transmit natural light throughout the interior. Holden made extensive use of skylights, glass screens and glass-block roof and floor panels.

== See also ==
- Grade I listed buildings in Bristol

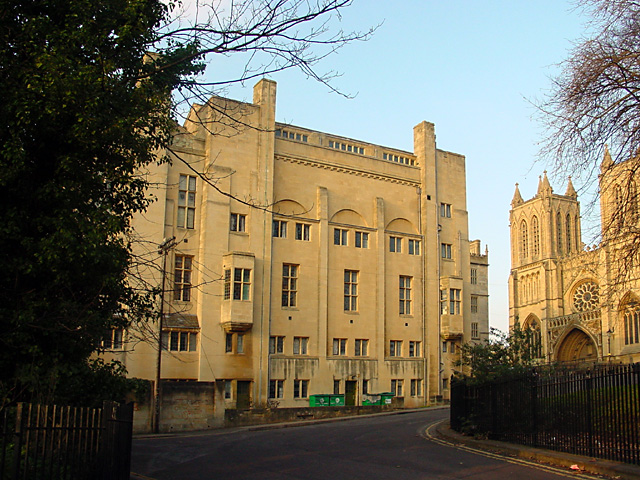
Rear view of the library, with the west towers of Bristol Cathedral on the right
