= Equestrian statue of William III, Bristol =

Statue in Queen Square, Bristol, England

Coordinates: 51°27′02″N 2°35′41″W

Equestrian statue of William III
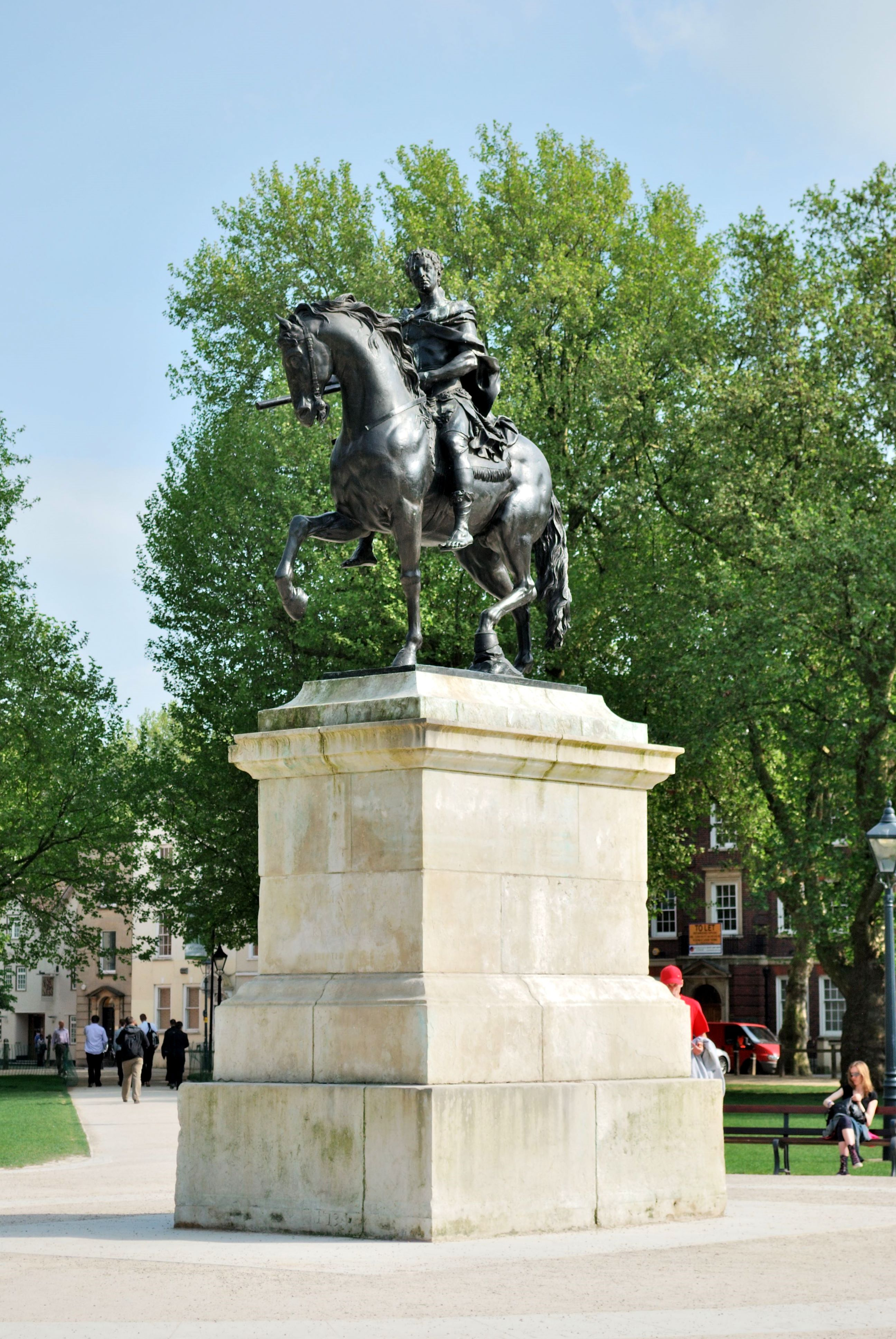
- The statue in 2011
- Artist: John Michael Rysbrack
- Year: 1733
- Type: Bronze
- Location: Bristol

The equestrian statue of William III is a historic statue in the centre of Queen Square in Bristol, England. It is a Grade I listed building.

The statue of William III by John Michael Rysbrack, cast in 1733 and erected in 1736 to signify Bristol's Whig support of the Crown and Parliament Recognition Act 1689. The original plan was to have a statue of George II.

During World War II the statue was moved to Badminton and subsequently restored and returned to the square in 1948.

The bronze statue is on a Portland ashlar pedestal with a moulded plinth and cornice. It depicts the king in Roman dress.

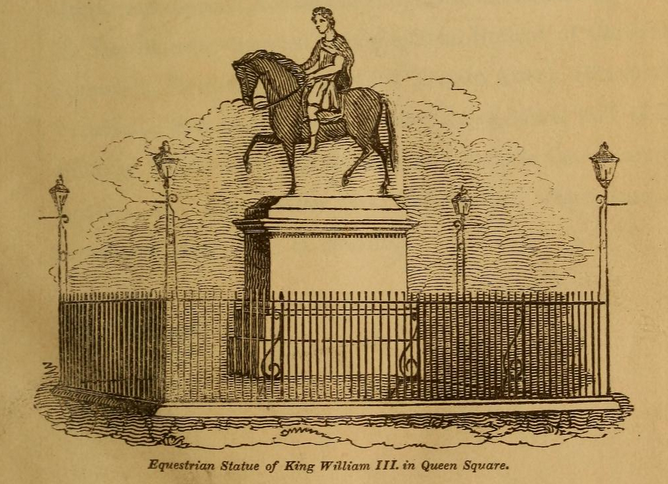
Engraving of the statue, published in Chilcott's Descriptive History of Bristol, 1846

== See also ==
- Grade I listed buildings in Bristol
- List of public art in Bristol
