= Colstons Almshouses =

Almshouse in Bristol, England

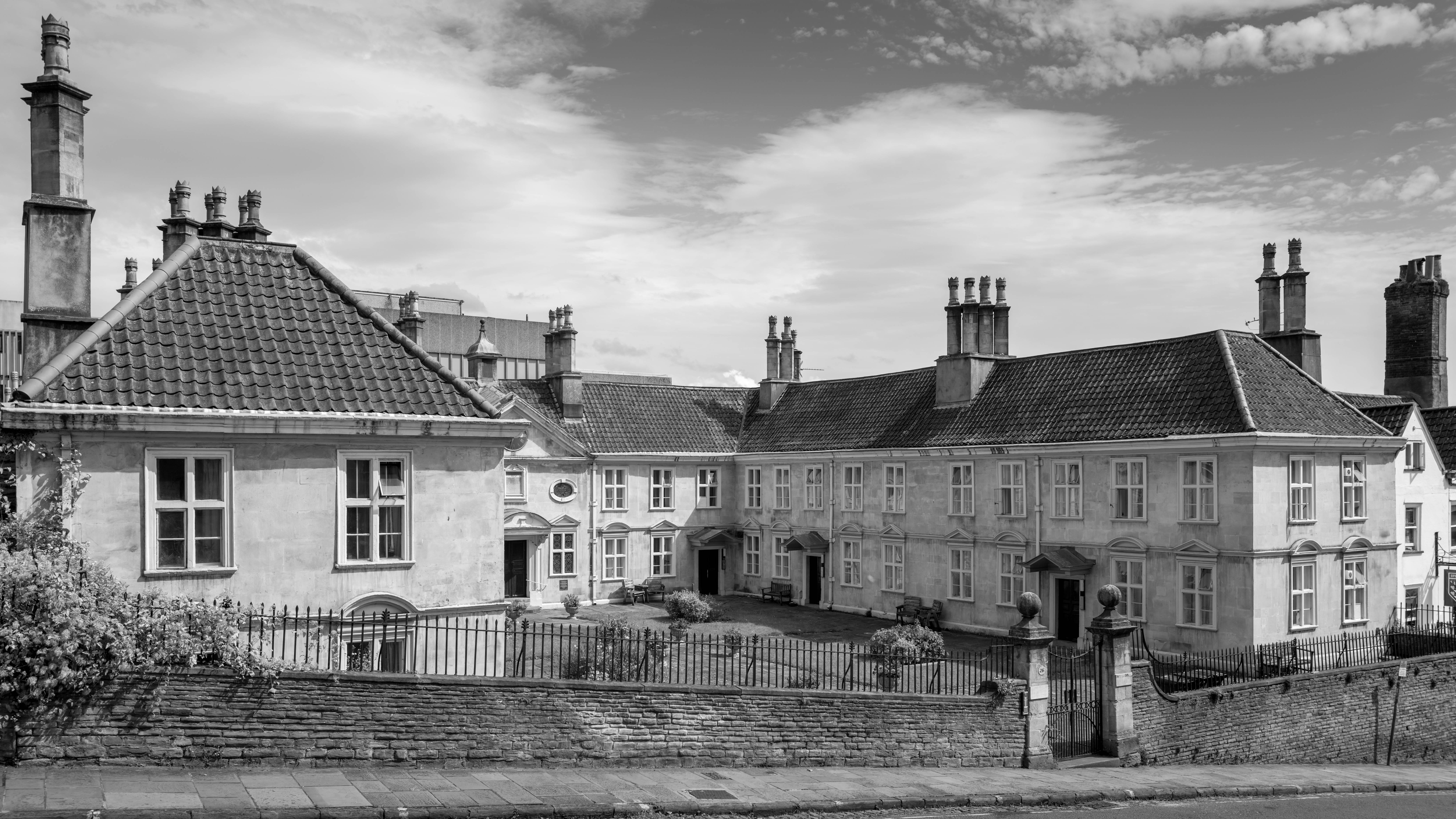
- Colstons Almshouses

- Location within Bristol

General information
- Location: Bristol, England
- Coordinates: 51°27′29″N 2°35′54″W
- Completed: 1691
- Client: Edward Colston

Colstons Almshouses is a historic building on St Michaels Hill, Bristol, England. It was built in 1691 and has been designated by Historic England as a Grade I listed building. The front wall and gates are also Grade I listed. They are named after the Bristol-born merchant, philanthropist, slave trader, and Member of Parliament Edward Colston.

The almshouses were founded by Edward Colston for twelve inmates. They were expected to attend the chapel twice a day for a prayer reading. The baroque chapel contains panels made from ships' timbers and has a barrel vault. On the front wall of the chapel is a plaque to Colston.

It is a two-storey limestone building with hipped roofs with triangular canopies over the individual front doors. The building is U-shaped, arranged around a courtyard with a wall forming the front of the complex. The windows are divided by stone mullions and transoms. There is a central bell cupola.

The building was renovated in 1988. The home provides twelve one-bedroom flats, laundry and communal lounge and a garden. The Society of Merchant Venturers is the trustee for the Almshouses.

== See also ==
- Grade I listed buildings in Bristol
- List of British almshouses
