= Coelebs in Search of a Wife =

1808 novel by Hannah More

Cœlebs in Search of a Wife
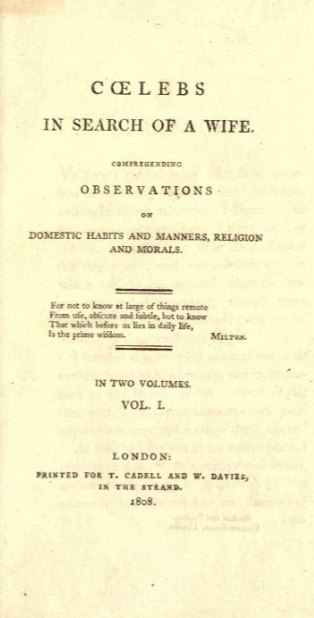
- Title page for Coelebs in Search of a Wife (1808)
- Author: Hannah More
- Language: English
- Publisher: T[homas] Cadell and W[illiam] Davies
- Publication date: 1808
- Publication place: London, United Kingdom
- OCLC: 420533354
- Followed by: Coelebs Married

Coelebs in Search of a Wife (1808), titled in full as Coelebs in Search of a Wife. Comprehending Observations on Domestic Habits and Manners, Religion and Morals., is a novel by the British Christian moralist Hannah More. It was followed by Coelebs Married in 1814.

The novel focuses on Coelebs—whose name is a Latin word meaning "single, unmarried"—a well-to-do young man who tries to find a wife who can meet the lofty moral requirements laid down by his now-deceased mother.

Coelebs in Search of a Wife was extremely popular when it was published. It combined its novelistic narrative with religious lessons, which helped it to become the first nineteenth century novel to be accepted enthusiastically by the large religious reading public (in Britain, the novel had often been seen as an unrespectable and even immoral literary form).

Maria Edgeworth, in an 1810 letter to Mrs. Ruxton, claims that the bachelor was modelled on a Mr. Harford of Blaise Castle.

Frank Muir said, "It is now high on the list of the world's most unreadable books".
