= John Scandrett Harford =

English painter

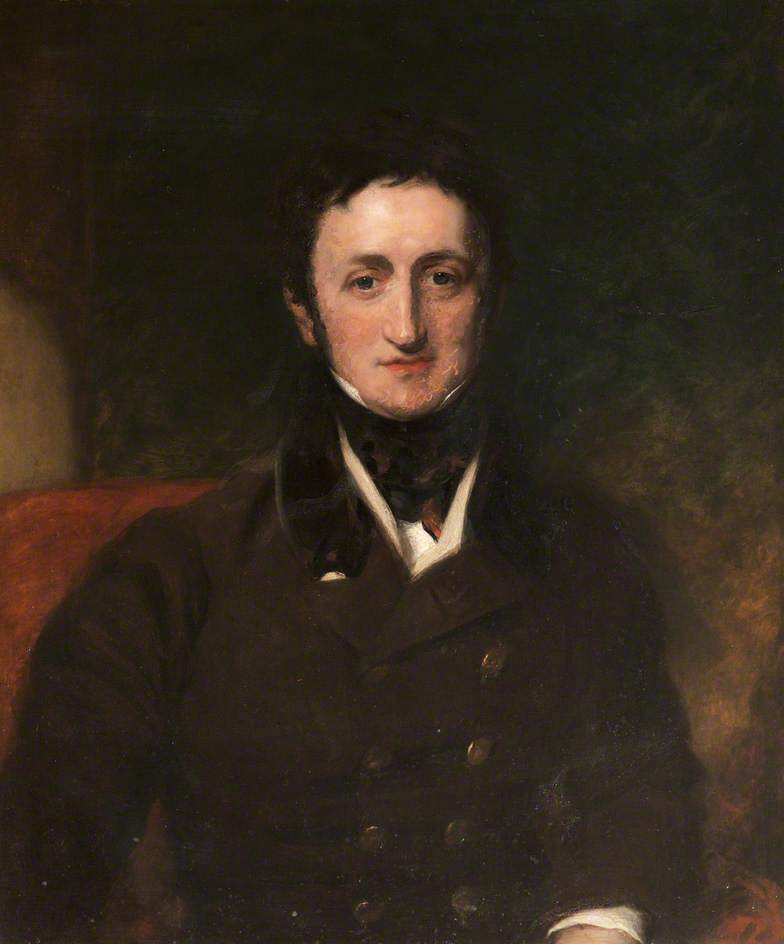
- John Scandrett Harford, portrait after Sir Thomas Lawrence
- Born: 8 October 1785; Bristol
- Died: 16 April 1866 (aged 80); Blaise Castle, Bristol

John Scandrett Harford, FRS (8 October 1785 – 16 April 1866) was a British banker, benefactor and abolitionist.

== Early life and background ==
Harford was the son of John Scandrett Harford, a prominent banker in Bristol. By the end of the 18th century the elder John Scandrett Harford was a wealthy landowner, and a staunch Quaker. He married Mary Gray, daughter of Abraham Gray of Tottenham.

John Scandrett Harford the younger had a Quaker upbringing, but in 1809 was baptised in the Church of England, at Chelwood. He had schooling under Charles Lloyd at Peterley House, Great Missenden. He was admitted to Christ's College, Cambridge in 1820, and was there for a number of terms. He was an abolitionist and friend of William Wilberforce.

== Property ==
The Harford properties included the Blaise Castle Estate at Henbury. This had belonged to Thomas Farr, who went bankrupt in 1778 following outbreak of the American Revolutionary War. The estate then changed hands a number of times before John Harford the elder purchased the land and buildings. John Harford the Elder had a plain but substantial house built and asked the landscape architect Humphry Repton to lay out the grounds. Repton became a partner of John Nash, whom Harford commissioned to design a group of cottages, Blaise Hamlet, as homes for his retired servants.

Nash created sketches of the cottages, which George Repton built. Diamond Cottage is an example of the extremely picturesque style of the cottages.

In 1819, Harford also acquired the Peterwell estate at Lampeter, making the purchase jointly with his younger brothers. It was previously owned by his father-in-law, Richard Hart Davis, who had built c.1812 a house within its bounds. The estate descended to his nephew John Battersby Harford, who remodelled the house in the Italianate style in 1859 as Falcondale.

== Educational interests ==
John Harford the Elder was a patron of Hannah More's schools in Somerset in the 1790s. Maria Edgeworth claimed that the main character in More's popular novel Coelebs in Search of a Wife was modeled on the younger Harford.

In spring 1820, Harford met Thomas Burgess, the bishop of St Davids, at the home of Henry Ryder, the bishop of Gloucester. Burgess mentioned his 'projected college for clerical education in South Wales,' although at this time 'he did not appear to be sanguine in the hope of speedily realising the plan.' Harford knew that a college at Lampeter 'would tend to civilise and improve the vicinity.' In the autumn of 1820, Harford offered to donate to Burgess the site of Lampeter Castle, 'Castle Field' or 'Cae Castell' in Welsh, which, as Lords of the Manor of Lampeter, he and his brothers now owned. As such, it is on land donated by Harford that the Lampeter campus of the University of Wales Trinity Saint David (formerly St David's College) now stands. A bust of Harford is in the collection of the University. Two halls of residence at the university, Harford I and Harford II, are also named after him.

== Later life ==
Harford was appointed High Sheriff of Cardiganshire for 1825–26.

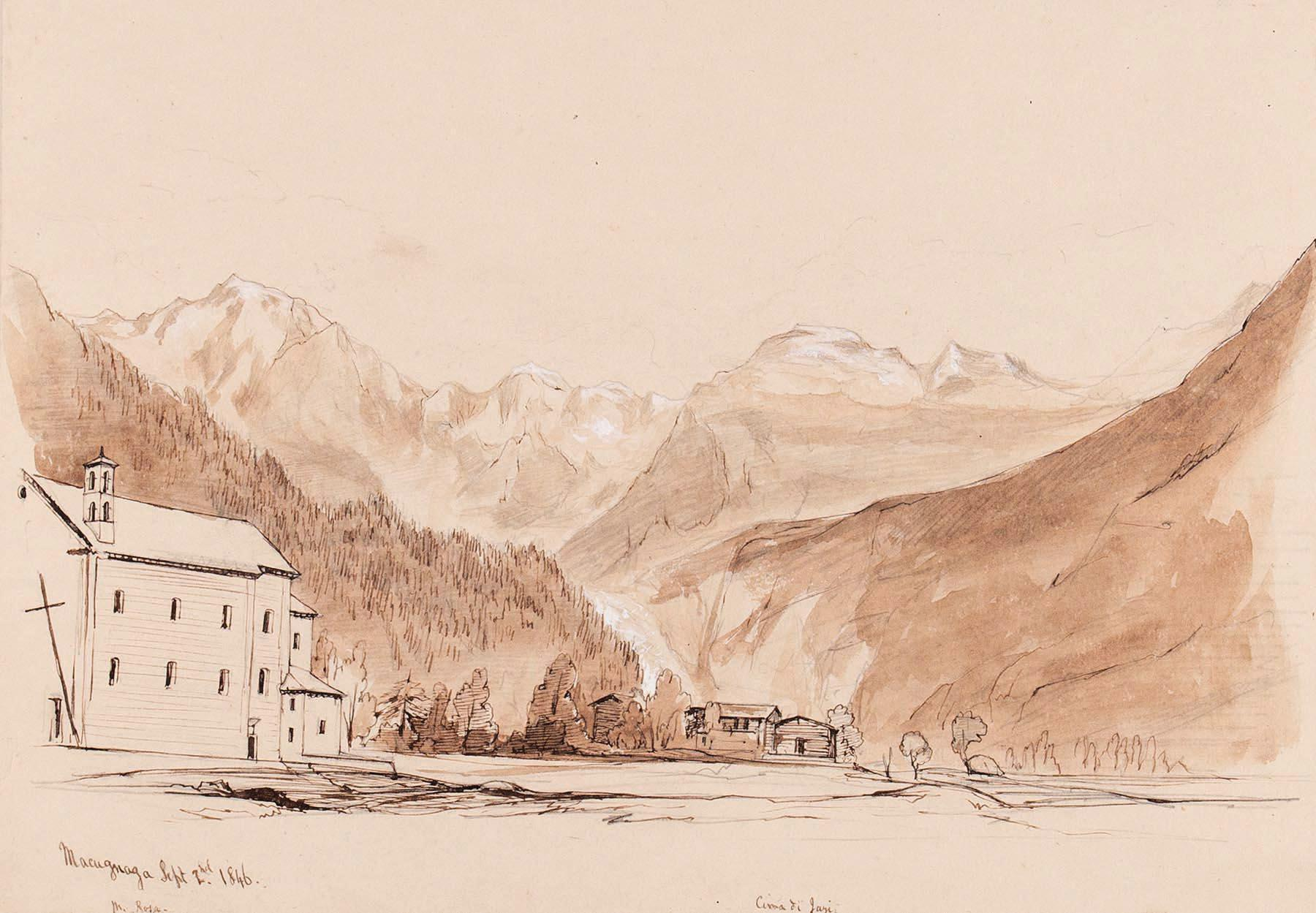
Macugnaga, M. Rosa/ Cima di Jagi (1846) by John Scandrett Harford

He was also a moderately successful artist, and his oil paintings can often be found at auctions in the UK. He was elected a Fellow of the Royal Society in 1823, and was the founding President of what is now the Royal West of England Academy (then the Bristol Academy of Fine Arts) from its inception in 1844 until 1859. In later life he went blind, and he died at Blaise Castle in 1866.

== Family ==
Harford in 1812 married Louisa, the daughter of Richard Hart Davis. He died without children at Blaise Castle, his heir being John Battersby Harford, a nephew.

== Archives ==
Correspondence, journals and personal papers of John Scandrett Harford and the Harford family are held by Bristol Archives (Ref. 28048) (online catalogue). Additional correspondence including letters sent by William Wilberforce to Harford is held by Duke University: William R Perkin Library. There also records of the Peterwell and Falcondale estates of the Harford family at the National Library of Wales.

== Published works ==
- Some account of the life of Thomas Paine, Bristol, 1819
- Aeschylus : Agamemnon....Translated from Greek by J. S. Harford, London : Murray, 1831
- Life of Thomas Burgess, London: Eyre & Spottiswood, 1840. 2nd ed. London : Eyre, 1841
- Life of Michaelangelo Buonarroti, Longman & Roberts, 1857; Spottiswoode & Co., 1858
- Recollections of William Wilberforce, 1st ed., Longman, Green, Longman, Roberts, & Green, London, 1864

== See also ==
- Royal West of England Academy
