= Great Gatehouse, Bristol =

Gatehouse in Bristol, England

Great Gatehouse
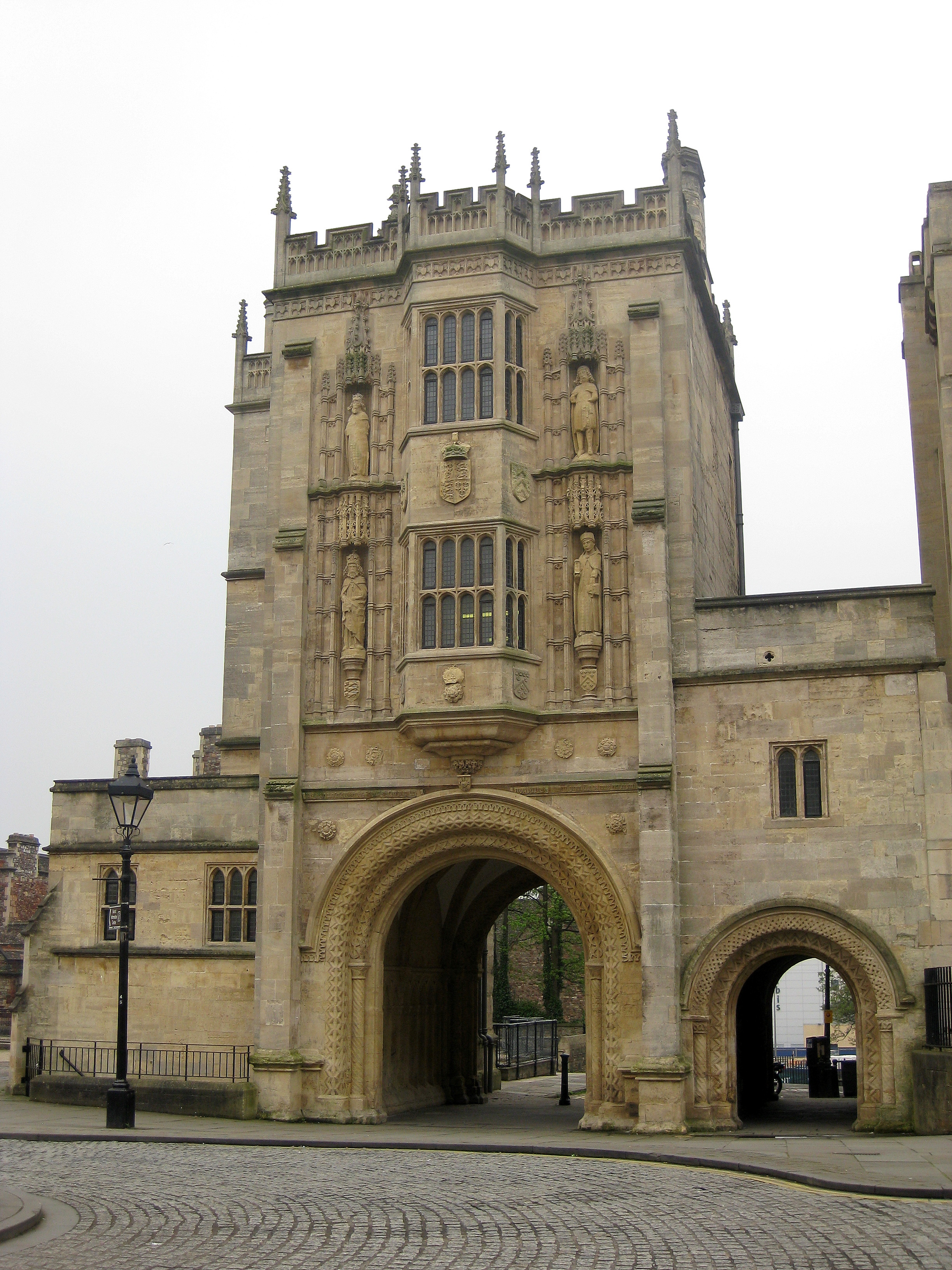
- The north front.

- Location within Bristol

General information
- Location: Bristol, England
- Coordinates: 51.4517°N 2.6015°W
- Construction started: 12th century

The Great Gatehouse (grid reference ST583727), also known as the Abbey Gatehouse, is a historic building on the south side of College Green in Bristol, England. Its earliest parts date back to around 1170. It was the gatehouse for St Augustine's Abbey, which was the precursor of Bristol Cathedral. The gatehouse stands to the cathedral's west, and to its own west it is abutted by the Bristol Central Library building. The library's architectural design incorporated many of the gatehouse's features.

The sculptural decorations on the archways of the gatehouse contain early examples of the use of pointed arches in England. The gatehouse has been designated by Historic England as a Grade I listed building.

== History ==
St Augustine's Abbey was founded in 1140. The earliest parts of the gatehouse were built by around 1170, as the main entrance of the monastic precinct, giving access to its courtyard.

The gatehouse was one of a number of the abbey's monastic buildings which survived the Dissolution of the Monasteries, after which in 1542 the abbey became Bristol Cathedral. A deanery was later built adjoining the west side of the gatehouse. The deanery was demolished and its place abutting the gatehouse was taken by the new Bristol Central Library building in 1906.

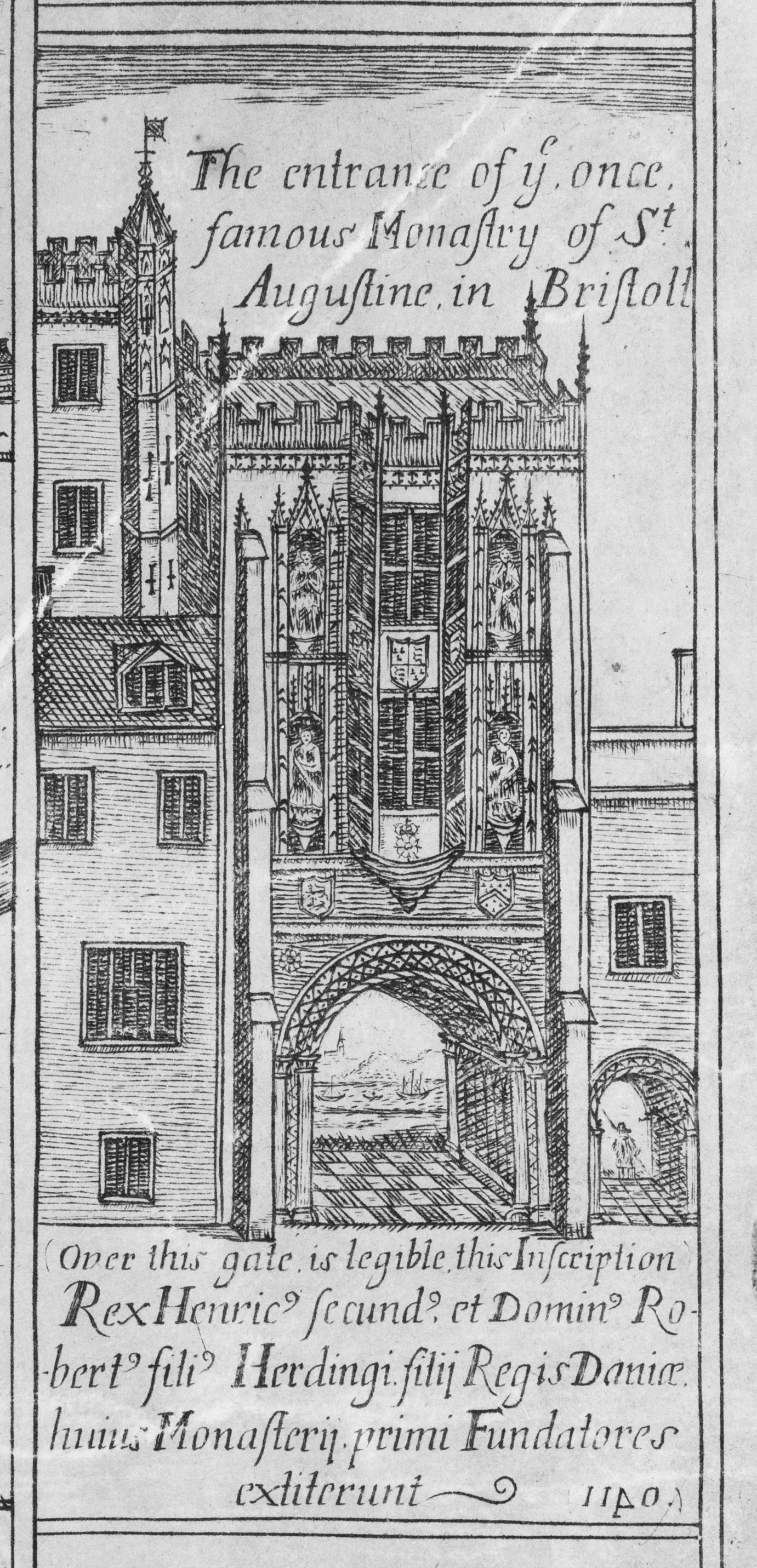
The entrance of the once famous Monastery of St Augustine in Bristol (1673)

== Architecture ==
The building consists of two late Norman archways, a carriage gateway and a smaller postern gate for pedestrians, surmounted by a late Perpendicular gatehouse, with an adjoining tower. The unweathered appearance of the archways led to a public debate between 19th century commentators as to whether the archways had been rebuilt since the 12th century, but the prevailing view, as argued in the 19th century by George Edmund Street, is that they are probably the original ones.

Both the north and south arches of the carriage gateway are densely decorated with carved mouldings. Inside is a ribbed vault and walls with carved interlaced arcading. The arcading contains pointed arches, which arise from the intersections of interlaced round arches, just as in the cathedral's chapter house. The similarities in the arcading, and in the two buildings' decorative patterns using a variety of motifs like chevron and nailhead, support the dating of the archways to about the same time as the chapter house, in the 12th century.

The southern side of the carriage gateway is the most elaborate, with the archway having four courses of moulding. The postern gate has carved mouldings around the northern arch but is unvaulted and otherwise plain.

The gatehouse and tower were additions by abbot John Newland around 1500. The gatehouse is embellished with two-storey oriels with mullion and transom windows, two-storey statuary niches and panelled parapets. These structures were restored by John Loughborough Pearson in 1888, who succeeded in retaining many of the features of their original design. He restored the oriels, which at some point had been replaced by sash windows. The single-storey eastern extension is also 19th century.

== Influence ==
Charles Holden's design in 1906 for the adjoining Central Bristol Library building echoed many features of the gatehouse. The library has tall oriels with mullions and transoms, a round entrance arch and other decorations in the Tudor Revival style. The shape of the gatehouse itself is imitated by the two tower-like projections at either end of the library's front.

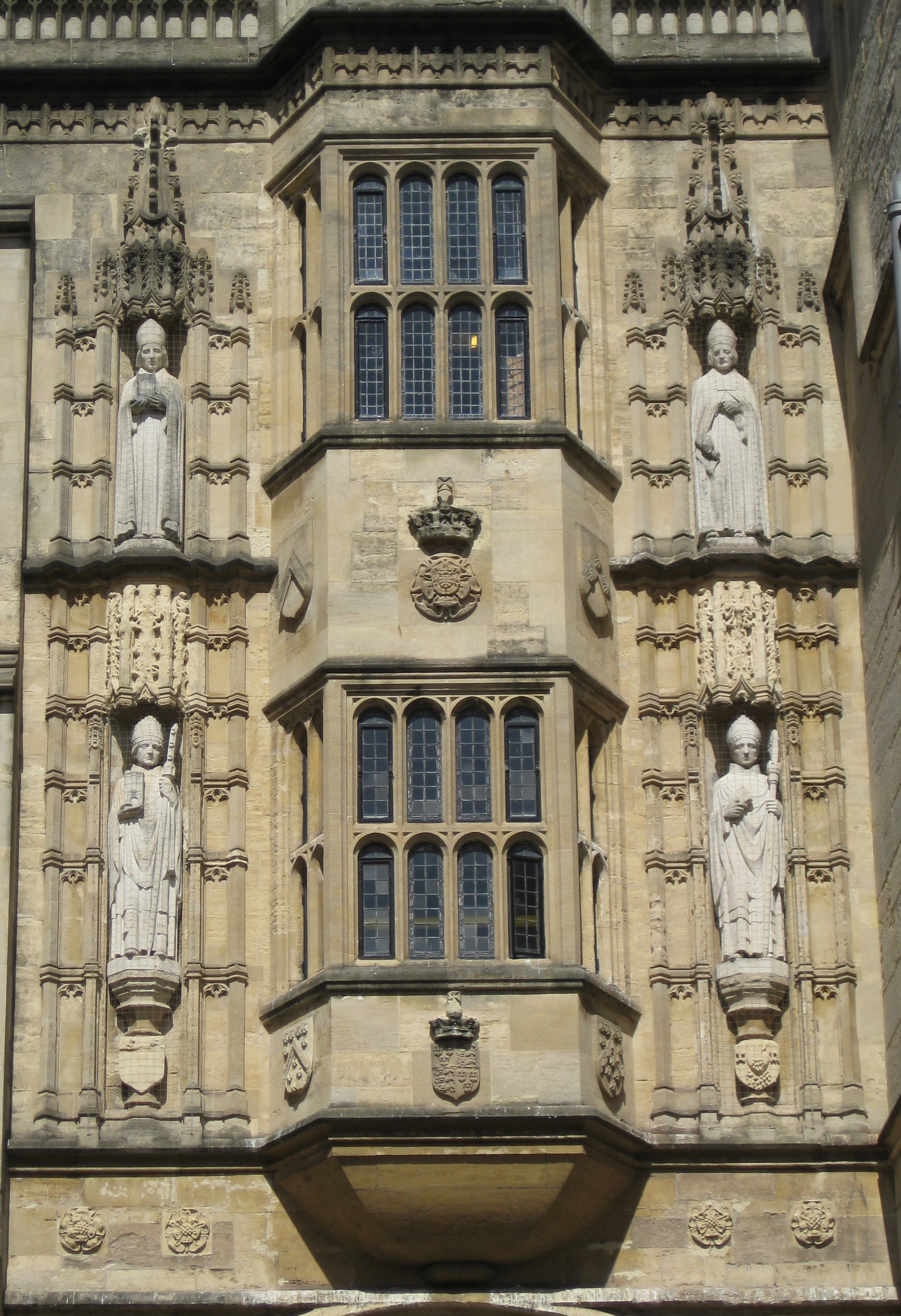
Detail, south side of gatehouse.

Charles Pibworth, the Bristolian sculptor who created the relief figures on the north front of the library, also carved the statues of four abbots on the south side of the gatehouse, placed there in 1914.

== See also ==
- Grade I listed buildings in Bristol
- List of non-ecclesiastical works by J. L. Pearson
