= Westbury College Gatehouse =

Gatehouse in Bristol, England

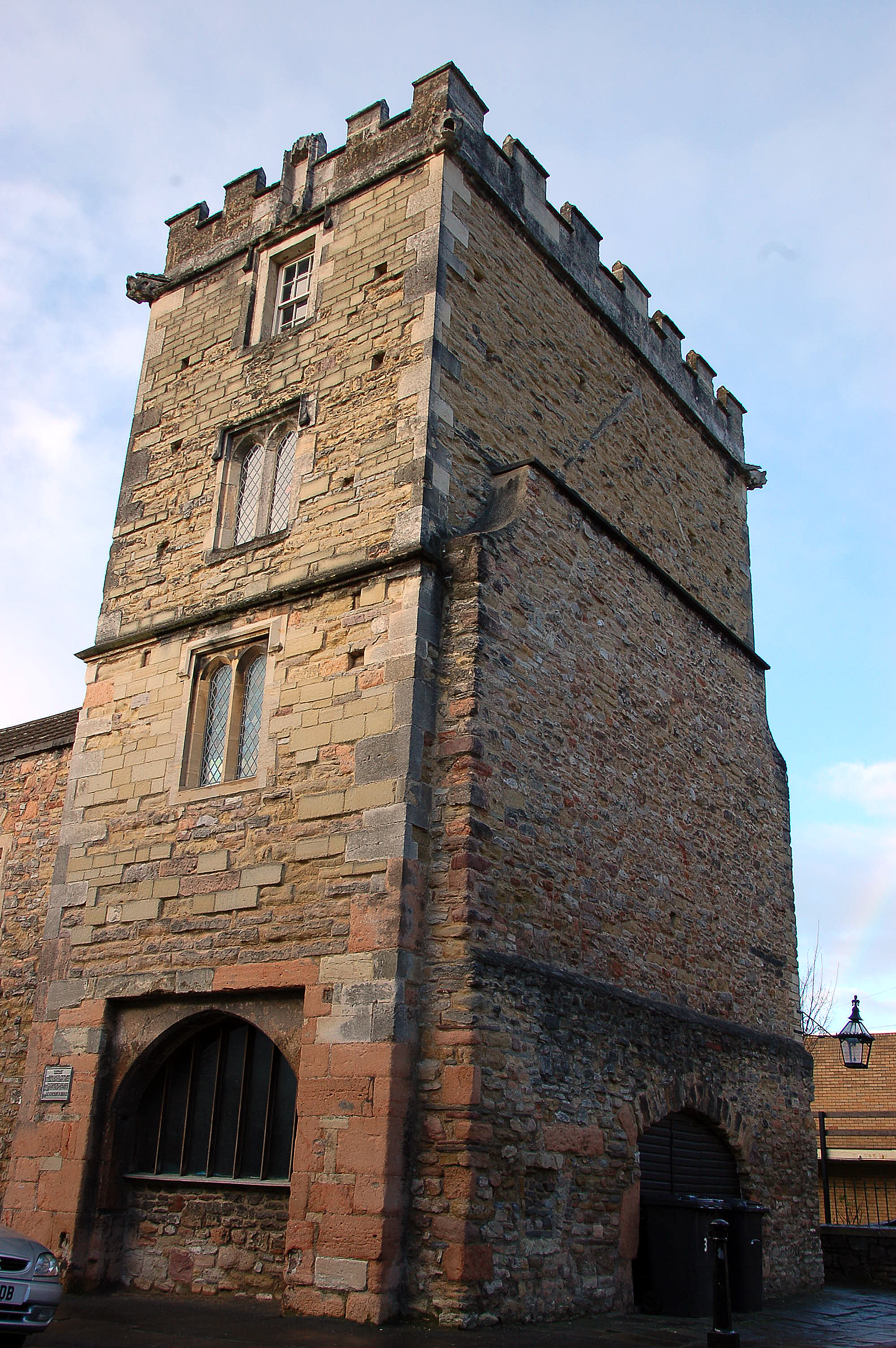
- Westbury College Gatehouse

- Location within Bristol

General information
- Location: Bristol, England
- Coordinates: 51.4945°N 2.6171°W
- Grid ref: ST573775
- Construction started: 1459
- Completed: 1469

Westbury College Gatehouse is a 15th-century gatehouse to the 13th-century college of priests in Westbury-on-Trym, Bristol, England, and now a National Trust property.

== History ==
The gatehouse originally formed part of Westbury College, a residence for the dean and canons of Holy Trinity Church. The college building was fortified with towers, turrets and battlements surrounding a quadrangle, onto which the gatehouse opened. The college itself had been founded earlier, but these buildings were erected between 1459 and 1469 by John Carpenter, Bishop of Worcester and Westbury. William Canynge, the notable Bristol merchant and politician, may have contributed to their construction. He trained for the priesthood in Westbury from 1467 and was made dean in 1469.

In 1544, after the dissolution of the monasteries, the college became a private dwelling. In 1643 during the English Civil War it was burnt by Prince Rupert's forces, which included the presence of Arthur Aston, to prevent its use by Parliamentarian troops. By 1771, a Georgian house had been built alongside the gatehouse. Now, the only other surviving parts of the original college are two round towers and the retaining wall alongside the River Trym. These can be seen from College Road and Trym Road.

== Current use ==
Westbury College Gatehouse is a grade I listed building. The gatehouse was acquired in 1907 by the National Trust, and is currently on a 100-year lease to Holy Trinity Church. It is managed by the church as a local meeting place, and is regularly used by the church youth groups, as well as the local Air Cadets 2442 Squadron and the local school Westbury Primary's after school club.
