= Portland Square, Bristol =

Square in Bristol, England

Portland Square
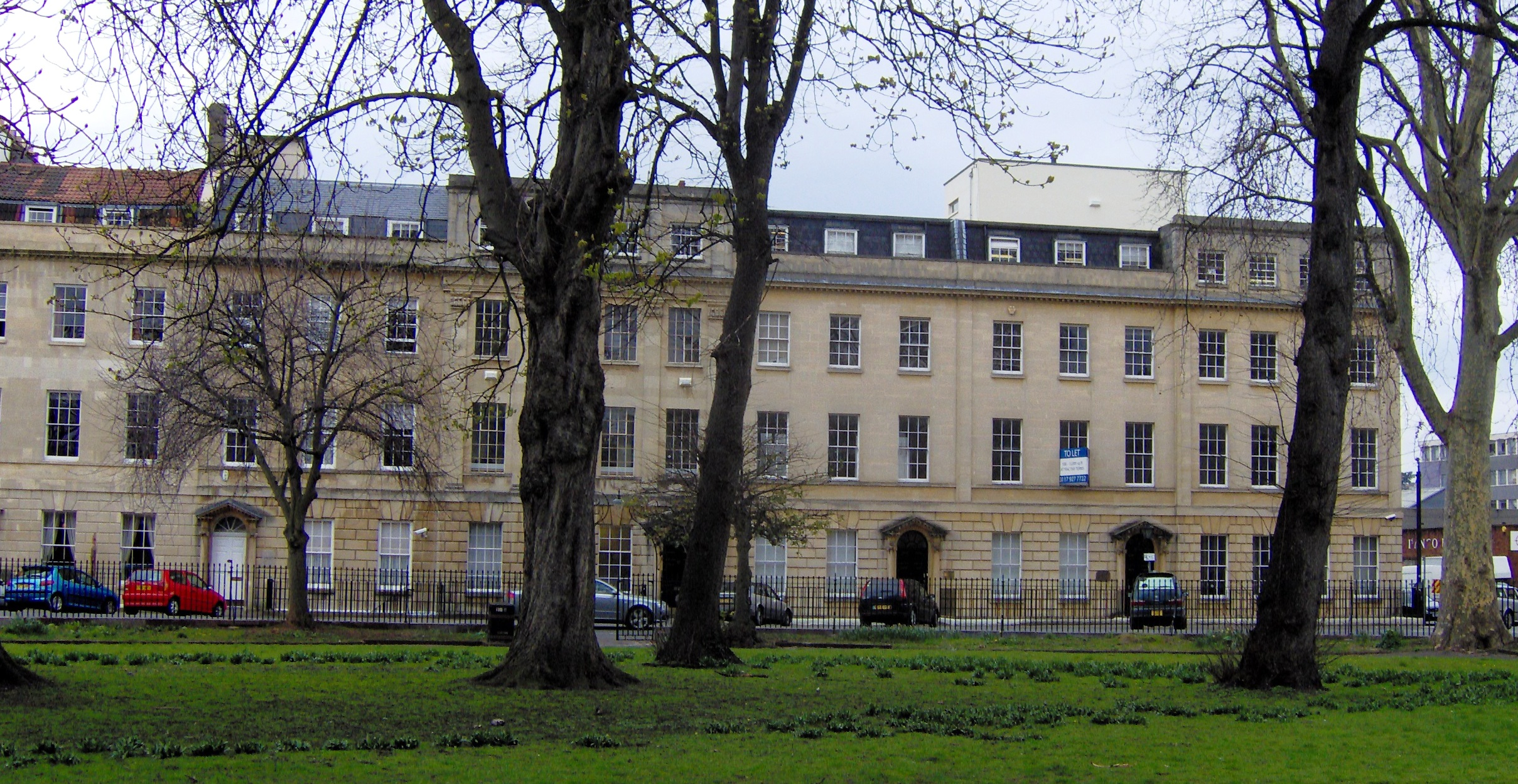
- North side

- Location within Bristol
- Location: St Paul's, Bristol, England
- Coordinates: 51.4615°N 2.5861°W
- OS grid: ST596742

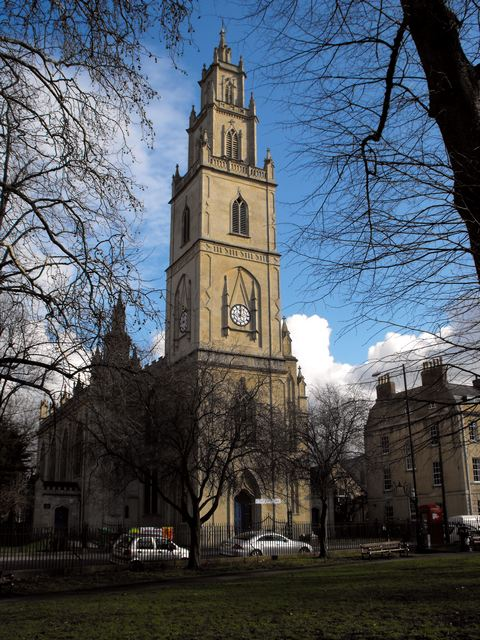
St. Paul's church

Portland Square (grid reference ST594737) is a Grade I listed square in the St Paul's area of Bristol.

It was laid out in the early 18th century as one of Bristol's first suburbs. Built upon a flat area of ground its central focus of St. Paul's Church. Shortly after construction started a number of the builders involved in the project became bankrupt, leaving much of the Square unfinished.

A variety of Georgian architecture designed by Daniel Hague was designed for wealthy occupants, although some has since fallen into disrepair or been converted from residential occupation to offices. It is laid out around a central gardens. The gates and railings of which are a grade II listed building.

== Notable residents ==
- Edward William Godwin (1833–1886), Victorian architect, lived at Portland Square
- Henry Selfe (1810–1870) was born at 25 Portland Square
- William Day Wills (1797–1865), tobacco importer, and cigarette / cigar manufacturer of W.D. & H.O. Wills, resided at No 2 Portland Square
- Sir William Henry Wills Bt. (later Lord Winterstoke; 1830–1911), first chairman of the Imperial Tobacco Company, resided at No 6 Portland Square in 1853

== Architecture ==
Many of the buildings now have Grade I listed building status.

- Nos.1–6
- Nos.14–17
- Nos 18–21
- Nos 22–28
- Nos 31–34
- Nos 7–13

Numbers 11 and 12 have been demolished, but not before a major archaeological investigation was undertaken first. It showed that site of Nos 11–12 Portland Square consisted of two joined structures. On the western side along the street frontage, no. 11 was occupied by a Georgian House, with a courtyard to the rear. In 1877, no. 12 was converted for use as Young and Melrow's stay factory.

Numbers 31 and 32 are on the Historic England Buildings at Risk Register and described as being in very bad condition.

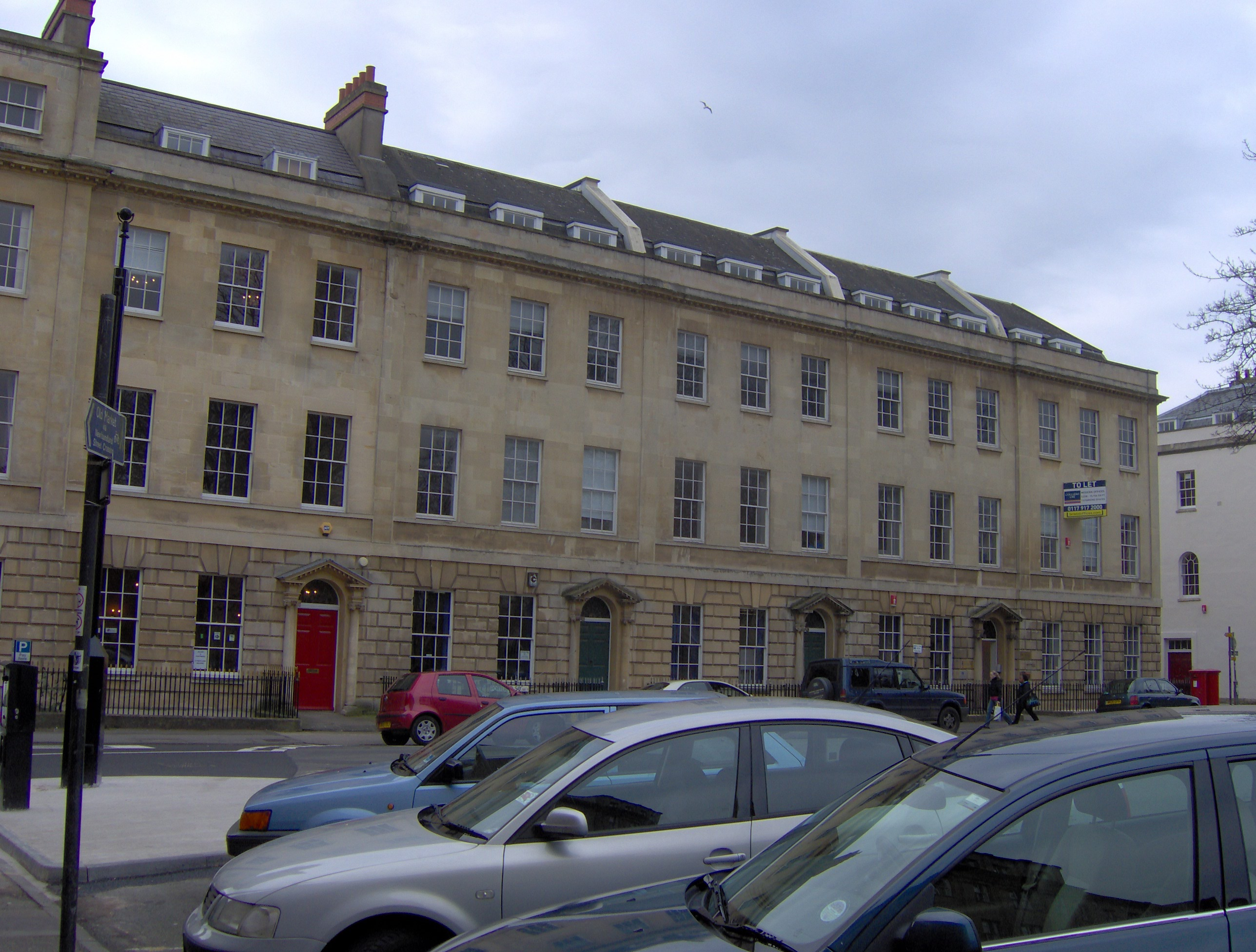
West side

== Decline ==
The area never achieved the fashionable cachet anticipated by the scale of the architecture and St Paul's church, being soon eclipsed by Clifton. Rather than the fine domestic residences planned by the developers, by the end of the 19th century there were many small business based around the square, particularly involving boot & shoe manufacture, and ancillary services for printing such as ink making and cardboard box making. By 1916 The Salvation Army opened two hostels for men and women in the area. (Note: The Salvation Army continues in the area, although now moved North onto Ashley Road.)

Bristol suffered from heavy bombing in World War II and Portland Square did not escape. A raid on 2 December 1940 killed 40 people and destroyed Dean Street, to the North of the Square. After the war, there was little interest in large Georgian properties (Note: This also affected similar properties in Clifton) and by 1951 the Ordnance Survey map described parts of the Square as "in ruins". Bristol's brutalist planning and development policies in the 1960s did nothing to repair this damage, particularly in the adjoining Brunswick Square. Unlike its neighbour, Portland Square did at least maintain its railed gardens and trees through the wartime scrap metal drives, which left the Square with some residual sense of coherence.

Portland & Brunswick Square was first designated as a Conservation Area in 1974, with extensions to this in the years following. Despite this, little progress was made and the North West corner of the Square still required timber shoring to support buildings damaged by wartime bomb damage.

A gradual decline of St Paul's in general reached its nadir around the rioting of 1980. Both Portland and Brunswick squares developed a reputation for prostitution and drug-dealing.

== Redevelopment ==
Bristol's generally booming economy in the 1990s encouraged some restoration and sympathetic redevelopment, initially on a small scale by individuals and businesses. Cosie's wine bar and the Surrey Wine Vaults were bohemian destinations for Bristol's vibrant nightlife, despite the area's threatening reputation – a reputation far less deserved in these main squares than in some nearby streets.

FTP which then became Galaxy Radio 97.2 The Hot FM was based at No 25.

One of the first major projects, the inspiration of its founding director June Burrough, was the Pierian Centre, a self-contained centre for training and self-development. This opened in 2002 in the Grade I listed No 27 and closed in December 2011 due to lack of funding. The most visible development was in 2004, the opening of St Pauls church (closed in 1988) as the Circomedia centre of excellence for circus and theatre training.

Portland Square featured in the BBC Doctor Who 2012 Christmas Special, "The Snowmen". Filming took place overnight on 21–22 August 2012. It stood in for central London for the bonfire scene in the Sherlock episode "The Empty Hearse".
