= Diamond Cottage =

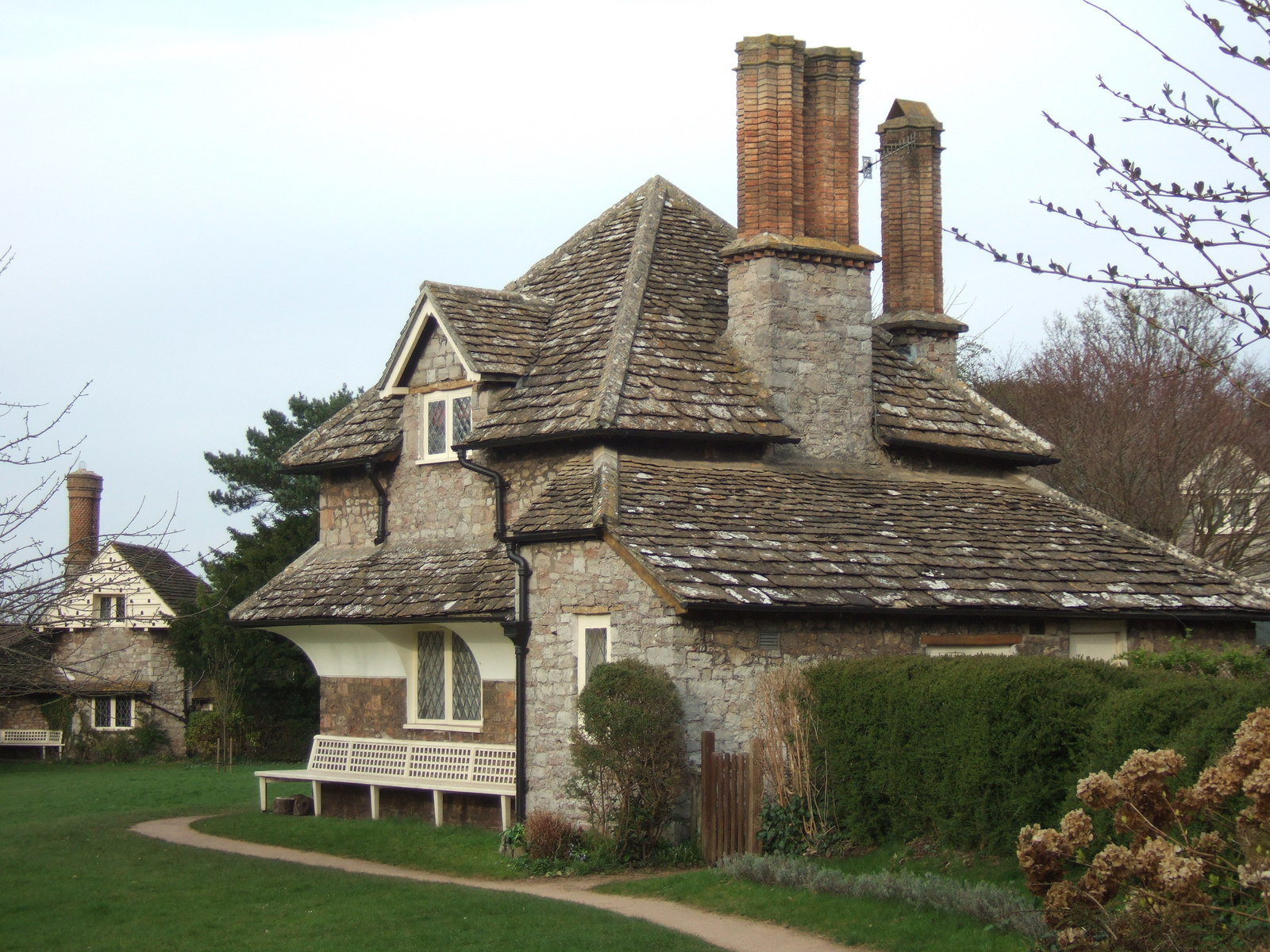
- View from the east

- Location within Bristol

General information
- Status: Occupied
- Type: Cottage
- Architectural style: Rustic
- Classification: Grade I listed
- Location: Blaise Hamlet, No.2 Blaise Hamlet, Bristol, England
- Coordinates: 51.507073°N 2.635479°W

Technical details
- Floor count: 2

Design and construction
- Architects: John Nash and George Stanley Repton

Diamond Cottage is a rustic cottage designed by John Nash (1752–1835) and George Stanley Repton (died 1858) in Blaise Hamlet, Bristol, England. The picturesque cottage is one of a group of ten built around 1810 as retirement homes for the servants of a wealthy banker.

== Location ==
The land on which the cottage stands is part of an estate purchased by John Scandrett Harford, a banker, for £13,000 in 1789. Harford had a substantial house built and asked the landscape architect Humphry Repton to lay out the grounds. Repton became a partner of John Nash, whom Harford commissioned to design a group of cottages as homes for his retired servants. Nash created sketches of the cottages, which George Repton built. The cottages surround an open green. Each cottage faces the green and has a separate back garden. They were described by Pevsner as "...the nec plus ultra of picturesque layout and design".

When built, the cottages would have been set in open country. Since then the group of cottages has been surrounded by a high wall, which hides the modern housing around them. The hamlet became a National Trust property in 1943. Diamond Cottage was made a listed building, grade I: buildings of exceptional interest, on 8 January 1959. It is listed as 901-1/20/1341, no. 2 Blaise Hamlet, Diamond Cottage on Hallen Road. The exterior has been carefully restored, while the interior has been modernised and is still occupied. The cottage is rented by the National Trust.

== Description ==
The picturesque style Diamond Cottage was built in 1812. It is faced with random rubble. The hipped roof is tiled in stone, and has two diagonally-set brick chimney stacks to the rear. On two sides there is a pent roof over a deep coved eave, with a leaded lattice casement in each wall. The cottage is entered from the left through a plank door in a porch with a pitched roof. Before renovation it had a kitchen, sitting room, scullery and outside lavatory. The attic with a half dormer is reached by a dogleg stairway. The cottage interior was modernised around 1975.

== Sources ==
- "Blaise Hamlet, Diamond Cottage, Bristol", BLB: British Listed Buildings
- Grade I Listed Buildings in Bristol, Bristol City Council
- Graeme (2016), "Blaise Hamlet", PBase
- The history of Blaise Hamlet, National Trust
