= College Green, Bristol =

Public open space in Bristol, England

College Green
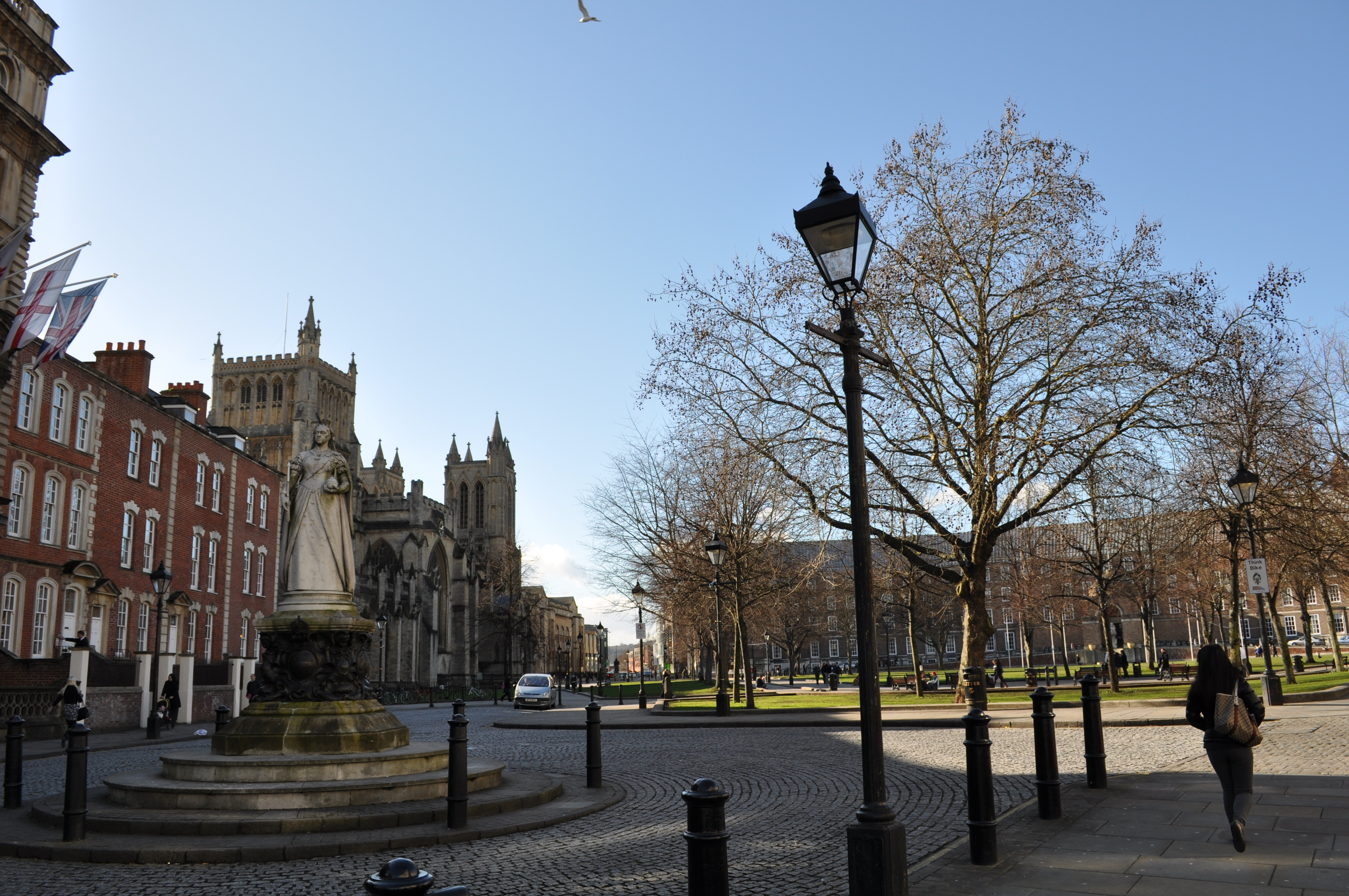
- College Green showing Queen Victoria statue, Cathedral and Council House

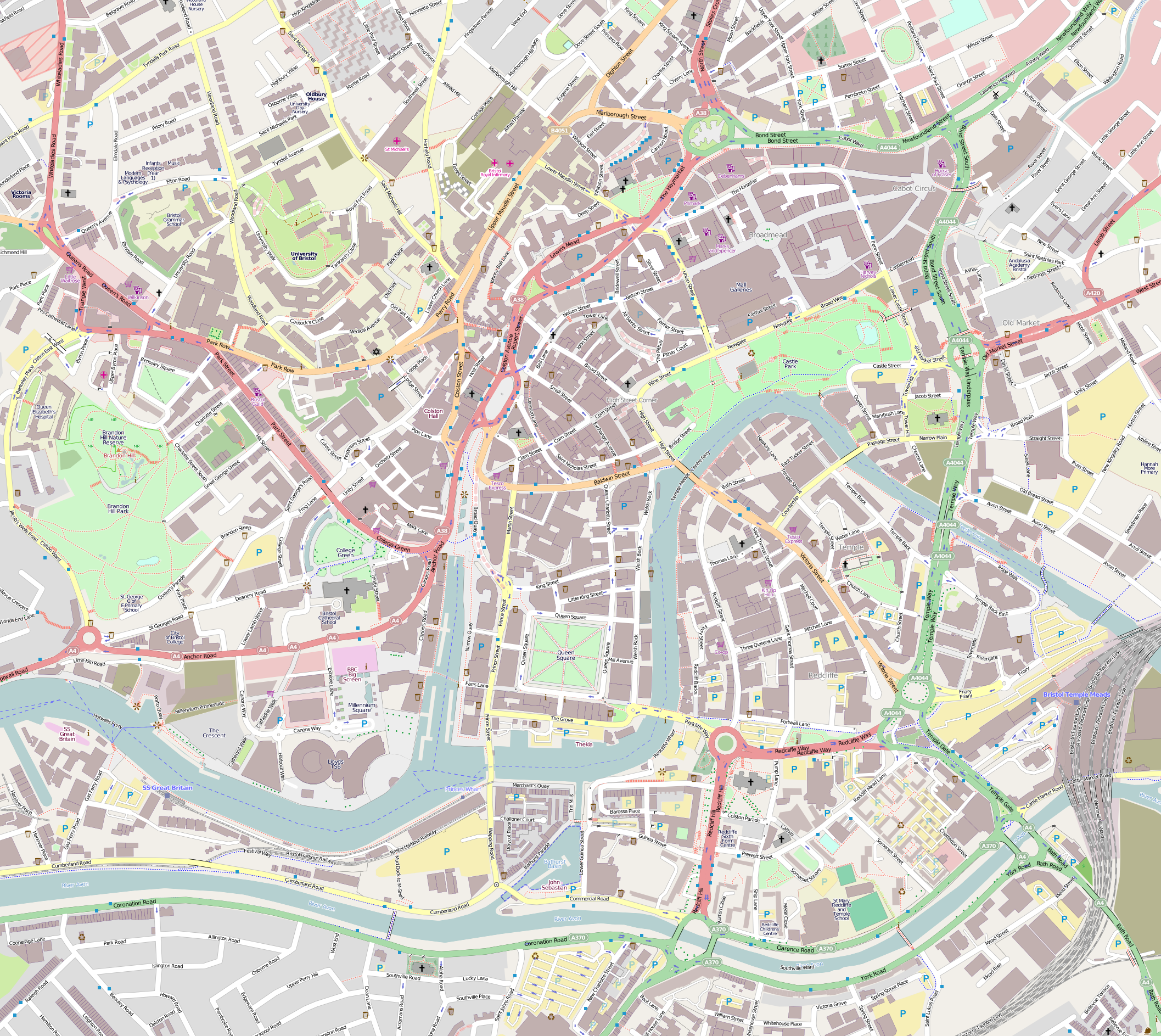
- Location within Bristol Central
- Interactive map of College Green
- Location: Bristol
- Coordinates: 51.4526°N 2.6015°W
- Area: 1.1 hectares (2.7 acres)
- Created: 12th century
- Operator: Dean and Chapter of Bristol Cathedral

College Green is a public open space in Bristol, England. The Green takes the form of a segment of a circle with its apex pointing east, and covers 1.1 hectares (2.7 acres). The road named College Green forms the north-eastern boundary of the Green, Bristol Cathedral marks the south side, and City Hall (formerly the Council House) closes the Green in an arc to the north-west.

College Green is owned by the Dean and Chapter of Bristol Cathedral, and managed by Bristol City Council.

== History ==
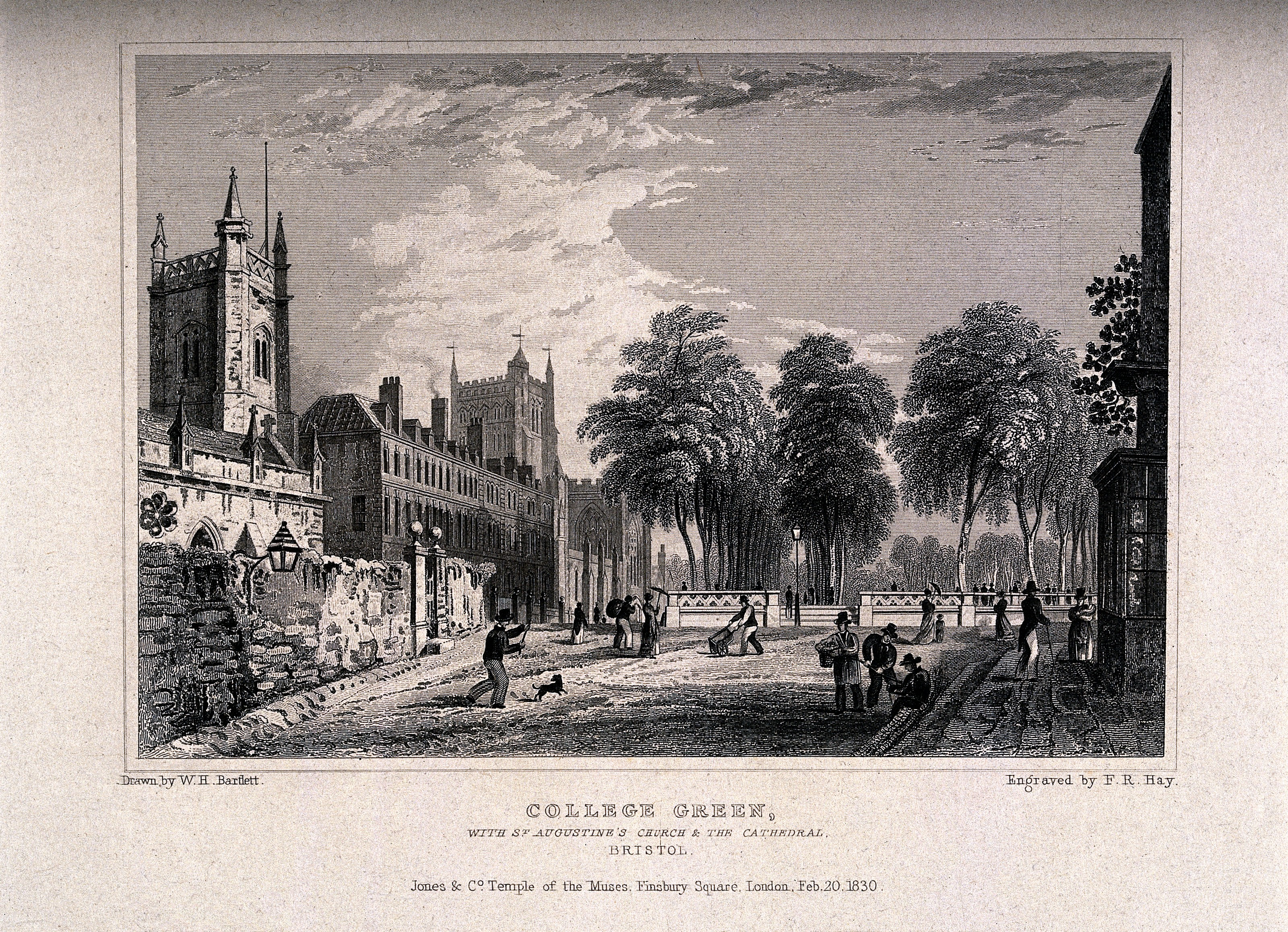
Line engraving of "Avenue leading to the College Green with St. Augustine's church and cathedral, Bristol" by Frederick Rudolph Hay from a drawing by W.H. Bartlett

Originally a small hill north of the River Avon separated from Brandon Hill to the north west by a narrow gully, College Green was enclosed to form the precincts of St Augustine's Abbey (now Bristol Cathedral) in the 12th century. After the Dissolution of the Monasteries, the abbey became a collegiate church and its precincts thenceforth became known as 'College Green'.

Before the English Reformation, a chapel named after a saint called Jordan stood on the green beside an open-air pulpit. A hymn found in a 15th-century book of hours in Bristol suggested Jordan's relics had been entombed in the chapel and were venerated there. After the Reformation, the building was used as a school, and it was finally destroyed in the early 18th century.

The Bristol High Cross was moved here from its original location at the junction of High, Wine, Broad and Corn Streets, where it had been considered a traffic hazard, in 1733. In 1762 the Green was levelled and laid out as a raised park with stone boundary walls, wooden railings and formal promenades crossing at its centre. The High Cross was removed and stored in the greater cloister of the cathedral, and in 1764 it was given to Henry Hoare for use as a garden ornament at Stourhead, where it can still be seen.

The name 'College Green' also applied to the road which passed on all three sides of the triangular Green. From 1869, the southern leg of this formed part of the new Deanery Road, being the main route out of Bristol heading to the south-west and separating the Green from the Cathedral, whilst the northern leg (from 1758) led down to a crossroads with Frog Lane and Frogmore Street and up Park Street towards Clifton. In 1851 a replica of the High Cross was erected and placed at the apex of the Green. This remained here until a statue of Queen Victoria (by Joseph Boehm) took its place in 1888, at which time the replica Cross was moved to the centre of the Green, at the intersection of the formal promenades where the original had stood between 1736 and 1762. For the next sixty years the Green remained a leafy oasis, insulated from the busy roads on either side by a double row of tall trees, though slightly diminished by the removal of the outer row of trees on the south side around 1885 and on the north side for road-widening in 1926.

In 1950 at the request of Vincent Harris, controversial architect of City Hall, all remaining trees, the formal promenades, railing, lamps, statue and High Cross were removed and the Green lowered some 4 feet 6 inches, around 75,000 tons of material being taken away. Harris stated that this "would 'make' my building", and considered the removal of the statue and High Cross "a minor detail". Wide new promenades were laid out running parallel to the sides of the Green, with low Portland stone borders.

After a period of storage at Redcliffe Wharf during which other locations were considered, and following a campaign for its return, the statue of Queen Victoria was returned to the apex on the Green in 1953. Part of the replica High Cross, vandalised in storage, is now preserved in Berkeley Square.

In 1991 the eastern end of Deanery Road was closed to motor traffic and grassed over for much of its length, reuniting the Cathedral with its Green as it had been before 1709. A short section of the eastern end of Deanery road was retained to give access to the Royal Hotel and numbers 4–7 College Green to the east of the Cathedral, re-laid with reclaimed setts. As part of this enhancement scheme, a circular seating area was laid out near the apex and reclaimed cast-iron lamp posts were installed.

== Sites of interest ==
College Green is surrounded by a number of historic and important public buildings, including City Hall, the Lord Mayor's Chapel, the Cathedral and the Abbey Gatehouse.

Queen Victoria's statue stands at the apex of the Green, and in the south-western corner near the Central Library is a statue of social reformer Raja Rammohun Roy.

== Events ==
College Green is a popular meeting place for young people, particularly street sports enthusiasts. This has led to tensions, and in 2007 a Group Dispersal Order was served on the area to allow the police to prevent groups of young people congregating.

With its proximity to City Hall, College Green is often the focus of protests against local or national government policy. On 15 October 2011, it became the site for Occupy Bristol, a camp established as part of the worldwide "Occupy" protests against social and economic inequality. Following the removal of the protesters, and after nearly two months and £20,000 of remedial work, the Green was re-opened on 4 April 2012.

College Green is a regular venue for media launches, press calls, charity fundraisers and product launches.

On 29 February 2020, a protest by Bristol Youth Strike 4 Climate attended by over 30,000, including Greta Thunberg, was held on the Green. Due to recent damp weather, the area became trampled into mud. An appeal for money to repair the damage quickly raised about £15,000 although, as it turned out, only minor interventions were needed to restore the grass. Some of the money was used in April 2021 to create a wildflower area near the cathedral, and the rest of the funds were passed to a local charity, the Bristol and Bath Parks Foundation, for use elsewhere in the city.

== Gallery ==
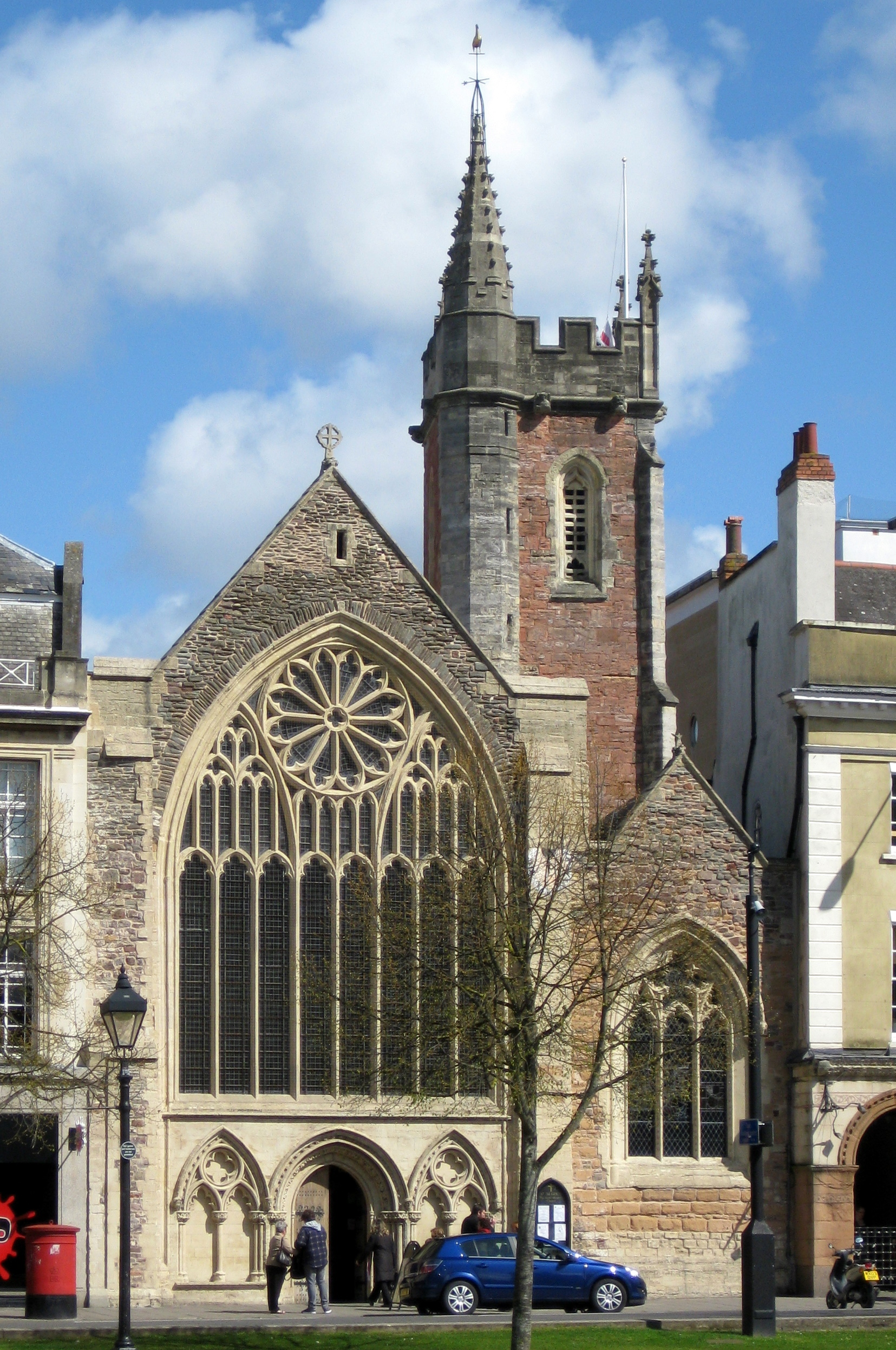
St Mark's Church

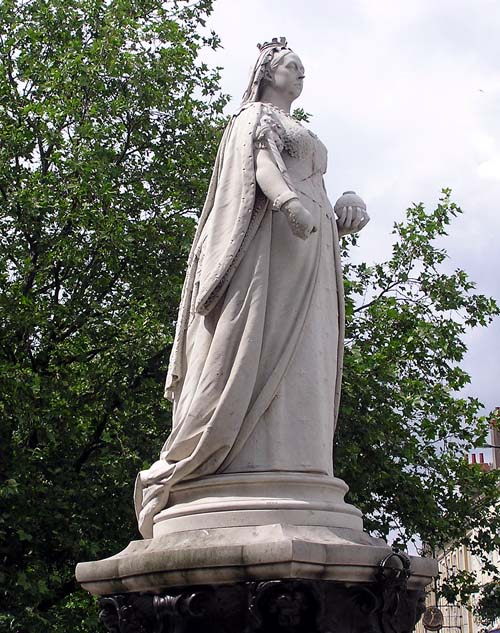
Queen Victoria Statue

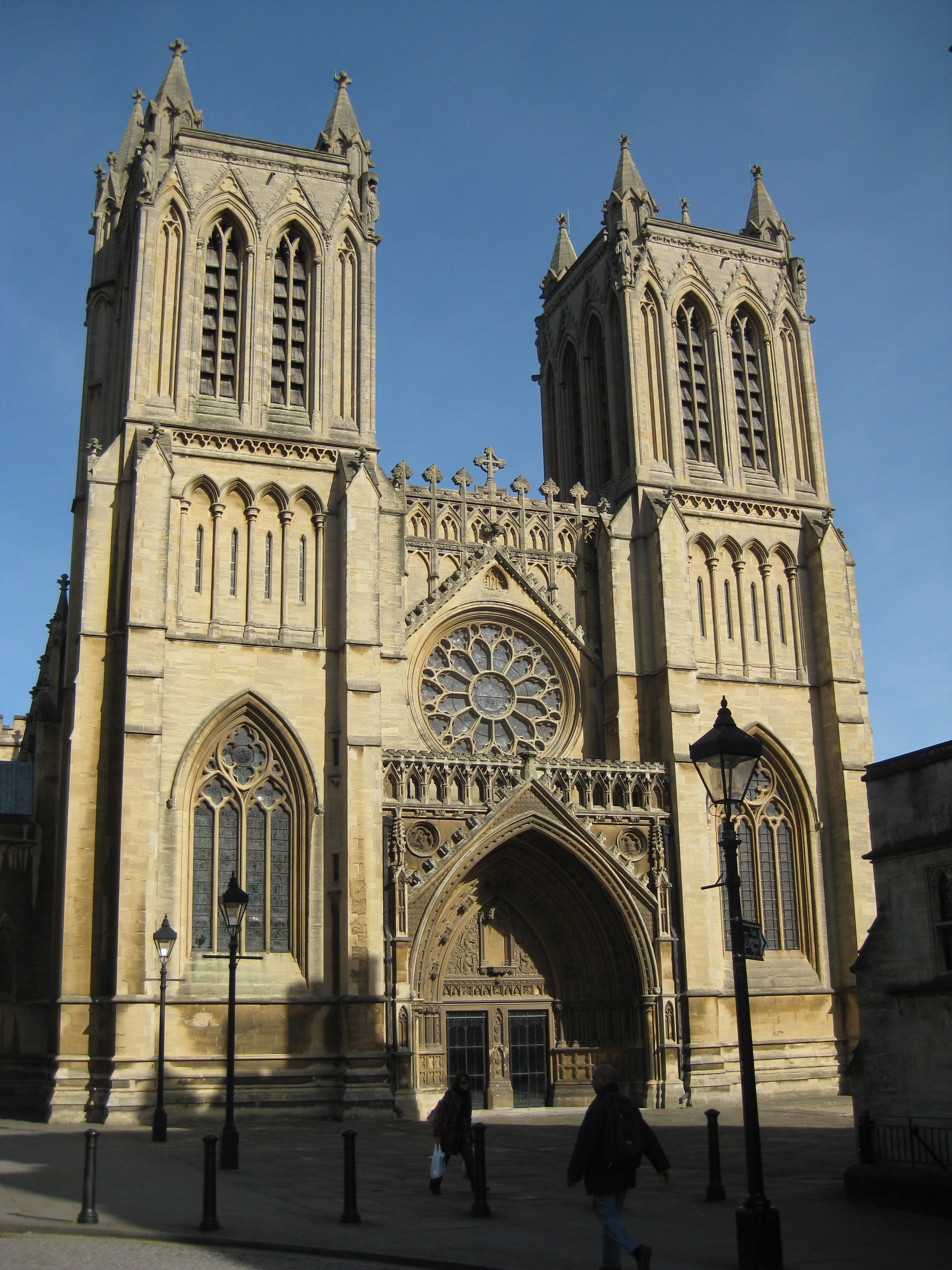
Bristol Cathedral

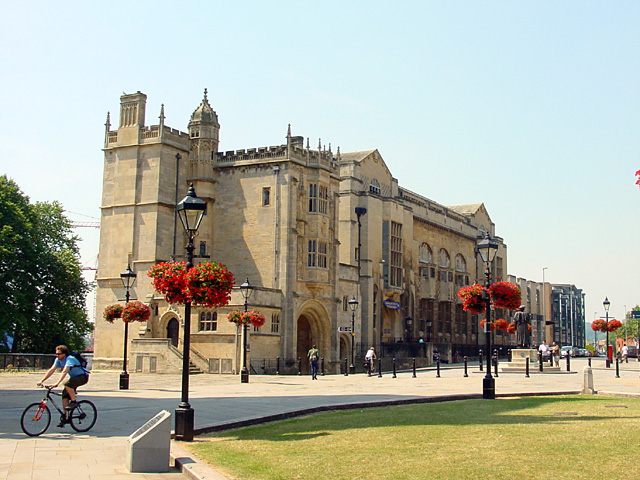
Bristol Central Library

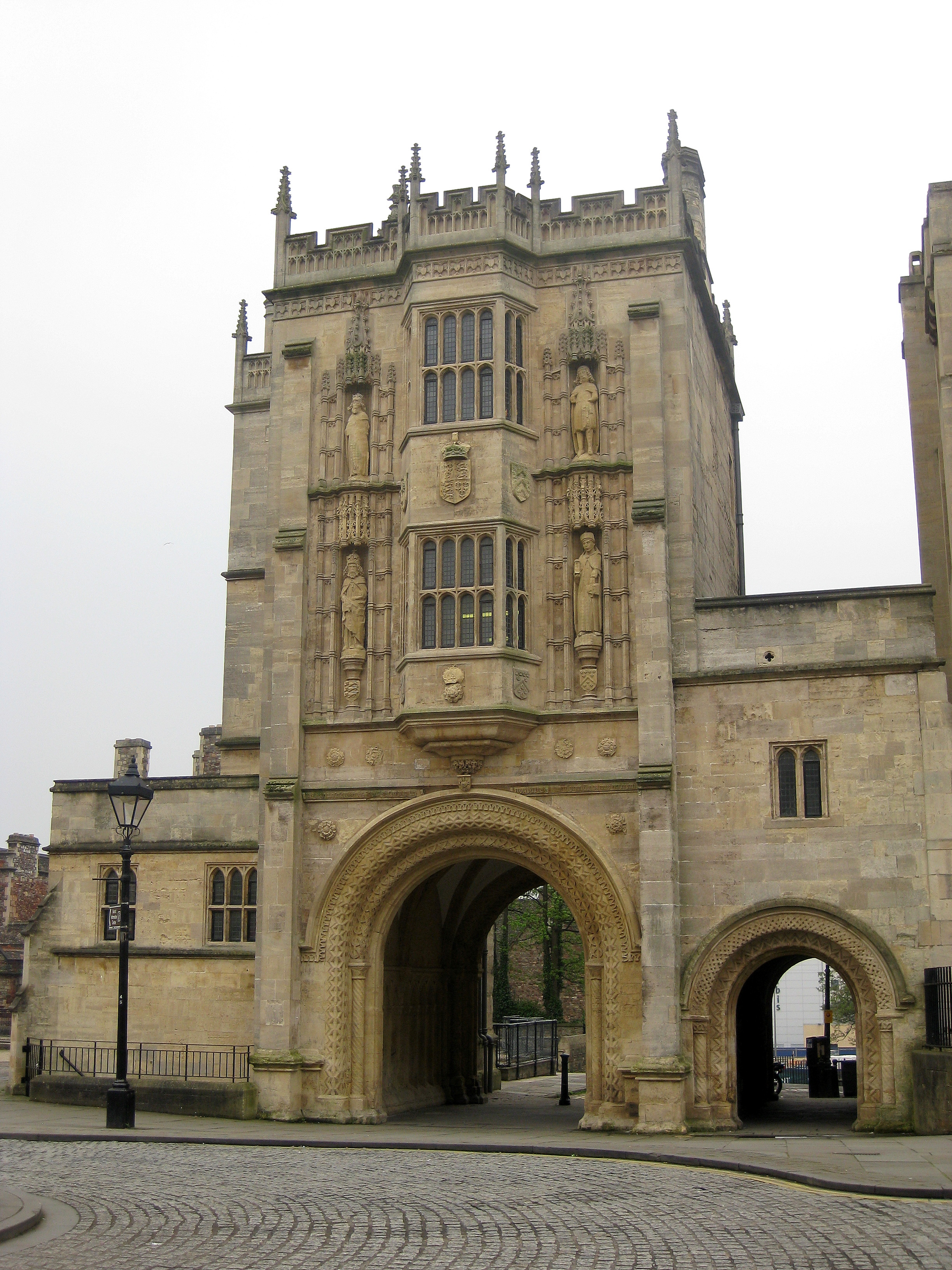
The Great Gatehouse

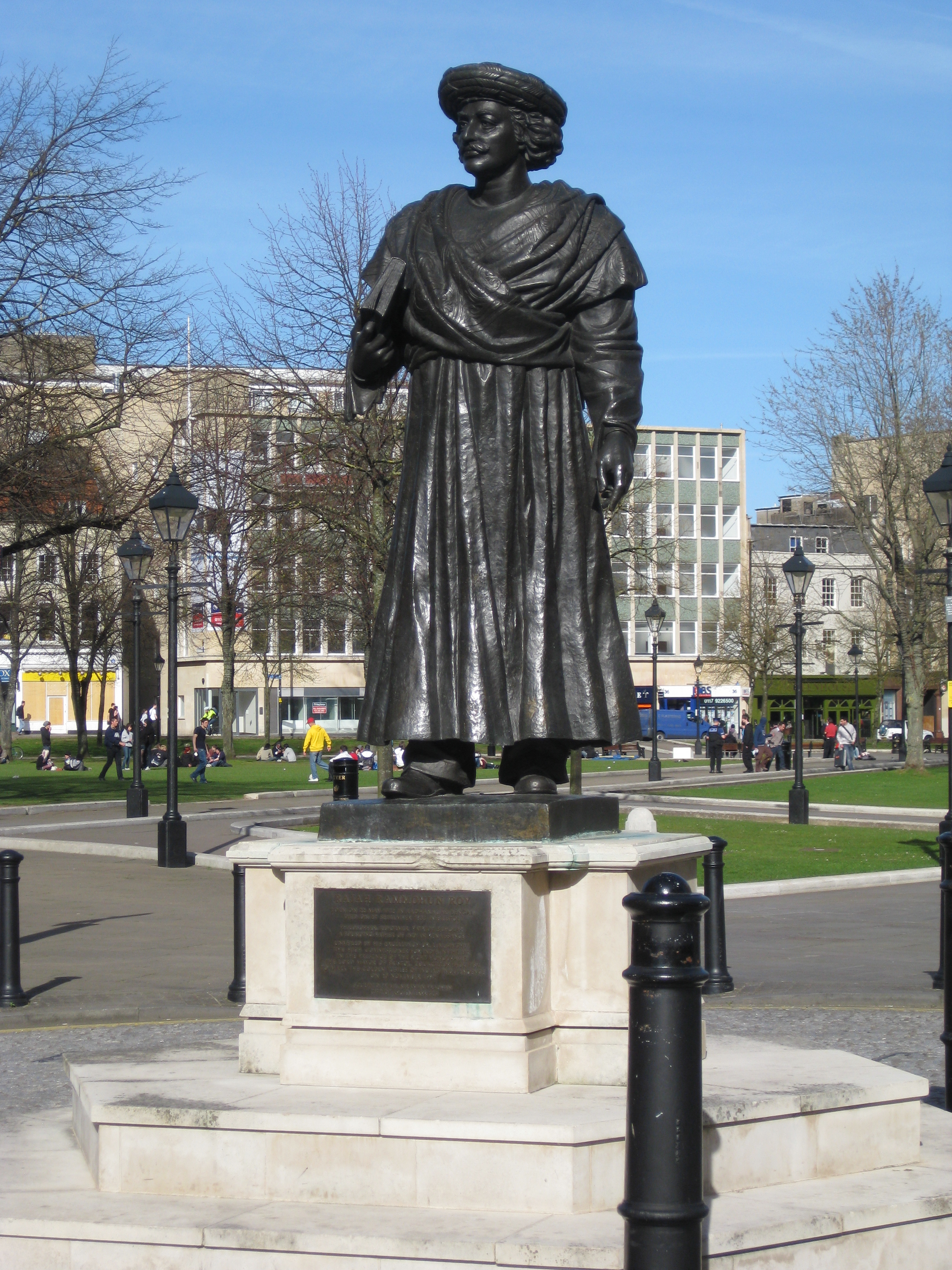
Statue of Ram Mohan Roy

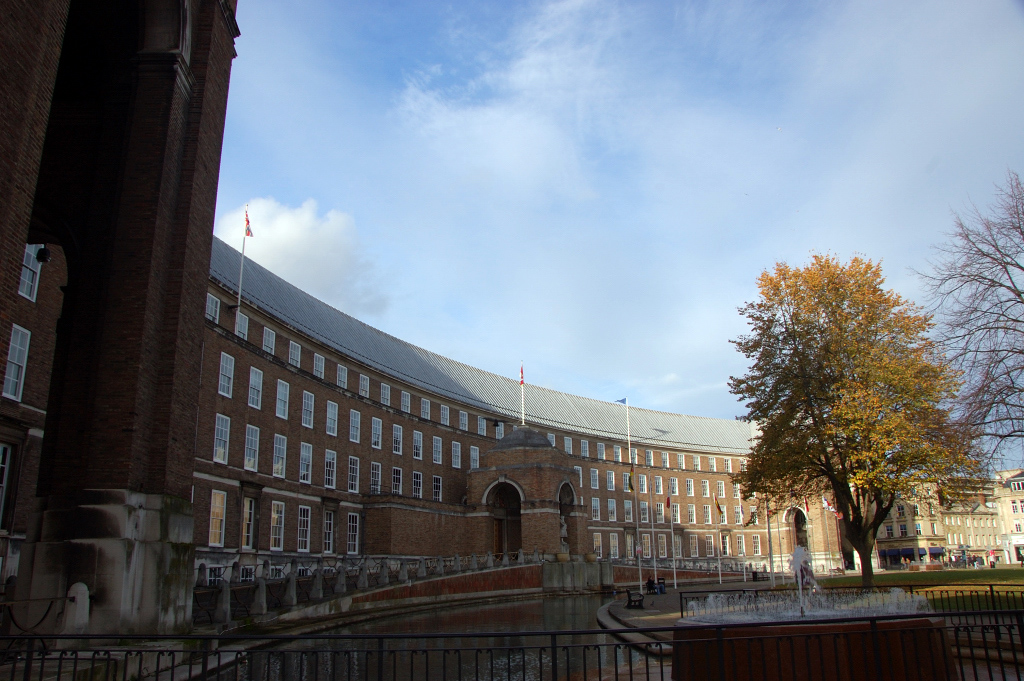
City Hall

== In popular culture ==
The Green was a filming location for scenes for the 2007–2013 E4 drama series Skins, and the 2008 BBC Three comedy-drama Being Human.

College Green is mentioned in "Wash Away", a song by Bristol-based band Coasts from their 2016 debut album 'Coasts'.

== See also ==
- Parks of Bristol
- List of public art in Bristol
