= Blaise Hamlet =

Grade I listed hamlet in Bristol, England

Coordinates: 51.507218°N 2.635608°W

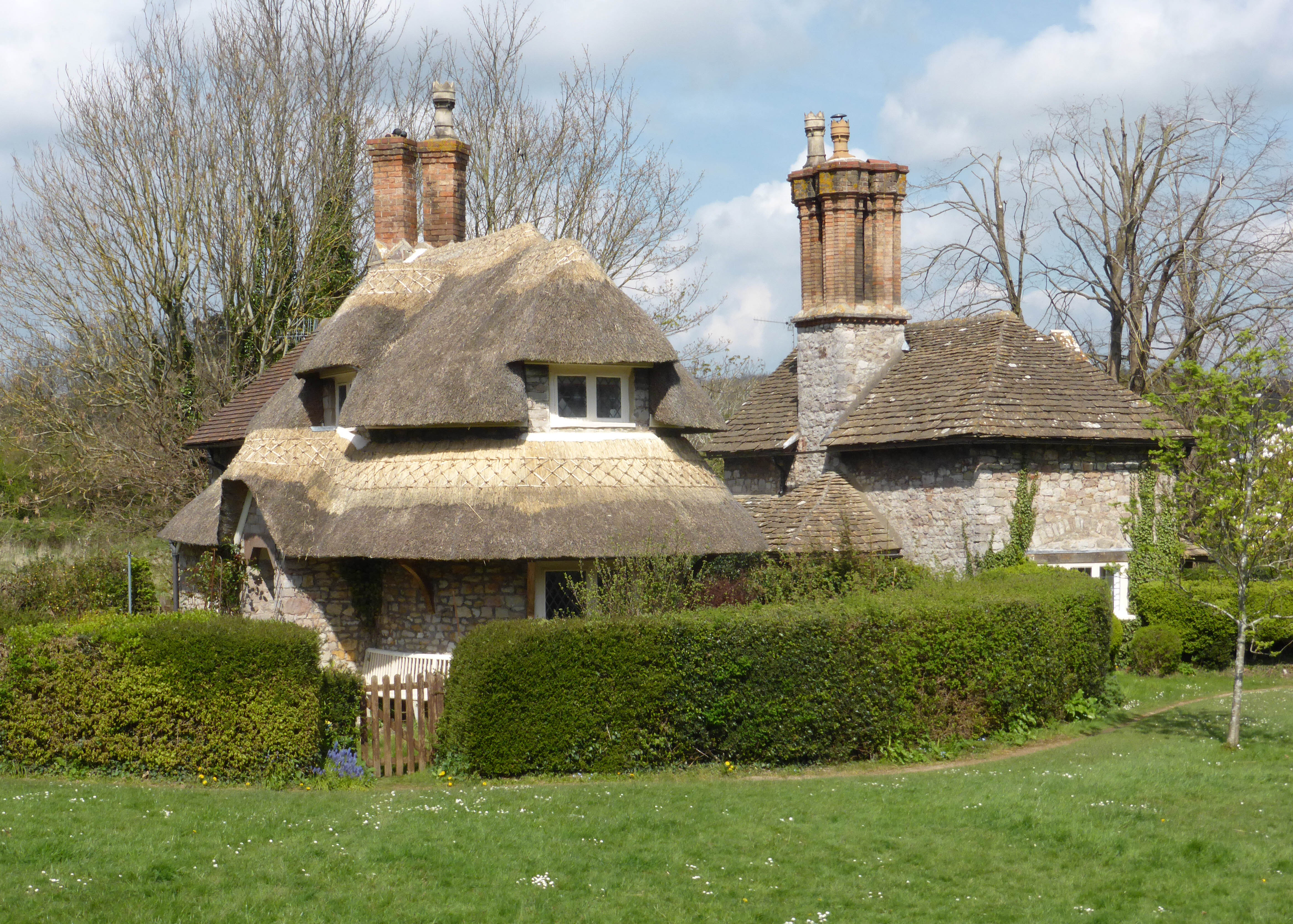
- Circular Cottage (left), with Sweetbriar Cottage immediately beyond

- Location within Bristol
- OS grid reference: ST555785
- Unitary authority: Bristol
- Region: South West
- Country: England
- Sovereign state: United Kingdom
- Post town: BRISTOL
- Postcode district: BS10
- Dialling code: 0117
- Police: Avon and Somerset
- Fire: Avon
- Ambulance: South Western
- UK Parliament: Bristol North West

Blaise Hamlet is a group of nine small cottages around a green in Henbury, now a district in the north of Bristol, England. All the cottages, and the sundial on the green, are Grade I listed buildings. Along with Blaise Castle, the hamlet is listed, Grade II*, on the Register of Historic Parks and Gardens of special historic interest in England. Nikolaus Pevsner described Blaise Hamlet as "the ne plus ultra of picturesque layout and design".

Blaise Hamlet was built around 1811 for retired employees of Quaker banker and philanthropist John Scandrett Harford, who owned Blaise Castle House.

The hamlet was designed by John Nash, master of the Picturesque style, who had worked for Harford on other buildings. The hamlet is the first fully realised exemplar of the garden suburb and laid a pattern for virtually all garden suburbs that followed. The cottages are each unique and have brick chimneys and dormer windows, with some having thatched roofs. They are examples of the Picturesque style, an aesthetic ideal introduced into English cultural debate in 1782 by William Gilpin. An oval path links the cottages and encircles the village green, where there is a sundial. The cottage gardens are planted in a Victorian cottage garden style.

Since 1943, the cottages have been owned by the National Trust. They are occupied and not open to the public, but the ensemble may be viewed from the green.

== Buildings ==
Building	House number	Grade	Photo	Reference
Circular Cottage	8	I		
Dial Cottage	7	I		
Diamond Cottage	2	I		
Double Cottage	4 and 5	I		
Dutch Cottage	3	I		
Oak Cottage	1	I		
Rose Cottage	6	I		
Sweetbriar Cottage	9	I		
Vine Cottage	10	I		

== See also ==
- Storybook house
