= Castle Park, Bristol =

Public open space in Bristol, England

Castle Park
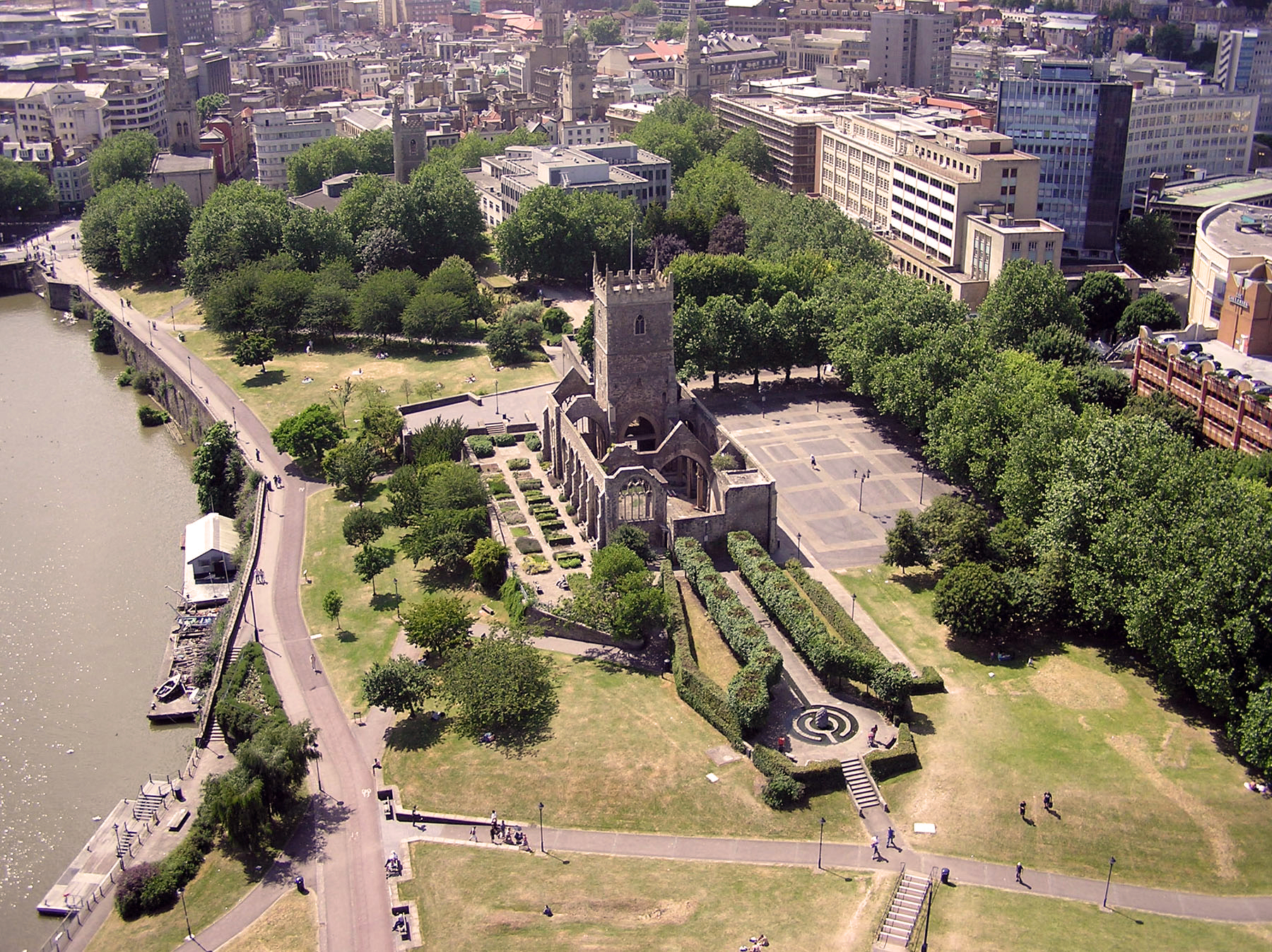
- Western part of Castle Park, with ruined St Peter's Church, garden and square in centre and Bristol Bridge in top left

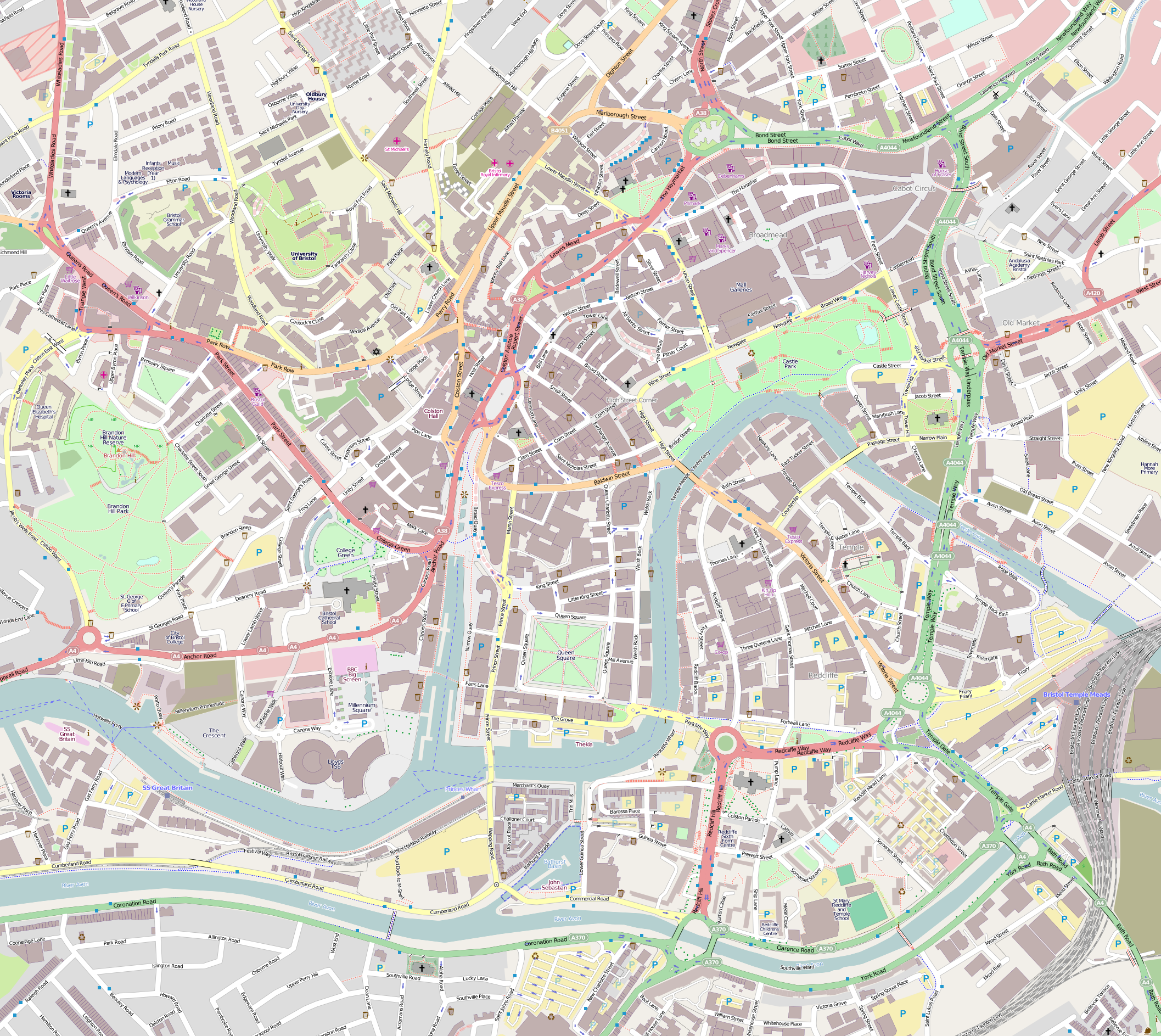
- Location within Bristol Central
- OS grid: ST592731
- Coordinates: 51.4558°N 2.5881°W
- Created: 1977
- Operator: Bristol City Council

Castle Park (sometimes referred to as Castle Green) is a public open space in Bristol, England, managed by Bristol City Council. It is bounded by the Floating Harbour and Castle Street to the south, Lower Castle Street to the east, and Broad Weir, Newgate and Wine Street to the north. Its western boundary is less obviously defined and has been the subject of controversy, perhaps because the area around High Street and St Mary le Port Church, though not part of the park and always intended for development, is often considered at the same time as the park.

Opened on 30 September 1978, the park occupies the site of what was once Bristol's main shopping district. The area was largely destroyed by the Luftwaffe during the Blitz, and that which remained was subsequently demolished by 1969, the last demolitions being the Bear & Ragged Staff and the Cat and Wheel pubs in Little Peter Street. In the years since the end of the Second World War, Castle Park has become home to a number of anti-fascist memorials.

The ruined 14th-century tower of St Mary-le-Port Church stands to the west of the park, surrounded by derelict financial office buildings. Adjoining the ruins of St Peter's Church in the middle of the park is a sensory herb garden on the site of the former St Peters Churchyard cleared 1965, and five silver birch trees as a memorial to the beaches of the D-Day landings. To the east is a grassy arena covering Castle Green and the west half of Castle Street, and the partially excavated remains of the great stone keep Bristol Castle with 2 preserved vaulted chambers formerly in Castle Green (Tower Street) farther east. There is also a bandstand.

Tree-lined St Peter's Square, to the north of St Peter's Church, (formerly Dolphin Street, Peter Street and Church or Chequer Lane) has been home to various events including German Christmas markets. In recent summers a tethered balloon was placed near the bandstand, offering ascents to sightseers.

Recent attempts to develop the area between the park's western edge and High Street have proved controversial; Bristol City Council are keen to replace the derelict 1963/4 buildings with a mixed-use development to help reconnect the Old City to Broadmead and raise funds to improve the park; others would rather see the park extended to High Street.

== History ==
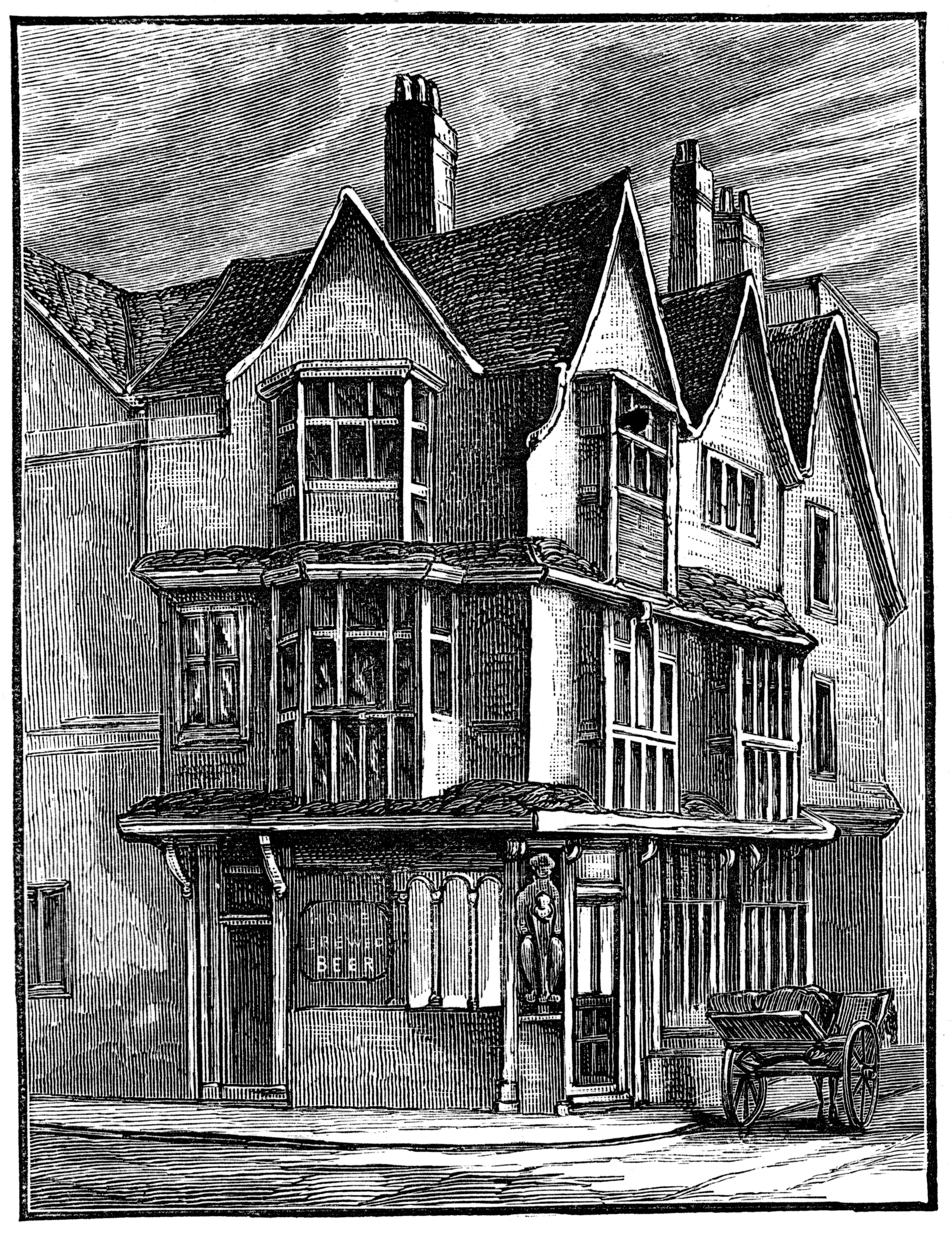
Cat and Wheel Tavern, corner of Castle Green and Peter Street, in about 1888

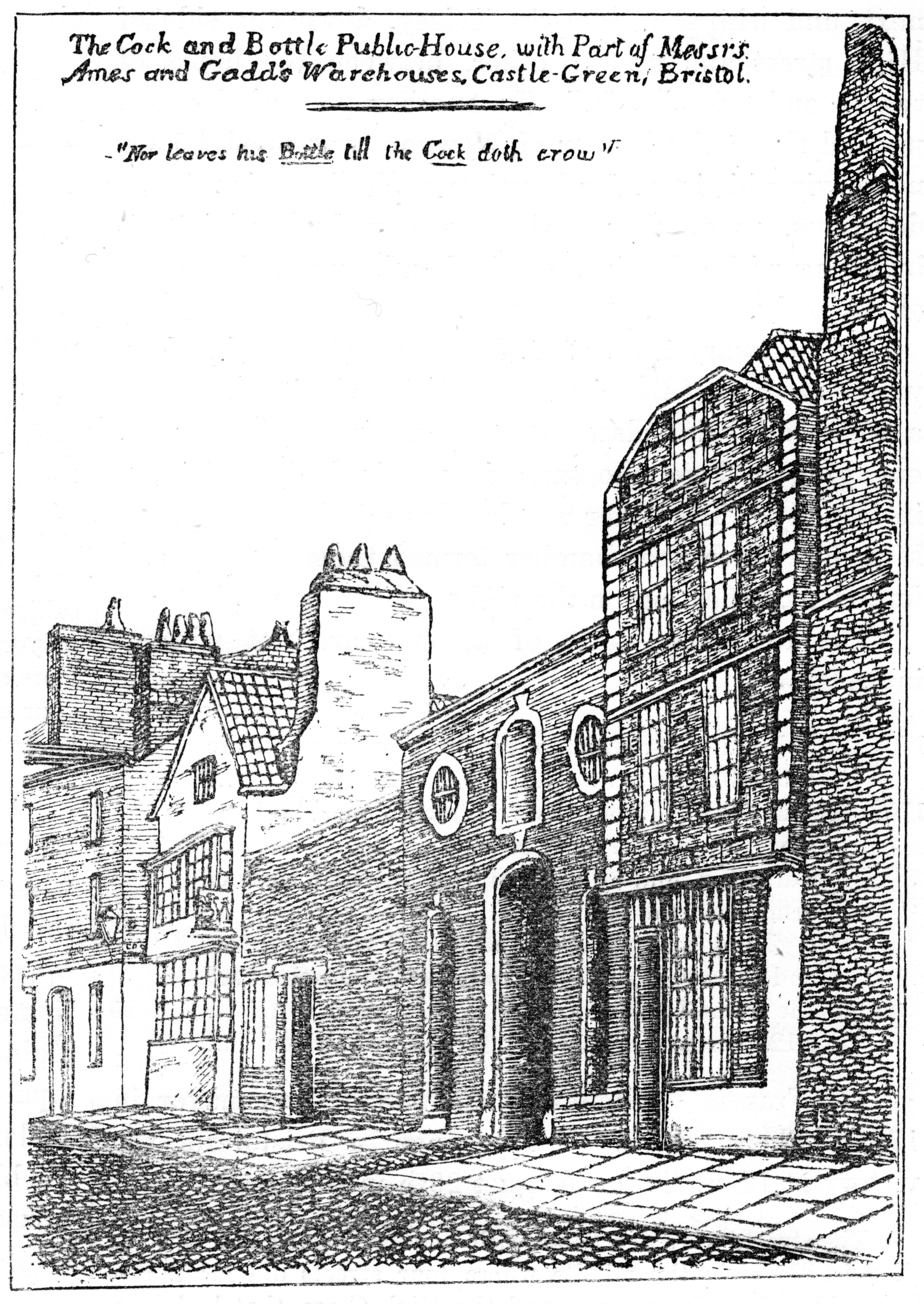
Cock and Bottle Lane seen from Castle Green in the late 19th century

The town of Bristol was settled at some time in the Anglo-Saxon period on the northern or Mercian side of a crossing point of the River Avon, at or near to the present Bristol Bridge. The town lay entirely between the Avon and the Frome, which at that time emerged into the Avon just downstream of Bristol Bridge.

Archaeological excavations of the area in 1962-1963 suggest that the original settlement was centred to the east of St Peter's Church, with Mary-le-Port on its western limit. The building of Bristol Castle in the latter part of the 11th century resulted in the focus of the settlement being moved to the west, where it developed into a symmetrical plan centred on the crossroads of High Street, Wine Street, Broad Street and Corn Street. The area around Mary-le-Port Street was thus the most ancient part of the medieval city. Bristol Castle was home to the Norman garrison, and was a massive structure whose keep was comparable to that of the Tower of London. The castle occupied the whole of the eastern end of today's Castle park, from just east of St Peter's Church to Lower Castle Street.

In 1612 Robert Aldworth, Mayor of Bristol, rebuilt St Peter's Hospital on a site between St Peter's Church and the Floating Harbour. It became the Bristol Mint in 1695, and was considered to be Bristol's greatest architectural loss of the Second World War.

By the 16th century the castle was falling into ruin, and following his victory in the English Civil War Oliver Cromwell decreed its destruction in 1655, a process which was completed within a fortnight. The castle had stood on the main route from Bristol to London, and following its destruction a commercial avenue opened along Castle Street from the mediaeval city towards Old Market. The demolition of Lawford's Gate at the eastern end of Old Market Street extended this into West Street, creating an uninterrupted route into the bustling heart of Bristol.

Wine Street and Castle Street became the main shopping streets, where retailers such as Boots, Jones's (later to become part of the Debenhams group), the Co-op and Marks & Spencer traded. Baker Baker had large stores in Bridge Street, Wine Street and Mary le Port Street; two of these were connected by a high bridge across Mary-le-Port Street. The area also hosted a cinema (the News Theatre) and its narrow winding back-streets contained many independent shops, hotels, and pubs. At the corner of High Street and Wine Street stood the 'most loved fragment of Old Bristol': The Dutch House.

=== Bombing of 24 November 1940 ===
On the afternoon of 24 November 1940, 148 aircraft of the Luftwaffe left airfields in Northern France heading for Bristol. The concentration point was to be the City Docks, and their objective was to destroy Bristol's industry and port facilities. 135 aircraft reached the target area, and dropped 156,250 kg (344,470 lb) of high explosives, 4,750 kg (10,470 lb) of oil bombs and 12,500 incendiaries. As the raid progressed, the fires could be seen from 250 kilometres (160 mi) away. Wide areas of the city were struck, but the most concentrated damage occurred in the area between Broad Quay and Old Market where fierce fires burnt through the night. By the morning, 200 Bristolians were dead and 689 injured, four Luftwaffe crewmen were dead, one injured and four captured, two aircraft were lost, and a large part of the historic heart of Bristol was a smouldering ruin.

The destruction was not total, however. Post-war photographs show that out of around 500 buildings some 80 survived intact, High Street, Castle Street and Peter Street. The west end of Narrow Wine Street, a 'fantastic little old thoroughfare', was more or less intact; Castle Mill Street and Castle Green received little damage, and Upper, Middle and Lower Terrace survived. More importantly, the irreplaceable mediaeval street plan remained.

=== Replanning ===
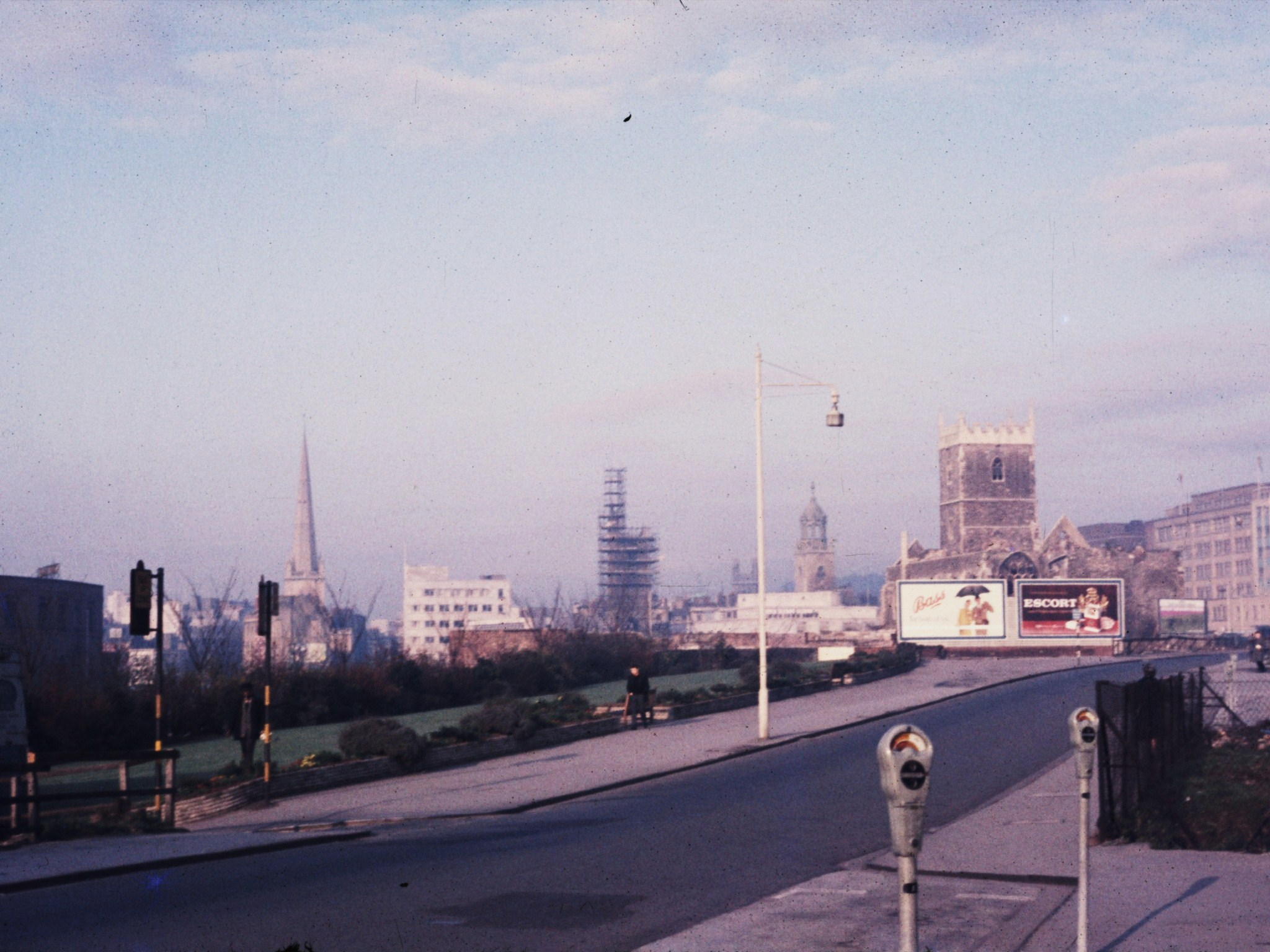
Castle Street under heavy reconstruction in 1963

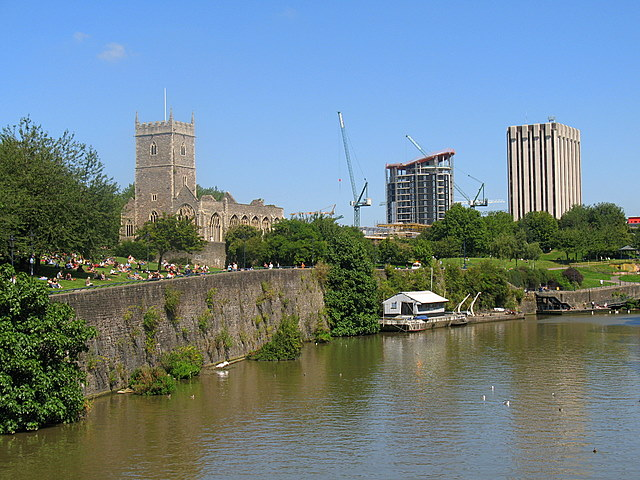
Redevelopment around Castle Green and Broadmead, viewed from the River Avon

The idea that Bristol's main shopping area should be moved away from the Castle Street and Wine Street area was first proposed to Bristol Corporation's Planning and Reconstruction Committee by the Multiple Traders' Federation (MTF), representing the larger retailers and chain-stores, in October 1943. They suggested that the pre-war shopping area should be set aside as a civic area with perhaps a concert hall or similar building and an open space, and that the central shopping area should be moved to a less-constrained site. This suggestion formed part of the City Engineer's Master Plan of February 1944, which envisaged that the area would contain a limited number of buildings such as a conference hall, with underground parking for 2,000 cars. The removal of the shopping area was considered desirable because the fire that had destroyed so much of the area was in large part sustained by its congested nature, and in any case many of the chain-stores represented by the MTF wanted larger sites.

The main objection to this plan came from the independent traders who did not wish to relocate because they felt that the proposed new shopping area was 'off the beaten track'. This objection was not unreasonable, as in its pre-war topography Bristol had a long shopping axis that started at Stapleton Road to the east, passed through Old Market into Castle Street, Wine Street, and the City Markets, and then via The Centre and Park Street to Queens Road and Whiteladies Road. Moving the central shopping area would break this axis. There was also concern about the serious negative social and economic impacts of 'sterilising' such a large area in the centre of the city. However, when the Bristol Retail Traders Federation, representing the small traders, produced a poll showing that 13,000 people wished to retain the shopping centre on its current site whereas only 400 preferred to see it moved, the local Labour party dismissed the poll describing it as 'undemocratic' and comparing the Federation's methods to those of Hitler.

By 1966, the shops had been rebuilt in 'barren' Broadmead (at the expense of demolishing an area of Victorian, Georgian and Tudor buildings that had escaped the wartime bombing more or less unscathed), and the Wine Street and Castle Street area was being used for car parking. The picturesque area around Narrow Wine Street and Castle Mill Street had been demolished to create modern Newgate, and Old Market, severed from Bristol's shopping axis by the new Temple Way Underpass and the destruction of Castle Street, was in serious decline. The plan for Castle Park was crystallising, however. The ruined St Peter's Church would be surrounded by a museum and an art gallery; to the east of this there would be an arts centre and the remaining area east to Lower Castle Street would be a park. The south-western corner nearest Bristol Bridge would contain a riverside hotel, and the north-western corner would be home to 'a block for cultural, professional and exhibition purposes'.

In the event, the north-western corner was leased to the Bank of England and Norwich Union Insurance (whose offices now stand derelict), and the critical corner site where the Dutch House had stood was replaced by a link road to a short section of dual-carriageway linking High Street with Wine Street. Plans for a civic centre were dropped as being too expensive.

Finally, in 1977, work began on an emasculated version of the new park. This was designed by Bristol City Council's parks department and, largely for financial reasons, it contained few of the features intended by earlier plans but was much larger than that originally planned. The last remaining vestiges of the mediaeval street plan, Dolphin Street and Peter Street, were buried.

=== Mary-le-Port development ===
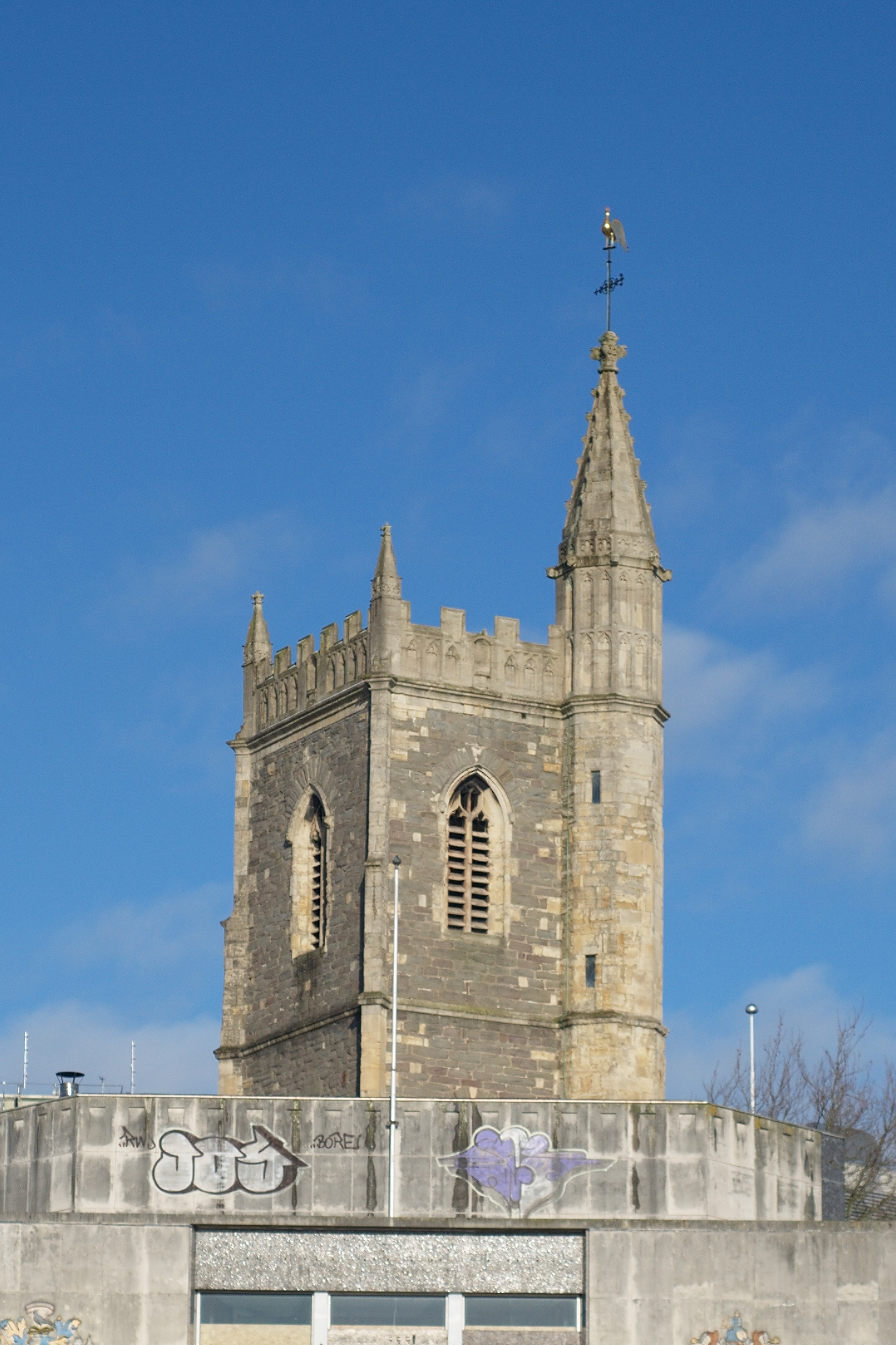
St Mary-le-Port church, surrounded by dereliction

In 2006, Bristol City Council announced its intention to redevelop the area to the west of Castle Park, known as the 'Mary-le-Port' site. These plans encompassed the by then derelict financial buildings, and the area to the west of St Peter's Church, about 5% of the park. It was to be a 400,000 square feet (37,000 m^{2}) mixed-use development to 'regenerate this historic heart of Bristol' and to 'improve connections between Broadmead, the Old City and Redcliffe' and 'enhance the setting of St Mary-le-Port church'. The council selected Deeley Freed as its preferred developer. The scheme provoked opposition from park users who felt that any reduction in the area of the park was not acceptable. 'Surprised by the extent of feeling', Bristol City Council decided to revise the plans. Campaigners then applied to have 'Town Green' status applied to the park, but this was declined in 2009.

In 2010, the Mary-le-Port site was listed as being 'for sale' by Bristol City Council.

=== Castle Bridge ===
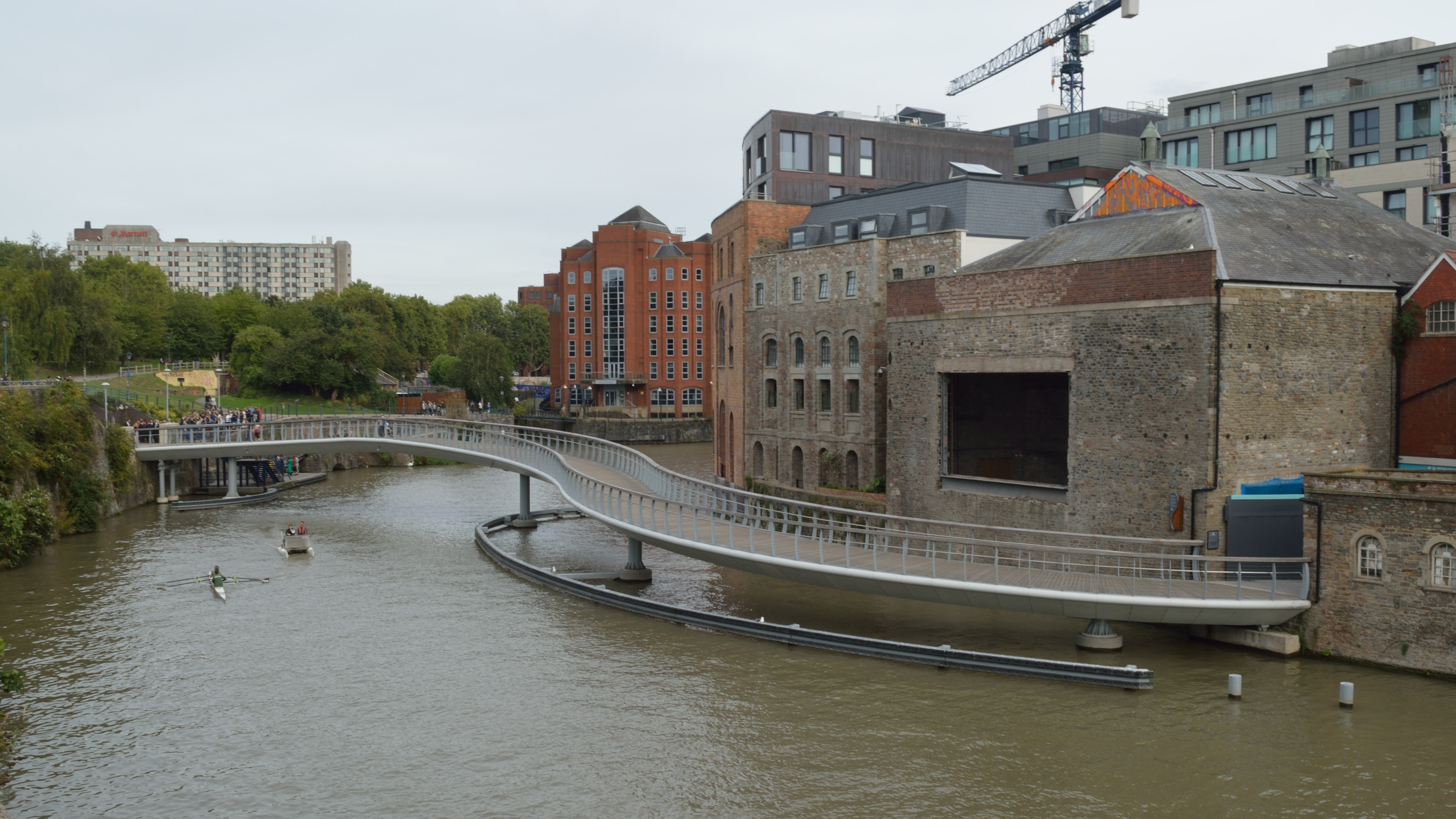
Castle Bridge

In March 2016, Bristol City Council approved plans for an S-shaped footbridge over the Floating Harbour, linking the park to the Finzels Reach development. The bridge cost £2.7 million and was opened on 6 April 2017.

== Sites of interest ==
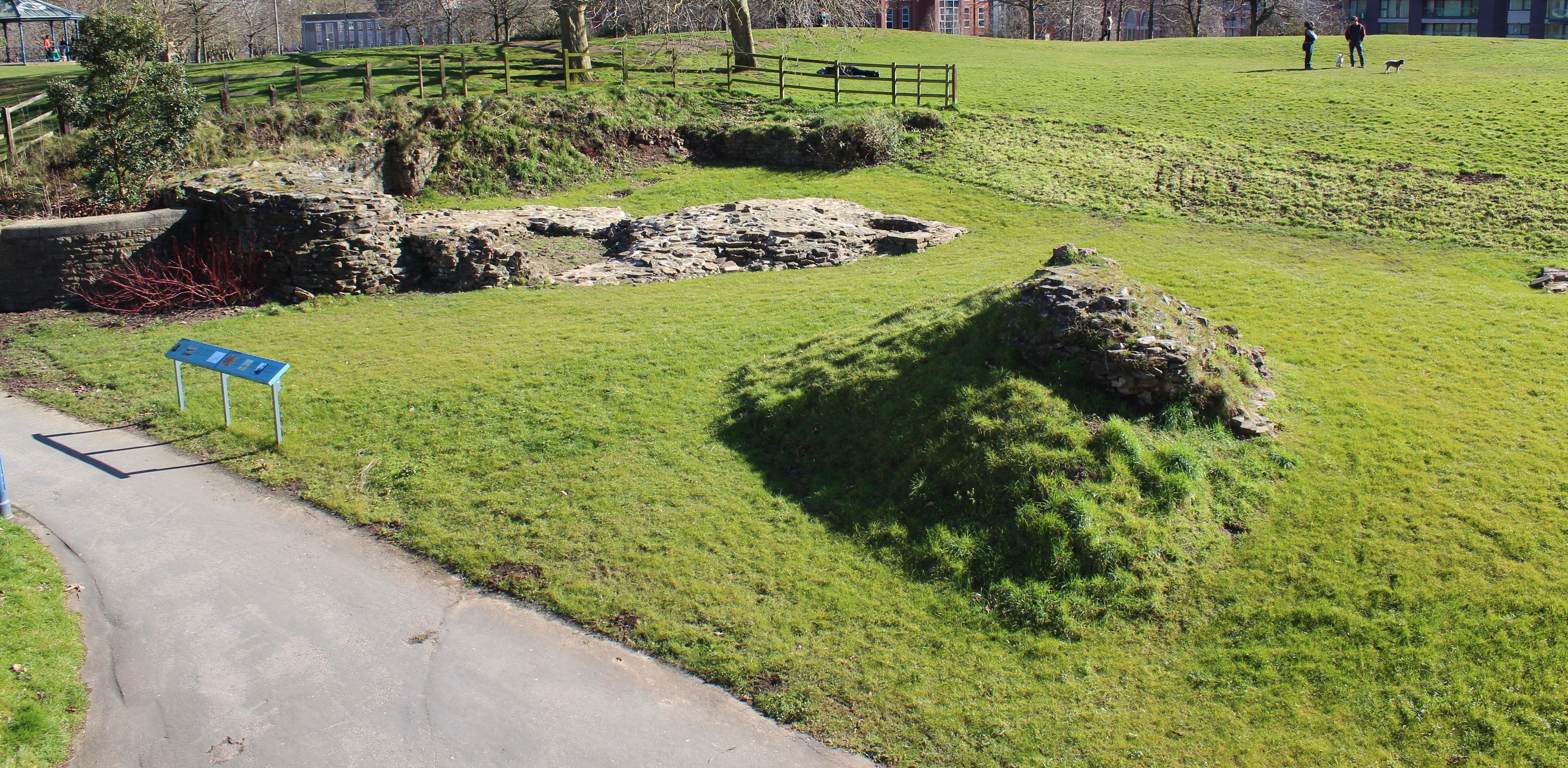
The remains of Bristol Castle, landscaped in 2018 to allow public access

Very little of Bristol Castle remains above ground. The most tangible survival is a vaulted chamber of the King's Hall, formerly on Tower Street near the now-truncated Castle Street. Other than that, the excavated remains of the south wall can be seen near the landing stage, and near St Peter's Church the sally port and traces of the west wall are visible. The foundations of the keep are on show next to the public toilets on Newgate.

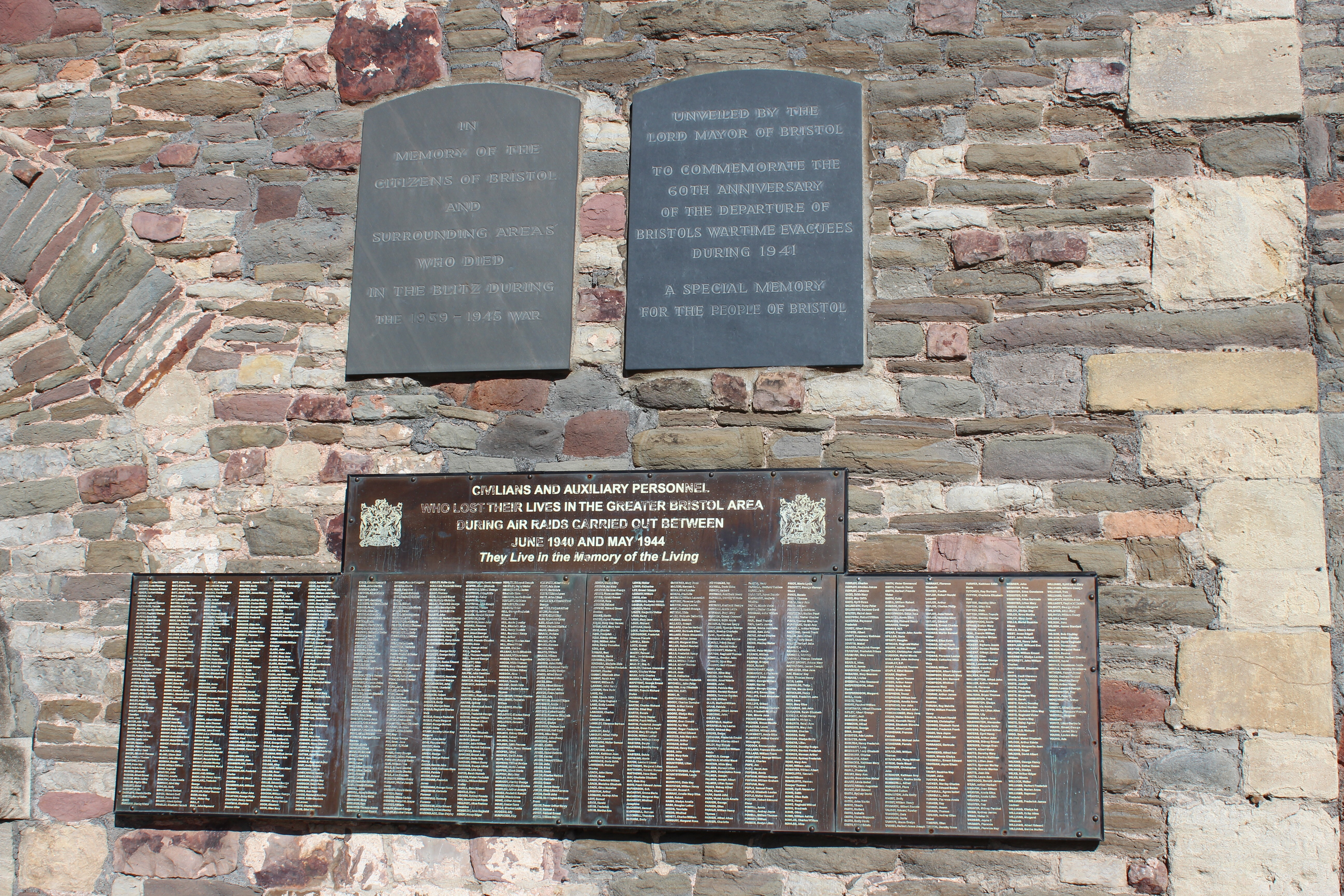
Memorials to Bristolians killed during the Blitz on St Peter's Church

The park contains a number of memorials. The ruins of St Peter's Church are a memorial to the civilians and auxiliary personnel killed in the aerial bombing of Bristol, and a plaque on its wall lists their names. Adjoining the church is a sensory herb garden and the Normandy Garden of Peace, which was opened on 5 November 1995, with five Silver Birch trees, managed by Bristol's D-Day veterans, in memory of the five D-Day beaches. There are also memorial trees for Anne Frank and the victims of the atomic bombings of Hiroshima and Nagasaki.

The park also contains a memorial plaque dedicated to citizens from Bristol who died fighting against the Nationalist forces during the Spanish Civil War, framed by a mosaic composed of the colours of the flag of the Second Spanish Republic.

The ruined tower of St Mary-le-Port church, subject of a painting by John Piper that appeared on a 1968 1s. 6d. postage stamp, stands on the western edge of the park, surrounded by now-derelict buildings.

== Listed buildings ==
Castle Park contains a number of listed buildings and scheduled monuments:

| Grid ref | Grade | Year listed | Description |
|---|---|---|---|
| ST 58992 73026 | Scheduled monument | 1949 (amended 2009) | St Mary-le-Port Church |
| ST 58980 73017 | II | 1959 | Tower of church of St Mary-le-Port |
| ST 59104 73117 | Scheduled monument | | Medieval vaults N of St Peter's Church |
| ST 59122 73096 | II* | 1959 (amended 1995) | Church of St Peter, Castle Park |
| ST59220 73158 | II | 1959 (amended 1995) | Castle keep remains |
| ST59354 73230 | II | 1959 | Castle wall remains |
| ST 59373 73129 | Scheduled monument | | Bristol Castle vaulted chambers |
| ST 59372 73128 | II | | Vaulted chambers at Bristol Castle |
