= Mary le Port Street, Bristol =

Former street in Bristol, England

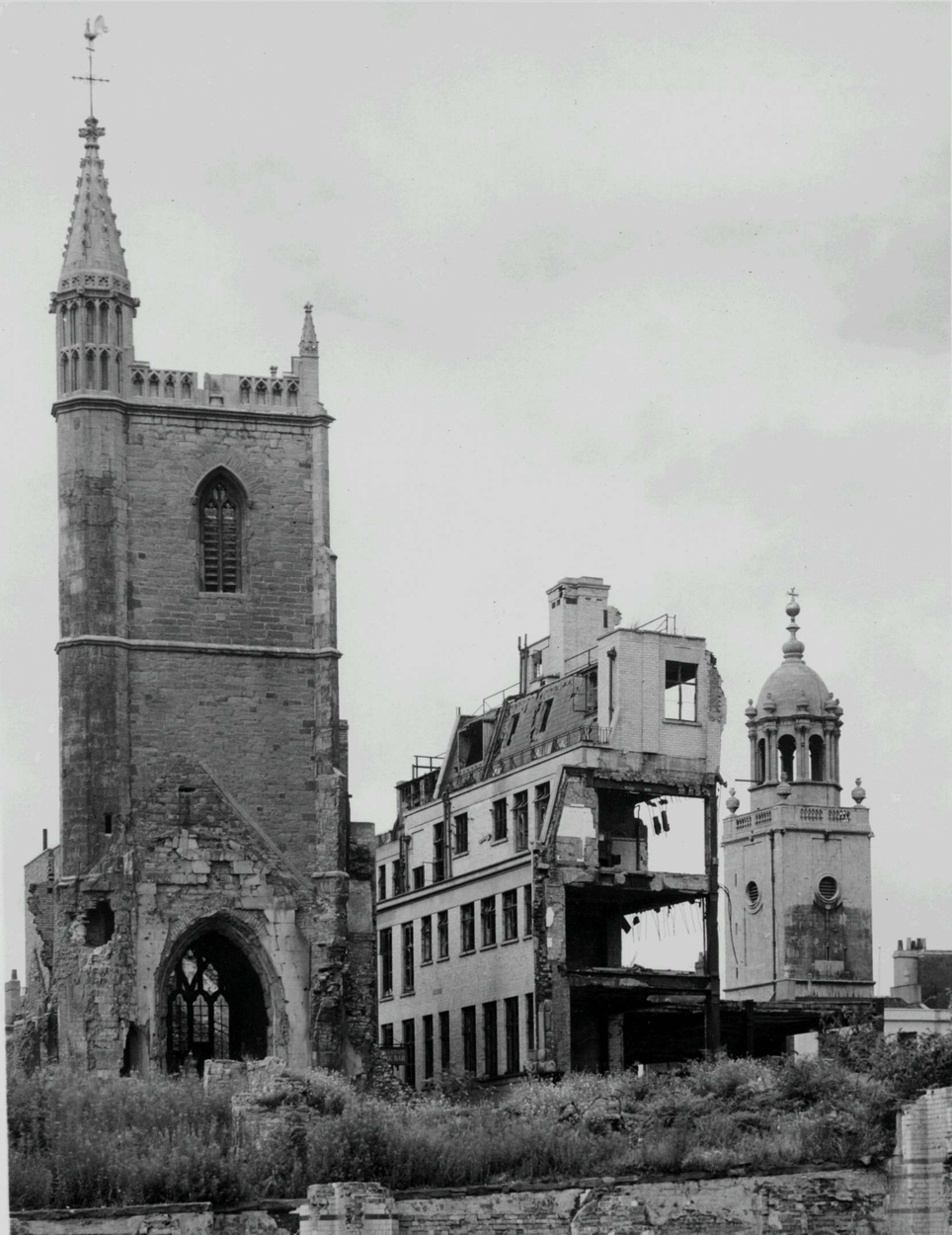
- Mary le Port Street after the 24 November 1940 bombing raid, showing the remains of the church from the south east. Other bombed buildings and the tower of All Saints' Church are also visible.

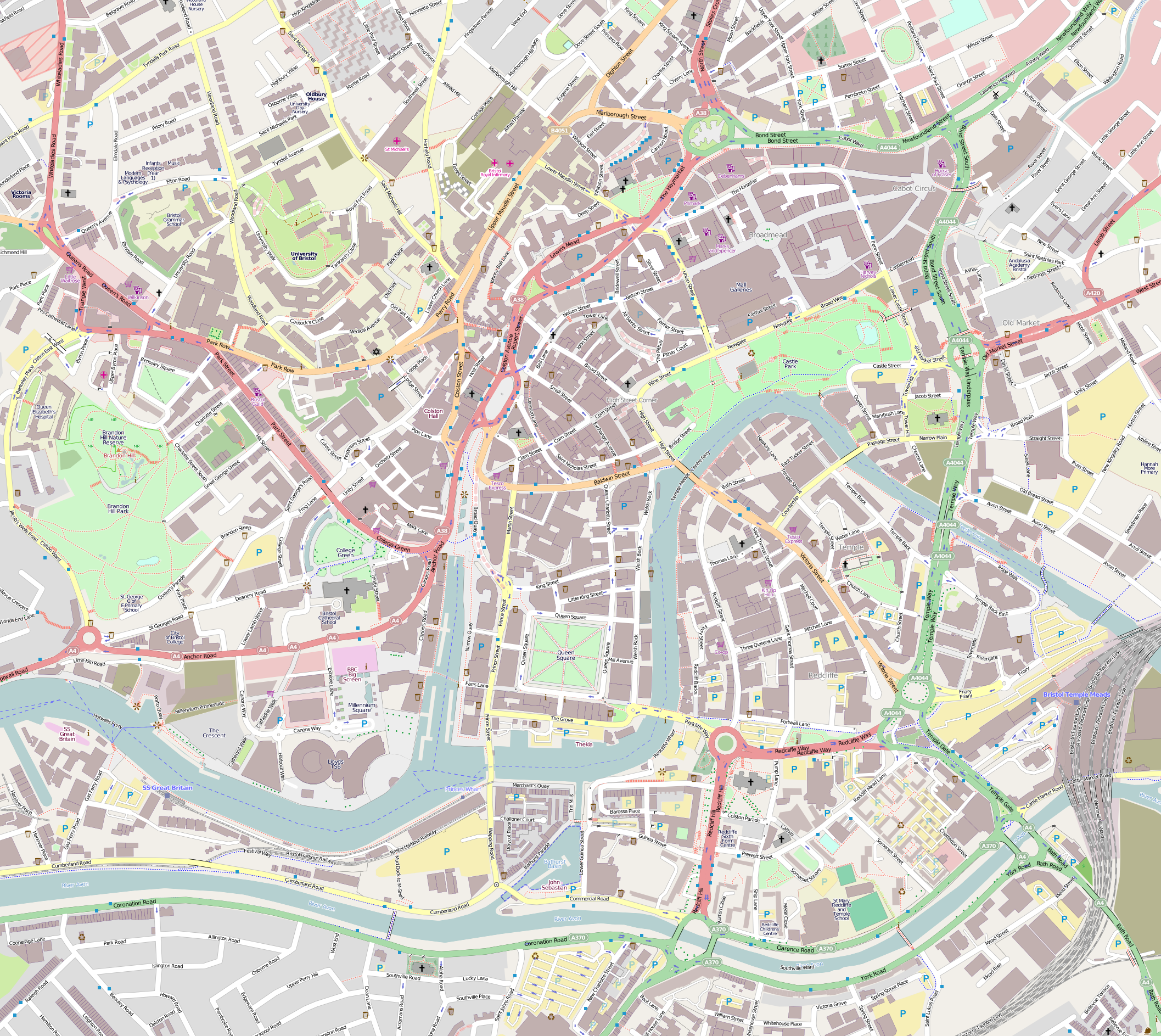
- Location within Bristol Central
- Maintained by: Bristol City Council
- Location: Bristol, England
- Postal code: BS1
- Coordinates: 51°27′17″N 2°35′29″W
- East: Peter Street
- West: High Street

Mary le Port Street (also known as St Mary le Port Street, Maryleport Street or Maryport Street) was an important thoroughfare from an early stage in the development of the settlement of Bristol, England, linking the area around St Peter's Church and, later, Bristol Castle with the Saxon core of the town to the west at High Street, Wine Street, Corn Street and Broad Street. It was heavily damaged by aerial bombing in 1940, and was relegated to an unnamed service road and footway in post-war reconstruction of the area.

Recent versions of the Bristol Local Plan have sought to re-instate this street and some of the surrounding historic street layout, to improve the link between the shopping area of Broadmead and the St Nicholas Market area.

== History ==
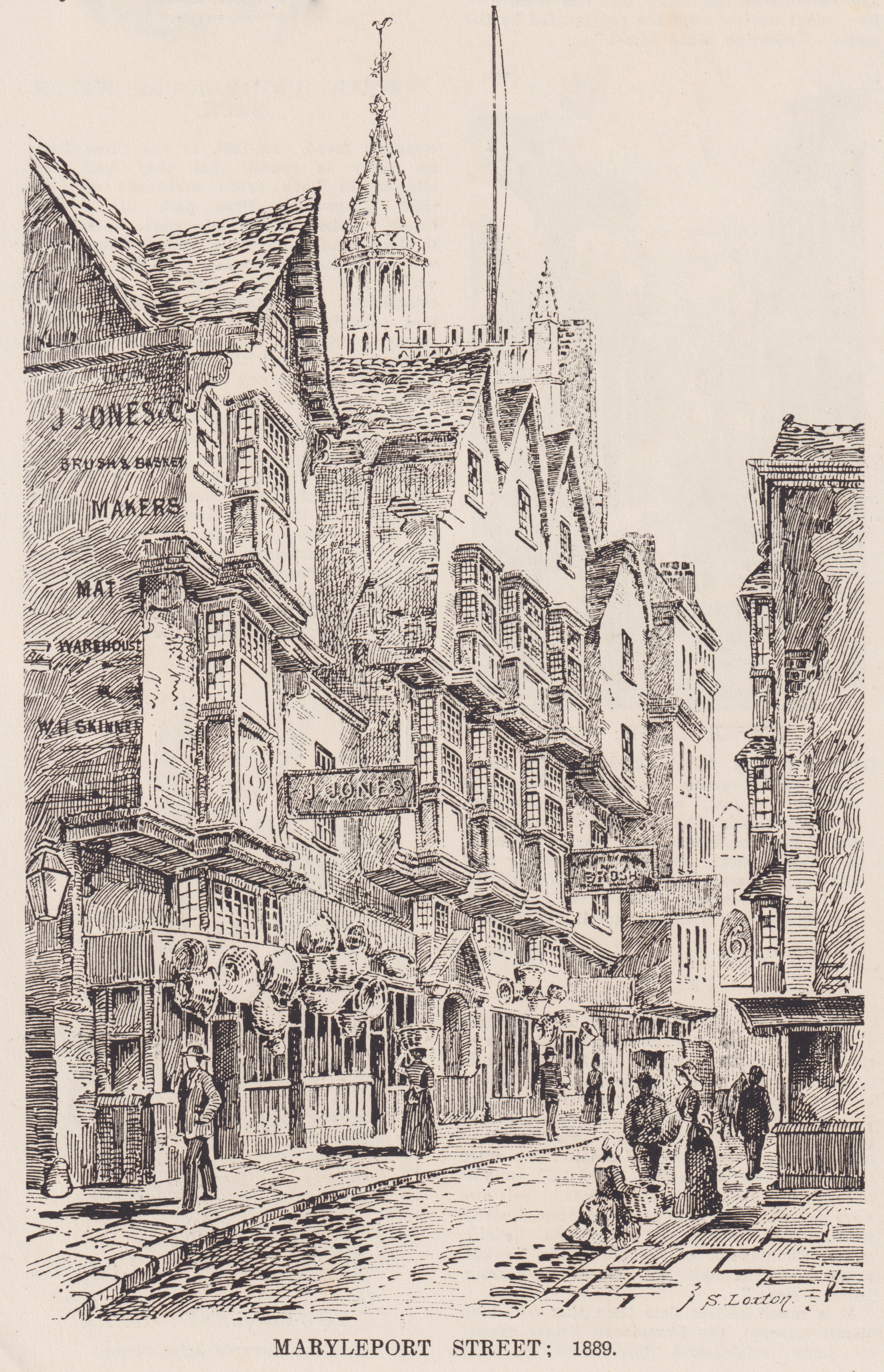
Mery le Port Street, 1889

Mary le Port Street originated as a pre-conquest hollow way. Archaeological excavations in 1962 to 1963 found evidence of late Saxon activity on either side of this way, and of a timber building from this period. In the 13th century or later the hollow way was filled in and paved, possibly using material derived from the digging out of cellars in the area.

St Mary le Port Church was probably built in Saxon times, and was subsequently enlarged and rebuilt to reach its peak of development in the 15th century.

Writing in the 1920s, Charles Wells described Maryleport St as a place where:

...in the old time all the houses overhung so far that it used to be said opposite neighbours could shake hands out of the window. Most of these houses have now given way to less picturesque, but more convenient buildings, but there are still a few of the old ones left.

— Charles Wells, Bristol's History

Wells described the church as being much hidden from view by these old shops, and best viewed from its churchyard behind. The street made an impression on J. B. Priestley when he visited in 1933:

What is especially admirable about Bristol is that it is both old and alive, and not one of your museum pieces, living on tourists and the sale of bogus antiques. It can show you all the crypts and gables and half-timbering you want to see; offers you fantastic little old thoroughfares like Mary-Le-Port Street and Narrow Wine Street; has a fine display of the antique, the historical, the picturesque; but yet has not gone 'quaint' but is a real lively bustling city, earning its living and spending its own money.

— J B Priestley, English Journey (1934)

Along with the surrounding ancient streets, Mary le Port Street was bombed on the night of 24 November 1940 and almost completely destroyed.

Post-war reconstruction plans for a new Civic Centre – consisting of an art gallery, museum, hotel and exhibition centre, to be built in the area between St Peter's Church and High Street – came to nothing, and the sites on either side of Mary le Port Street were leased to the Bank of England and the Norwich Union Insurance Company, whose now-derelict buildings still occupy the sites.

== Today ==
Mary le Port Street has disappeared from the map; its carriageway was taken up in October 1963. The ruins of St Mary le Port Church are a scheduled monument, whilst the tower is a listed building.

In 2018, Bristol City Council sought to reinstate this street:

The reinstatement of St Mary-le-Port street as a primary pedestrian axis linking St Nicholas Markets to St Peter's Church is a priority, along with establishing a grain of buildings that will allow for the proper integration of the Church.

— Bristol City Council, The City Centre Framework-Old City-character statement and place plan

The site was sold to international investment company Federated Hermes in 2020. Developer MEPC stated that they intended to create "A new memorable and distinctive place that reinstates lost streets and routes that existed before the Second World War".

The site of Mary le Port Street is within the Old City and Queen Square Conservation Area.

== Gallery ==
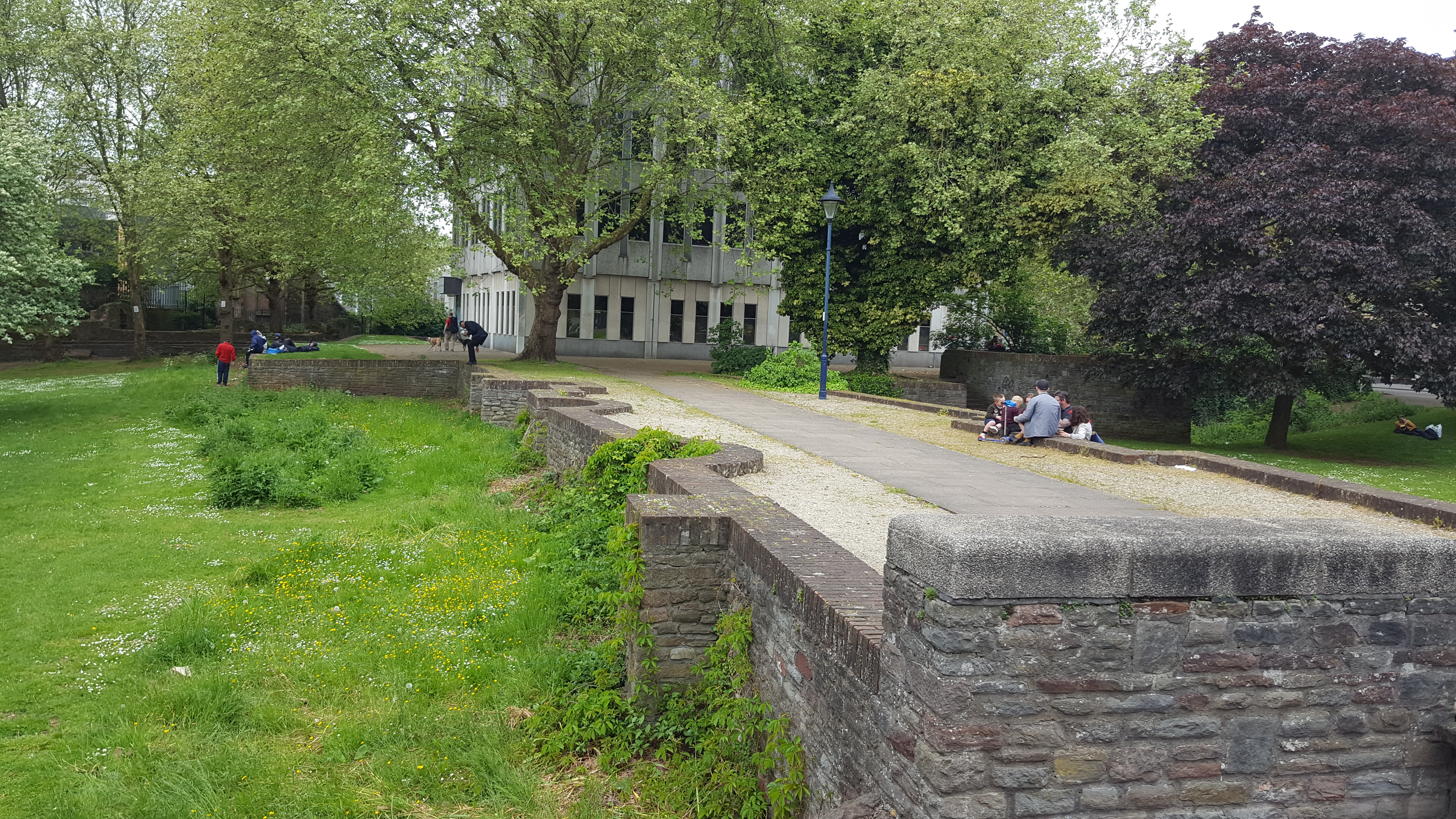
Remains of Mary le Port Street, looking towards High Street from St Peter's Church

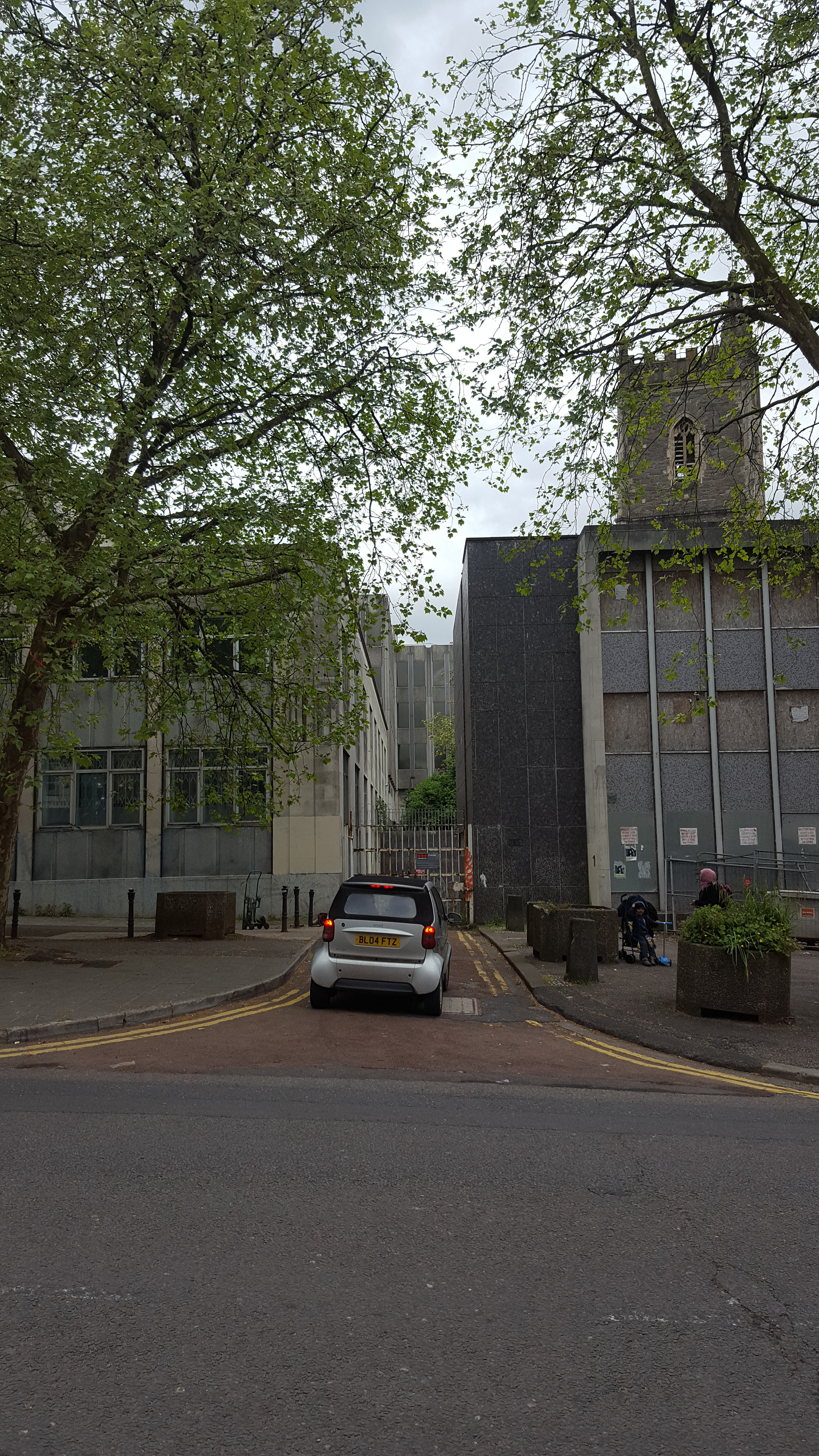
Looking across High Street into the former Mary le Port Street; tower of church is visible on right

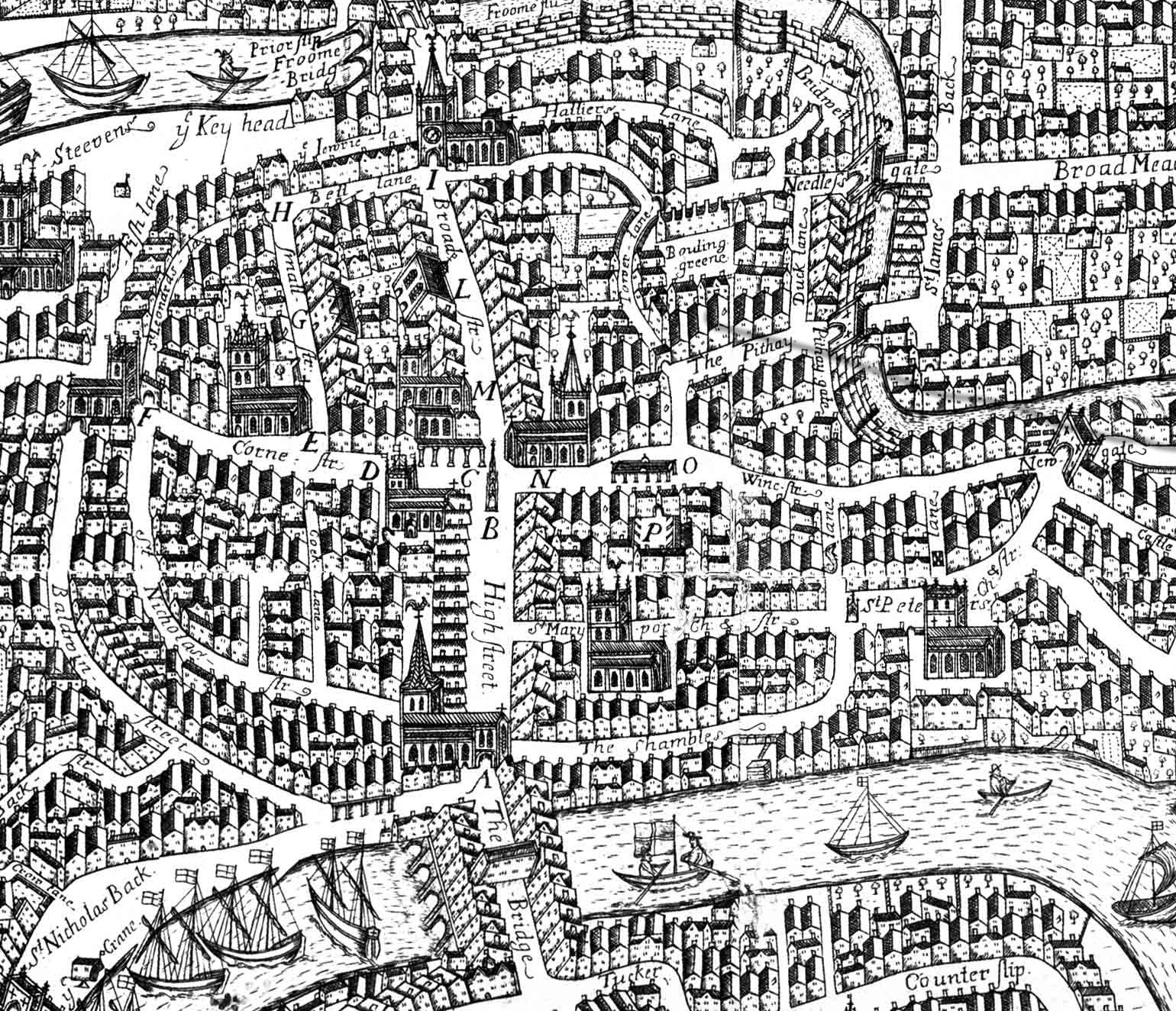
James Millerd's Map of 1671, showing Mary le Port Street and Church
