= St Peter's Hospital, Bristol =

Former hospital in Bristol, England

St Peter's Hospital
- Watercolour of St Peter's Hospital, Bristol, former headquarters of the Bristol Corporation of the Poor, 1894

- Location within Bristol
- Former names: The Sugar House, The Mint

General information
- Architectural style: Jacobean
- Location: Bristol, England
- Coordinates: 51.455174°N 2.58951°W
- Construction started: Seventeenth century
- Demolished: 1940, Bristol Blitz
- Client: Robert Aldworth

Technical details
- Structural system: Timber frame

St Peter's Hospital, Bristol could be found to the rear of St Peter's church until it was destroyed in the Bristol Blitz in 1940.

== History ==
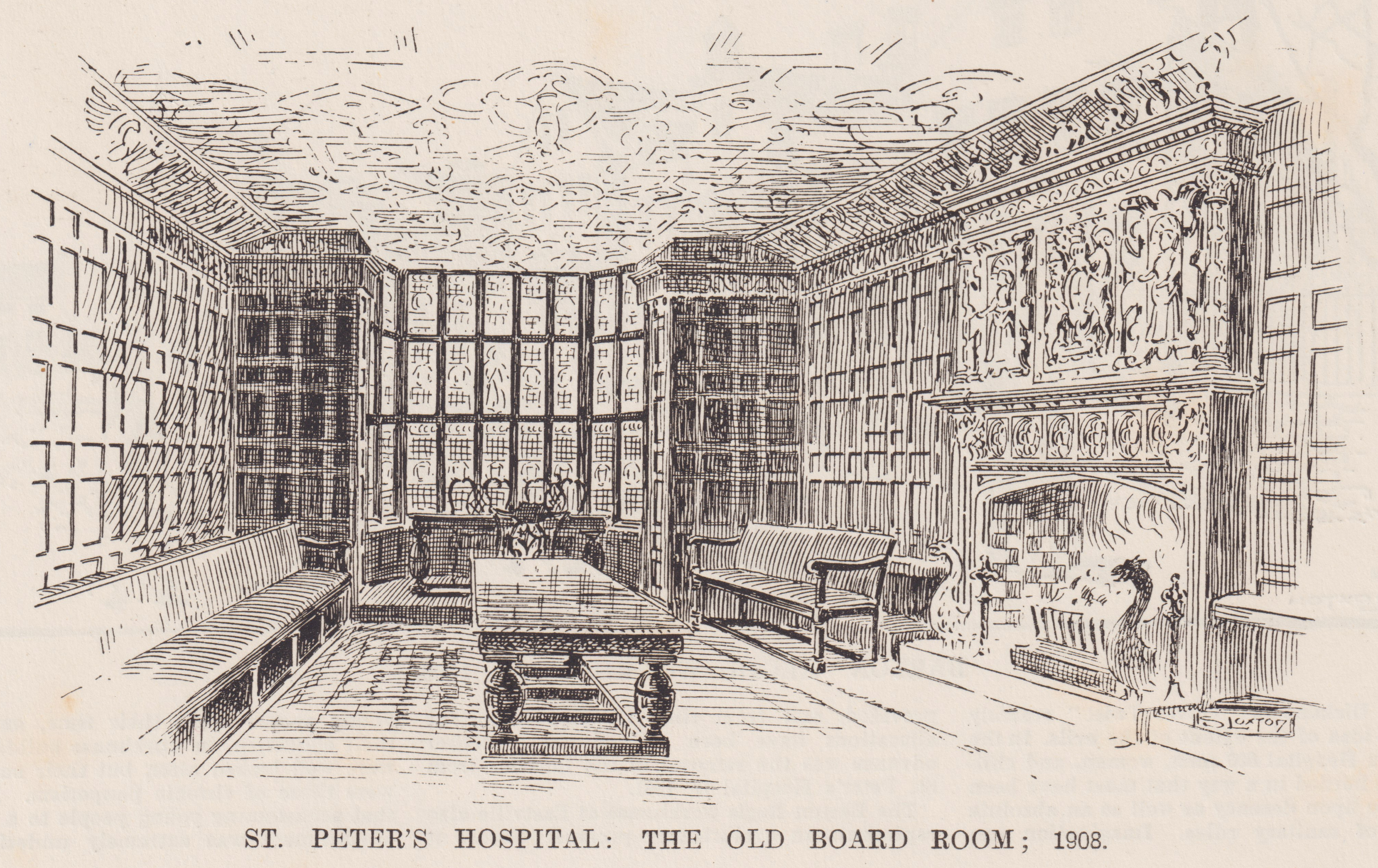
Old Board Room, 1908

A house had stood on that site since approximately 1400 and the hospital was a timbered, gabled mansion. In 1607 the building was bought by a rich merchant named Robert Aldworth who went about completely rebuilding it. In later years (circa 1634) it passed into the ownership of Thomas Elbridge and later still for a short period of time the building was the Bristol Mint.

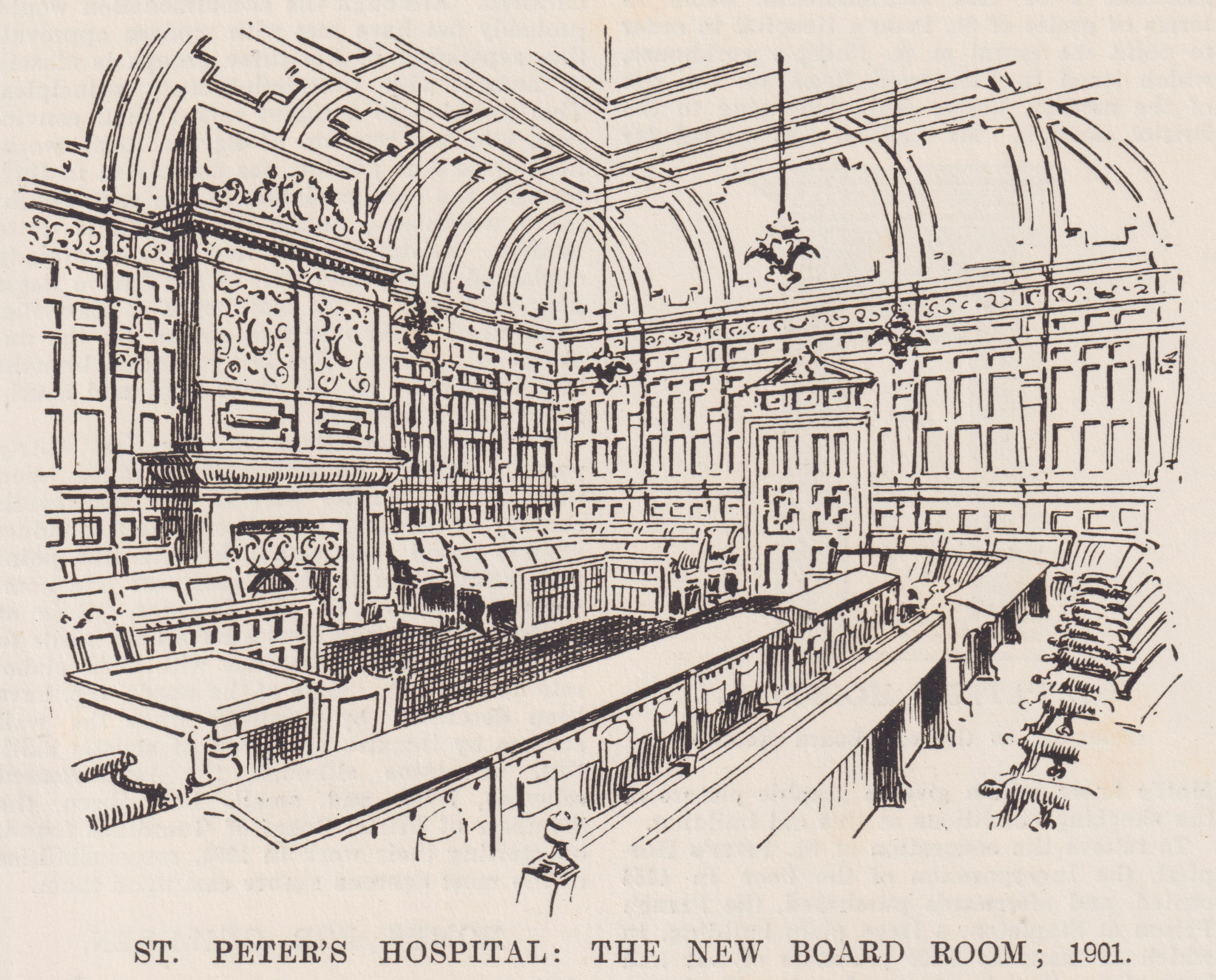
New Board Room, 1901

The old Bristol Mint was then bought by the Corporation in 1696 for £800 to be used as a workhouse for the Bristol Corporation of the Poor and it is in this role as a paupers' workhouse that the building is much better known. It was later called St Peter's Hospital as in 1820 85 inmates looked after 306 sick ones. After the cholera outbreak of 1836, the corporation of the poor rented the defunct prison at Stapleton, thereby founding Blackberry Hill Hospital. St Peter's Hospital was destroyed in the Bristol Blitz in 1940.

St Peter's Hospice, established in 1969, is named after St Peter's Hospital.

== Archives ==
While many of the registers and records of St Peter's Hospital were destroyed when the building was hit by an incendiary device during the Bristol Blitz other papers, photographs and documents related to the site and the institution survive, and are held at Bristol Archives.
