= Lawford's Gate =

Former defensive gate and current area of Bristol

Coordinates: 51.4565°N 2.5799°W

Sketch of Lawford's Gate by James Stewart in 1746

Lawford’s Gate is an area of Bristol and was the main defensive entry point, a stone arch through the town’s, then city’s boundary, towards Bristol Castle and the city from the direction of London. From 1373 or earlier Lawford’s Gate acted as a focal point for visits by English Kings and Queens, for English civil war skirmishes, plague control, reform riots, and as the boundary between castle and royal forest, then later between city and lawless “Alsatia”.

The gate was demolished in 1768, by which time the name had passed to a nearby house of correction. Today the Lawford’s Gate area of Bristol includes the street named Lawford’s Gate, Lawford Gate House on Lawford Street, and Lawford’s Gate park.

== History ==
Map of Bristol in the 13th century from 1882. Lawford's Gate marked at far right

The gate was first referenced in 1373 in Bristol’s Royal Charter and in the perambulation of the city boundary; the arch was demolished in 1768. It was located close to the junction of Old Market Street, West Street and Midland Road.

The origin of the name Lawford’s Gate was from Hlaford’s Gate, as a derivation from the Saxon word Lord. Some accounts refer to this as the gate of the Lord of Bristol Castle, and others as more generally loaf-giver’s gate.

In the early medieval period the Royal Forest of Kingswood was noted as extending up to Lawford’s Gate. A 1610 map of Kingswood Forest included Lawford’s Gate as a boundary. The gate became a point of issue in James I's investigation into the ownership of Kingswood, due to the rights the forest gave owners to charge cheminage, or conduit money, of goods through the gates in the weeks around Bristol’s great annual fairs.

=== City Gate ===
Lawford's Gate on Millerd's 1673 map of Bristol

The first Lawford’s Gate was likely built in the late 1100s or early 1200s. Lawford’s Gate was a masonry gate set in Bristol’s eastern defensive ‘great ditch’ as observed by William Worcestre. During the medieval period housing and the Barstaple almshouse had been erected in the immediate vicinity.

By the fifteenth century the area east of the gate was thinly populated and, apart from dwellings close to the gate, largely rural. In the seventeenth century there was a figurative “explosion” of development up to and beyond Lawford’s Gate. By 1673 the road was occupied by a continuous row of buildings and a 1745 sketch shows Lawford’s Gate “sandwiched tightly between houses on either site of it.” As the London gateway to Bristol, West Street approaching the gate was the setting for many inns and lodging houses.

In 1480 William Worcestre noted that in the fourteenth century an existing Lawford’s Gate was rebuilt by the Barstaple who, with his wife Isobel, also built the two Trinity Hospital sites immediately adjacent.

From before 1373 until its demolition in 1768, Lawford’s Gate held the role of focal point for local dignitaries to welcome to Bristol distinguished visitors arriving from the London direction. Kings and Queens were “received here and welcomed by the mayor and his scarlet robed brethren.” Henry VII entered through the gate just after the Battle of Bosworth in 1485 and Stuart monarchs Charles I, Charles II, James II and Queen Anne, as well as Lord Protector Oliver Cromwell, were welcomed at the gate to great pomp and ceremony. At her leaving ceremony at the gate in 1613 James I’s queen, Anne of Denmark, remarked of her reception that she “never knew she was Queen” until she visited Bristol.

For Queen Elizabeth I’s visit in 1574 a local tax was levied to paint and gild Lawford’s Gate, to level the streets with 53 tonnes of sand and to present the Queen £100 in gold in a “splendid purse”. The tax income did not meet the full costs, so £500 was “borrowed from charity funds” to meet the difference.

When the royalist side in the English Civil War captured Bristol Lawford’s Gate was fortified. In September 1643 four regiments of Parliamentary forces attacked either side of the gate under Colonels Montague and Pickering, breaking through and advancing to the castle and city walls; Cromwell later ordered the demolition of Bristol Castle in 1656.

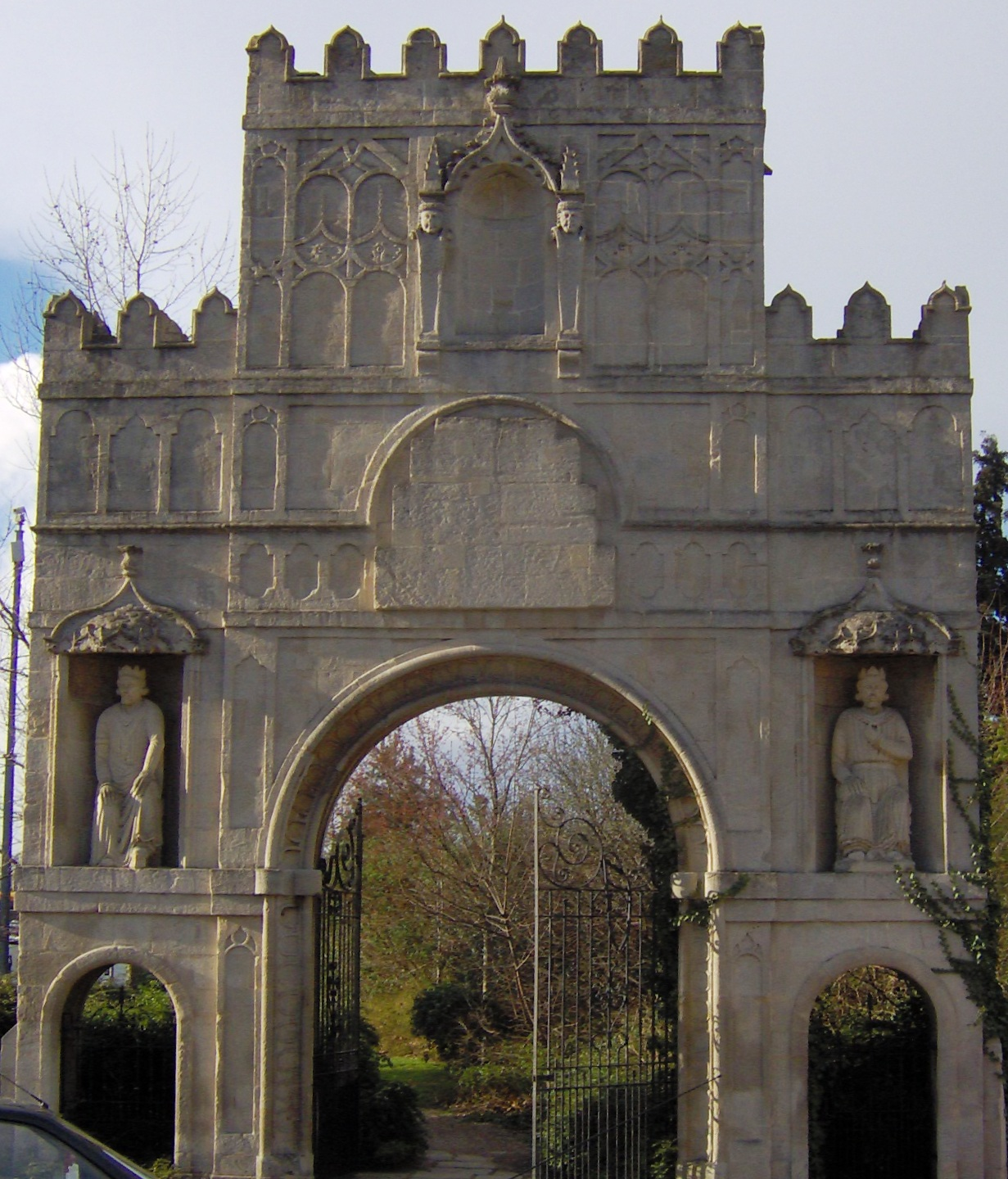
Victorian replicas of the Lawford's Gate effigies at Arno's Court Triumphal Arch

Following several proposals for its demolition, the gate was finally removed in the late 1760s to allow greater flow of traffic. The adjoining houses were also set back to allow road widening.

In 1726 the Bristol Turnpike Trust was founded to maintain and levy a charge on the use of main arterial routes. A toll house was operated at Lawford’s Gate and at West Street until the removal of all of the trust’s gates in 1866.

The integral statues of the assumed King Edward I and King Edward III were relocated to Arno’s Court Triumphal Arch at around this time. They were later removed for their preservation in 1898 and returned to the Bristol Corporation.

=== Prison and Reform Riots ===
The first informal prison in the vicinity, described as a cage, was in place “near Lawford’s Gate” by 1647. Lawford’s Gate prison was built in 1716 with what were described as the best conditions in the county, and rebuilt in 1791 as part of a wider penal reform efforts by George Onesiphorus.

The burning of Lawford's Gate Prison in the Bristol Riots of 1831, by James Baker Pyne

In 1831 Lawford’s Gate prison and nearby toll house were set ablaze as part of the Bristol Reform Riots and the prisoners freed. The nearby and half-built Holy Trinity Church was protected from the angry crowd by the police.

Lawford’s Gate prison was not rebuilt and was little used from this point and fully abandoned as a prison by 1860, then being used as the Lawford’s Gate police court. The final buildings demolished in 1926 when a new courthouse was built elsewhere and the area redeveloped.

=== ‘Without Lawford’s Gate’ ===
Residents without Lawford’s Gate were blamed for the Bristol Reform Riots of 1831. According to The Observer on 6 November 1831 thousands gathered: not "mechanics" but "boys, unemployed, wretched and vice in St Philips and Lawfords Gate. Not few women of abandoned character using violent language". Whilst it was politically expedient to blame the lawless outsider, modern reassessments of the riots concluded the rioters were Bristol residents, within Lawford’s Gate.

The perpetrators of the Bristol Weavers’ Revolts of 1726-32 were typically described as living without Lawford’s Gate or in the Lawford’s Gate district.

Lawford's Gate Prison whipping post by Fred Little

Lawford’s Gate was often described as a district of “vice and disorder”, “reputedly inhabited by outlaws, squatters and miners of coal”. Wesley described its people as a “rebel rout” but noted improvement over time. Harvey described the district without Lawford’s Gate as an “alsatia” and noted it was home to one, if not two, Leper Hospitals including St Lawrence. During periods of plague control merchants attending Bristol’s great fairs were required to quarantine in the vicinity of Lawford’s Gate.

=== Integration with Bristol ===
Cottages had sprung up in the area without Lawford’s Gate from the seventeenth century onwards, amounting to 15,777 by 1831. This urban sprawl was to the displeasure of Bristol burgesses who saw residents using the city but without making a financial contribution to Bristol.

In 1835 and 1897 there were efforts by the Bristol Corporation to extend the city boundaries to be coterminous with the geography of city’s parliamentary representation; this saw the Lawford’s Gate area formally join Bristol in 1835.

In 1906 Harvey noted that the Lawford’s Gate police court existed to deal with Gloucestershire county criminal cases, despite no longer being in Gloucestershire.

== Current area and legacy ==
Lawford’s Gate, as an arch and thoroughfare, was situated on what is now Old Market Street and West Street, running along the present road outside Redcross Lane and Barstaple House on the west side, to the junction of Bull Paunch Lane to the east. Bull Paunch Lane was renamed Lawford Street by the 1880s.

Lawfords Gate House, modern apartments near the site of Lawford's Gate

Prior to the demolition of the arch the name Lawford’s Gate had been adopted by the local house of correction a short distance to the northeast. The prison site was replaced by Lawford’s Gate pleasure gardens and by the 1930s the prison buildings replaced by corporation owned flats Wessex House, Gloucester House and Somerset House to rehouse residents displaced in city centre slum clearances. The road running to the north of the prison was known as Gloucester Road until the 1920s, and by the 1950s to the present time was renamed Lawford’s Gate.

The broad area between the former gate and the prison was sometimes referred to as Lawford’s Gate, or the ‘prison district’. The first UK Labour Prime Minister Ramsay Macdonald refers to walking through this district when recounting his first experience with socialism at a West Street coffee house.

Immediately to the north of the site of Lawford’s Gate, on Lawford Street, are modern residential apartments named Lawfords Gate House.

=== Lawford’s Gate Park ===
In 1880 at the Lawford’s Gate court quarter sessions justices resolved to sell the garden at the back of the police court. The Bristol Corporation disputed this plan, claiming ownership over the land themselves. In 1888 this ground adjoining the Lawford’s Gate prison was laid out as half as pleasure gardens and half as a playpark by the Bristol Corporation at a cost of £1,000. In the 1920s to 1950s the park was known as Trinity Road Park.

Original statue from Lawford's Gate, now on display at the Bristol MShed museum

Lawford’s Gate park was actively promoted as recently as 2018 and is covered by Bristol City Council byelaws for pleasure grounds, public walks and open spaces but is no longer listed by the council as an active park.

=== Remains of the monument ===
Following their repatriation from the Arno’s Court triumphal arch to the Bristol Corporation, the statues of Edward I and Edward III were donated to the Bristol Museum in 1907. In the 1970s they moved to the St Nicholas church museum until its closure. Following specialist conservation both statues are now on display at the Bristol M Shed museum on Wapping Wharf. In 2020 Bristol and Avon Archaeology said of the statues “they have been referred to as effigies of Edward I and Edward III since the late 1800s, though this is unlikely to be their original identity.” Late Victorian era replicas of the statues can be found on Arno’s Court Triumphal Arch in Brislington.
