= St Peter's Church, Castle Park, Bristol =

Ruined church in Bristol, England

St Peter's church
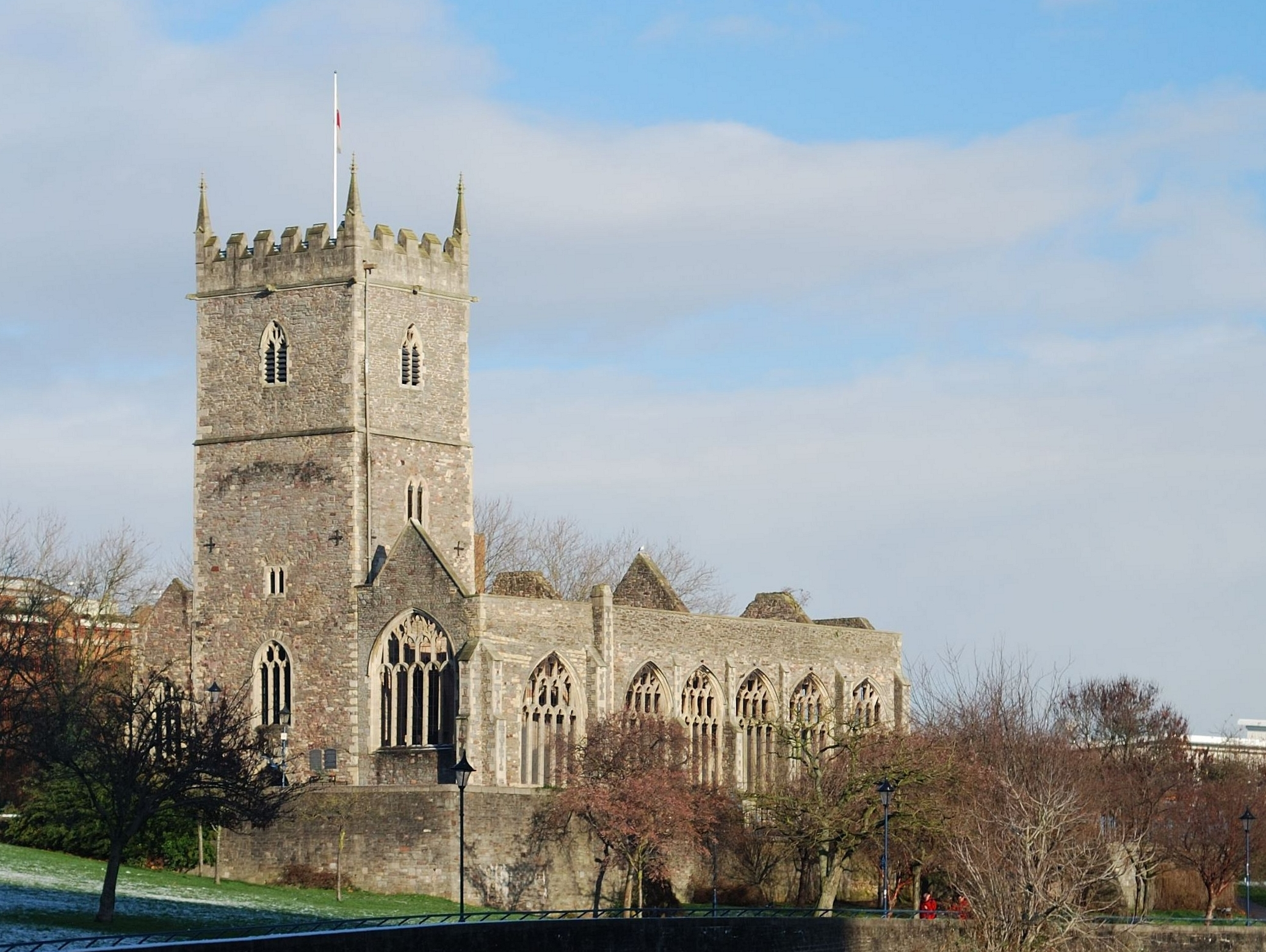
- St Peter's Church from Bristol Bridge

- Location within Bristol

General information
- Location: Bristol, England
- Coordinates: 51.4553°N 2.5897°W
- Completed: 12th century

St Peter's Church is a ruined church in Castle Park, Bristol, England. It was bombed during World War II and is now preserved as a memorial.

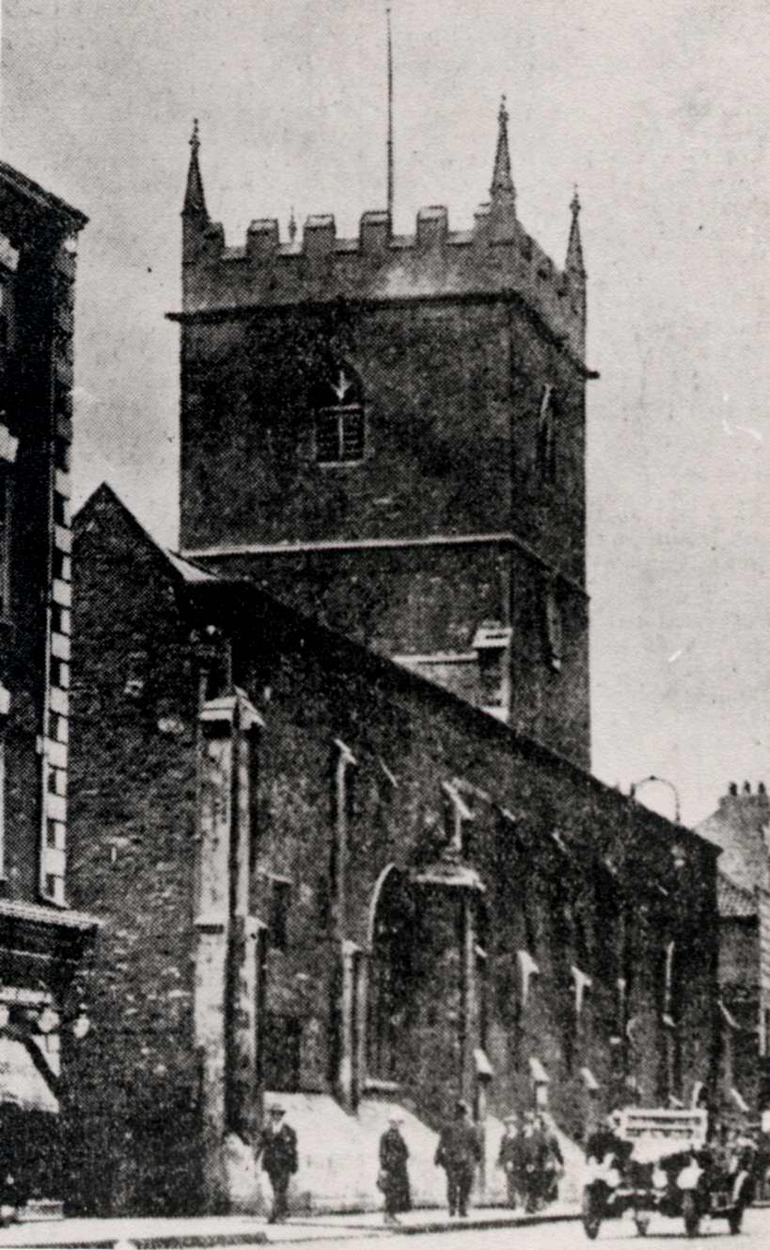
Taken c.1925 from the North East. On the extreme left and right of the image can be seen the buildings of the Castle district, which were heavily bombed during the Bristol Blitz, leaving the area known as Castle Park.

The foundation of the church can be traced back to 1106 when it was endowed on Tewkesbury Abbey, with a 12th-century lower tower, the rest of the church being built in the 15th century. Excavations in 1975 suggest that this was the site of Bristol's first church; the 12th-century city wall runs under the west end of the present church. It was bombed during the Bristol Blitz of 24–25 November 1940 and ruined. It is maintained as a monument to the civilian war dead of Bristol.

It has been designated by English Heritage as a grade II* listed building.

The church ran St Peter's Hospital, a workhouse located between the church and Floating Harbour which was destroyed by bombing during the Bristol Blitz.

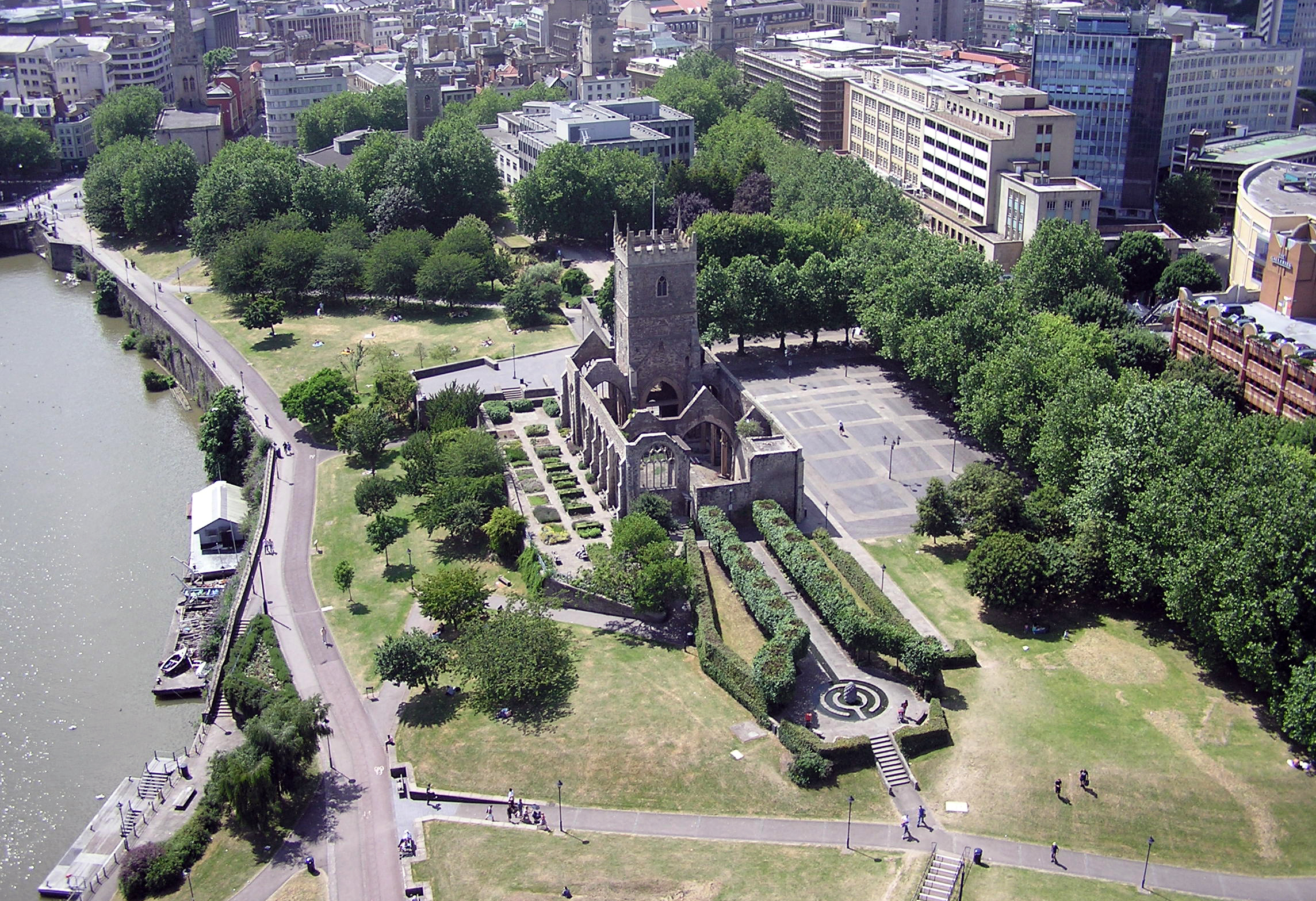
The church was gutted by enemy action on November 24/25 1940.

== Archives ==
Parish records for St Peter's church, Bristol are held at Bristol Archives (Ref. P. St PE) (online catalogue) including a baptism register, marriage registers and a burial register. The archive also includes records of the incumbent, churchwardens, charities, societies and vestry plus plans and photographs. Some of these records were severely damaged when the church was bombed but duplicate entries of the parish registers can be found in the bishop's transcripts of these records.

== See also ==
- Churches in Bristol
- Grade II* listed buildings in Bristol
