= Robert Aldworth =

Robert Aldworth (died 1634) was a Bristol-born English merchant and philanthropist. Much of his wealth, although used often for generous purposes, was acquired through the trade and exploitation of slaves. He became Mayor of Bristol in 1609.

== Sugar Trade ==
In 1612, Aldworth set up the first sugar processing business in Bristol, England, where sugar was processed in 'sugar houses'. Aldworth's sugar house refined sugar produced by slaves from Spanish and Portuguese plantations in Madeira, Brazil and the Azores.

== Involvement in the Slave Trade ==
Aldworth and his relative Thomas Aldworth, were members of the Society of Merchant Venturers, a group dating back to the 16th century to promote and protect Bristol merchants and trade. This included involvement in the transatlantic slave trade.

== Tomb ==
His tomb is in St Peter's Church in the centre of Bristol had sugar loaves carved on it.
