= Bristol Blitz =

WWII aerial bombardment of British city

- Part of the Strategic bombing campaign of World War II
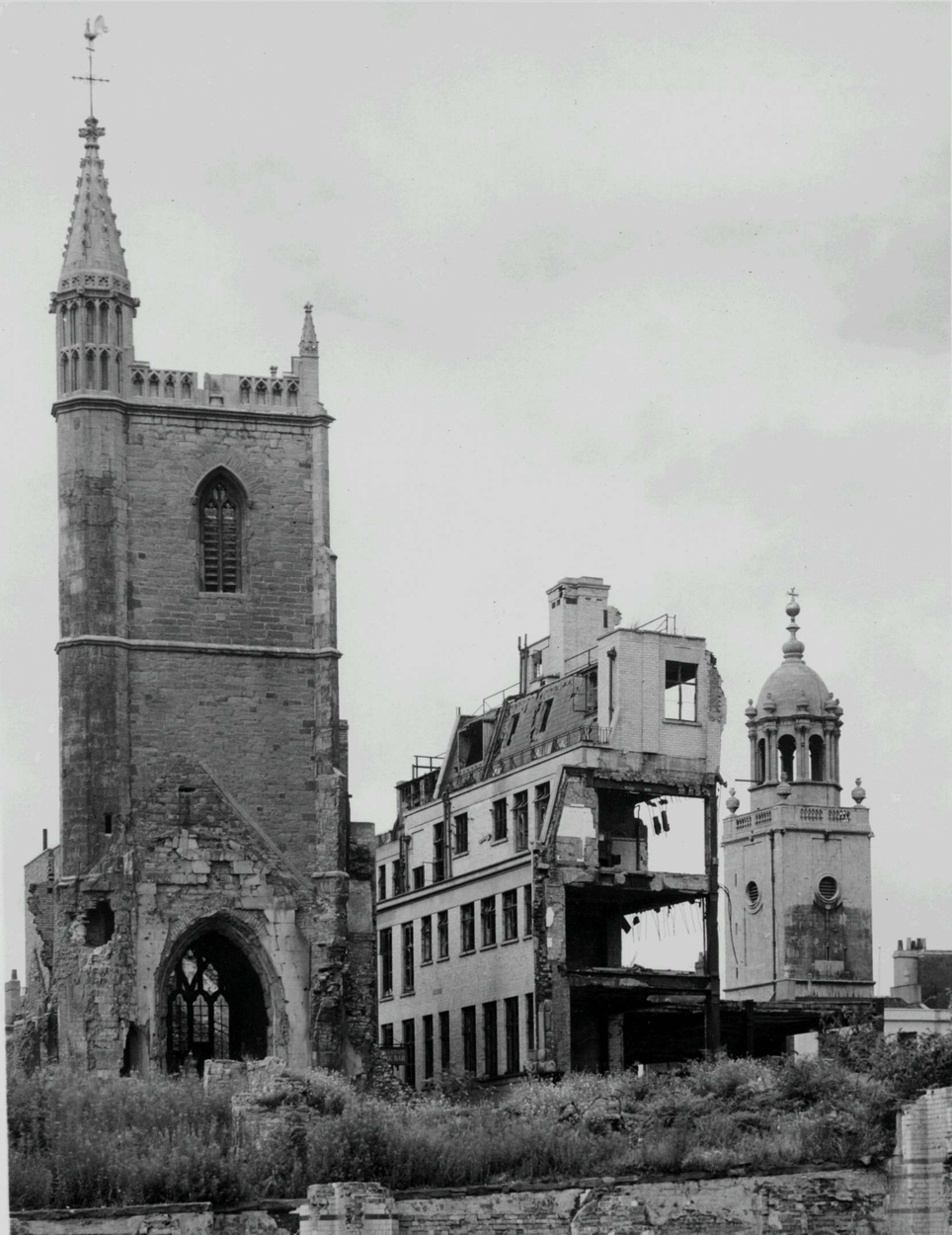
- Bomb-damaged buildings and the remains of St Mary le Port church (left) viewed from the south east, following bombing of the area now known as Castle Park
Date	1940–1941
Location	Bristol
Result	Bristol heavily damaged by German air raids

Belligerents
Nazi Germany	United Kingdom

Casualties and losses
Unknown	1,299 killed, 1,303 injured

The Bristol Blitz was the heavy bombing of Bristol, England by the Nazi German Luftwaffe during the Second World War. Due to the presence of Bristol Harbour and the Bristol Aeroplane Company, the city was a target for bombing and was easily found as enemy bombers were able to trace a course up the River Avon from Avonmouth using reflected moonlight on the waters, into the heart of the city. Bristol was the sixth-most heavily bombed British city of the war.

The Luftwaffe conducted six major bombing campaigns on Bristol between November 1940 and April 1941, causing Bristol to experience 548 air raid alerts and 77 air raids with:

- 919 tons of high-explosive bombs plus many thousands of incendiary bombs dropped in clusters
- 1,299 people killed, 1,303 seriously injured and 697 rescued from the debris of bombed buildings
- 89,080 buildings damaged including 81,830 houses destroyed and over 3,000 rendered unusable and later demolished.

To counter the raids, Bristol's defenders developed an air defence system that increased in size and sophistication during the course of the war; local heavy anti-aircraft guns fired c. 59,000 rounds at attacking aircraft during the conflict.

== First raids ==
On 2 November 1940, the Luftwaffe dropped 5,000 incendiary and 10,000 high explosive bombs on the old city in a night raid.

On 24 November 1940, Luftflotte 3 bombers left Germany to bomb Bristol. The attack started at 6:30 pm and continued in waves. Groups of two or three bombers passed over Bristol and dropped in total around 12,000 incendiary bombs and 160 tons of high-explosive bombs; within an hour over 70 fires had started. Park Street was "smashed" and the Bristol Museum & Art Gallery hit, 207 people were killed and thousands of houses were destroyed or damaged. The area that is now Castle Park was extensively damaged. The Jacobean St Peter's Hospital was destroyed, and the 17th century timber-framed Dutch House was damaged and subsequently demolished. Four of Bristol's ancient churches (St Peter's, the interior of St Nicholas, St Mary-le-Port and Temple Church) were also badly damaged. St James' Presbyterian Church was gutted.

The Lord Mayor of Bristol, Alderman Thomas Underdown, described the effect of the raids as "The 'City of Churches' had in one night become the city of ruins."

On 7 December 1940, bombs hit a Bristol to Salisbury train, killing several passengers including a number of soldiers.

== Following raids ==
The longest raid on Bristol occurred on 3–4 January 1941, and lasted 12 hours, during which the Luftwaffe dropped their biggest bomb on the city. It was nicknamed "Satan", and weighed 2,000 kilograms (4,400 lb), measuring over 8 feet (2.4 m) long (without the tail), and 26 inches (66 cm) in diameter. It failed to explode and was recovered in April 1943. The bomb disposal crew dug down 29 feet (8.8 m) to get to it. Later, during the VE Day Victory Parade, the bomb was paraded through the streets of London.

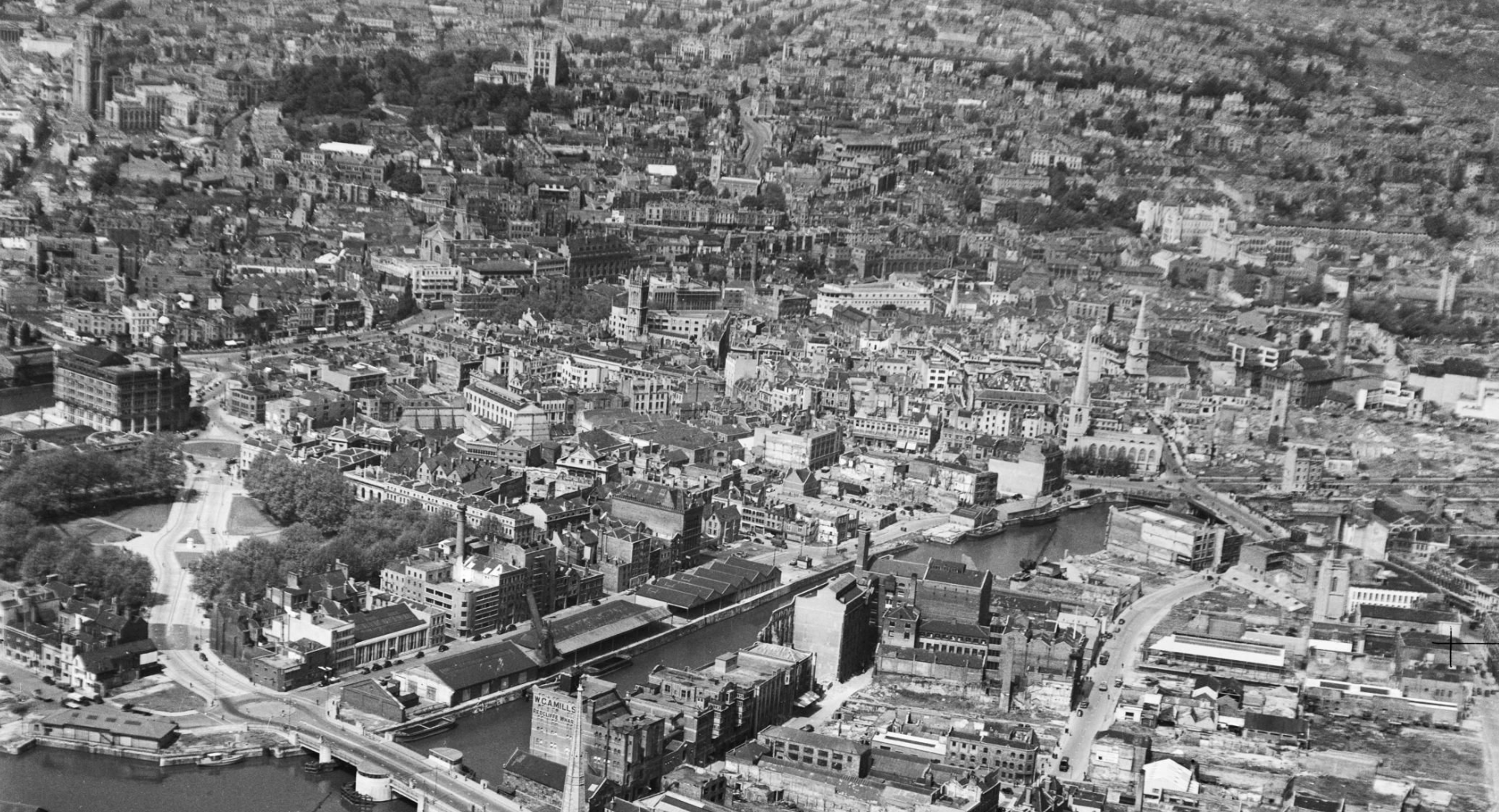
Bristol in 1946 showing bomb damage around St Mary le Port Church

=== Bristol Good Friday air raids ===
The infamous Good Friday air raids caused further damage to the centre of the city, Knowle, Hotwells, Cotham and Filton, and caused the permanent closure of the Bristol Tramways. Winston Churchill visited the ruins on 12 April 1941. The last air raid of the Blitz on Bristol was on 25 April 1941, when Brislington, Bedminster and Knowle were bombed. It is speculated that these suburbs were not the targets themselves but that bombs intended for Filton's manufacturing areas were mistakenly dropped on other areas.

One of the common types of bomb dropped on the city was a canister containing many incendiaries (locally known as Goering's Bread Basket – from the Molotov bread basket device); these caused numerous fires and were designed to cause panic amongst the citizens, and stretch the fire services to their limits.

The last raid on Bristol was on 15 May 1944.

Bristol was in danger of being hit by V-1 flying bombs, and by the A4/V2 rockets, whose launching platforms had already been built on the Cotentin Peninsula in France in 1944. However, the Allied invasion of Normandy on 6 June 1944 saw these platforms quickly overrun and consequently no V1 or V2 landed on Bristol.

The first historical account of the Bristol Blitz was published in January 1945, as thoughts turned to how best to rebuild the city after the war.

== Decoy sites ==
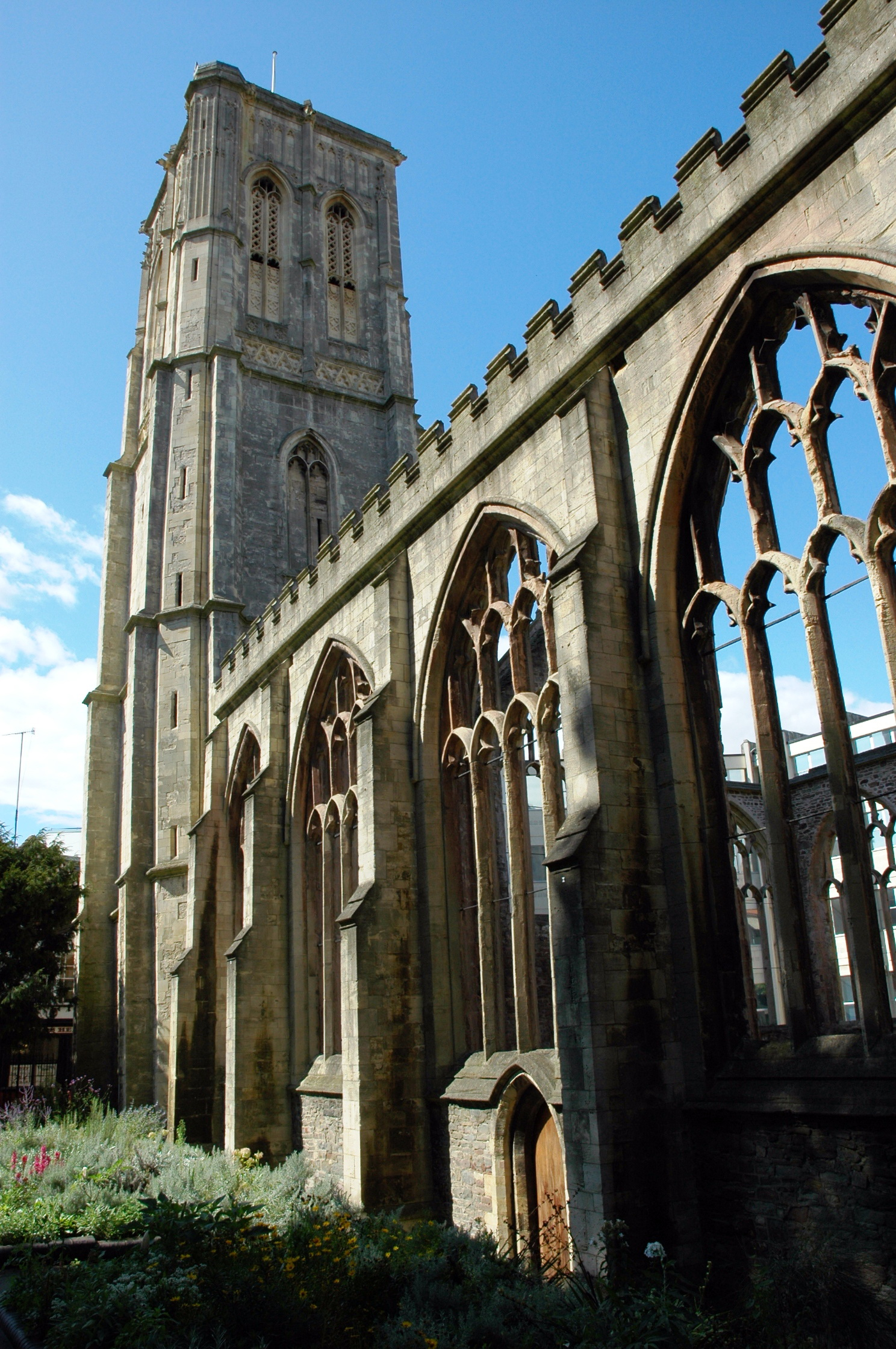
The ruins of Temple Church

In the early years of the Second World War following the bombing of Coventry in November 1940, many decoy sites were built with the intention of drawing enemy bombing raids away from the major cities. The main decoy for Bristol was at Black Down on the western end of the Mendip Hills, about 15 miles (24 km) southwest of Bristol. A smaller one was in the parish of Chew Magna. These were known as starfish sites, and were designed to simulate Bristol under blackout conditions, even to the extent of mimicking the flickering lights of railway marshalling yards. In the event of an imminent air raid, beacons were lit at the decoy sites.
