= Blanche Baker (painter) =

English artist

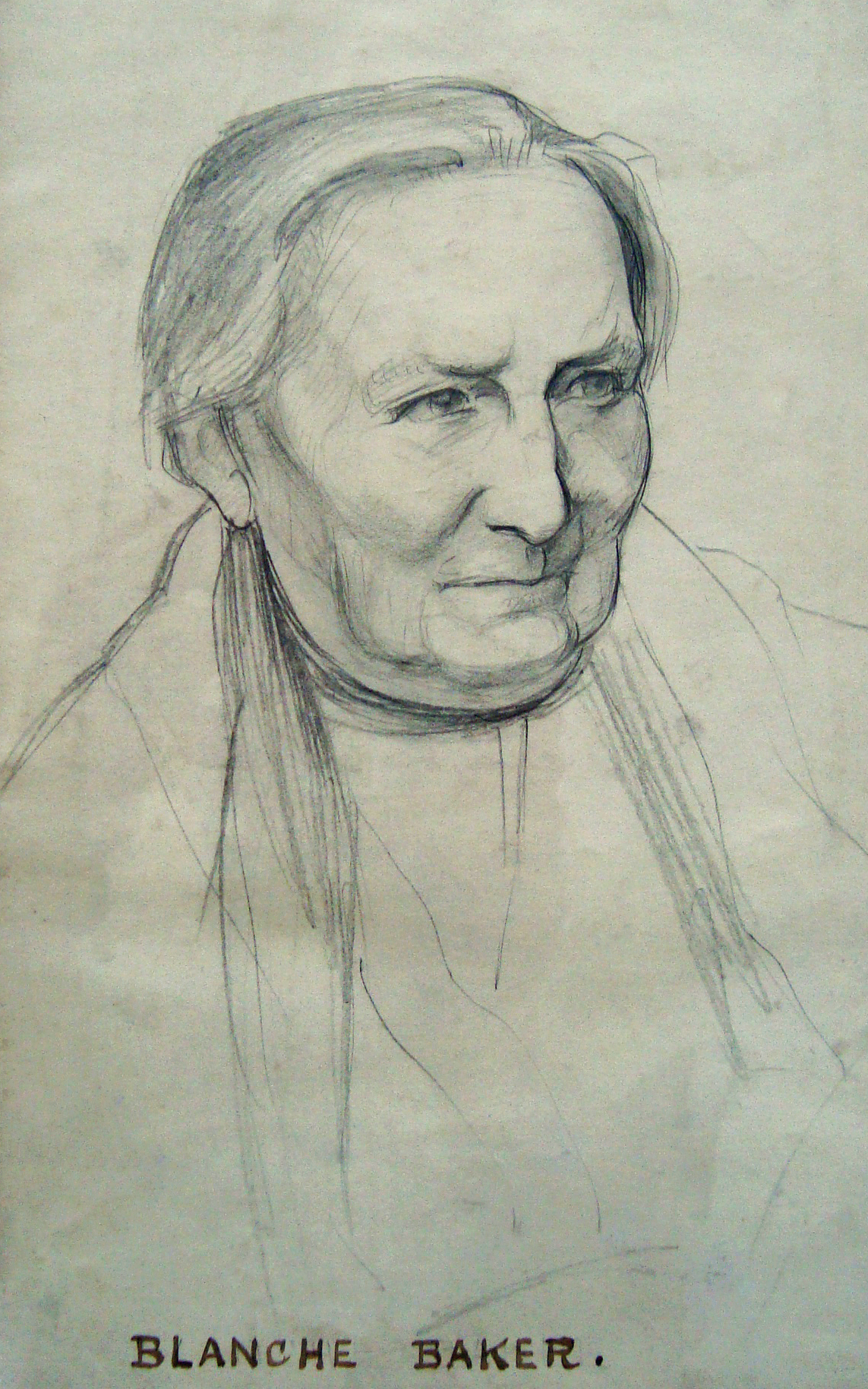
- Portrait of the Artist Self-portrait in pencil, c.1920
- Born: Ellen Blanche Baker; 1844; Bristol, England
- Died: 1929 (aged 84–85); Hampshire, England

Blanche Baker (1844–1929) was a Bristol-born English watercolour artist who specialised in landscape paintings. She trained at the Bristol School of Art, and went on to exhibit regularly at the Royal Academy and with the Society of Lady Artists and the Camsix Art Club. She taught drawing in London schools, and her work documents extensive British and European travel. In 1902 she was elected a full member of the Bristol Academy.

== Early life ==
Blanche Baker's father, William Baker, was born in Bristol in about 1820 and in 1840 married Mary Anne Crispin, whose mother was from Devon. They lived in Trenchard Street, in central Bristol. Initially he was a plasterer, then a builder. Ellen Blanche Baker was their third child and was christened at the Society of Protestant Dissenters in Lewin's Mead, Bristol, on 15 September 1844.

‘[William] came into some money from his father and succeeded in amassing a tolerably fair fortune’ – by 1861 he was a successful builder and contractor, employing 160 men, and at some point he also acquired a saw mill at Canon's Marsh, Bristol. The Baker family moved to Sneyd Park Villa in a wealthier part of Bristol. This was a substantial property with ‘lawns, gardens, a conservatory, stables and one and a half acres of land’ plus an adjacent farm. On the date of the 1861 census Blanche Baker was not actually in residence at Sneyd Park Villa, although the census indicates that she is one of nine siblings. Her grandmother Betsy Crispin had lived with them for several years, and there were live-in servants.

Following her general education, Blanche attended Bristol School of Art (established in 1853 as ‘Bristol School of Practical Art’ and later accommodated within the Bristol Academy for the Promotion of Fine Arts's grand building that had been opened in 1858. The School of Art would become the Royal West of England Academy Schools). She ‘graduated’ in 1864, winning a prize for Outline of Flowers – a work which qualified for the only National Medallion to be awarded to Bristol School of Art in that year. Meanwhile, in 1863, in the competitions that Bristol Rifle Club held annually in Sneyd Park, Blanche had taken second prize in the Ladies Rifle Match – 100 yards, seven shots with Prussian needle rifles. ‘These novelty, but interesting matches attracted, of course, a great gathering of both sexes.’

In 1865 Mary Baker, Blanche's mother, died at the age of 46. There were three girls under the age of 10 to be looked after, and presumably much of the running of the household now fell to Mary's older daughters Rosa, 23, Blanche, 20, and Kate, 16. The oldest boy, Herbert, 21, had followed his father into the building business.

== Artistic success and a family crisis ==
The acceptance of a watercolour drawing, Greenfell Lane, Gloucester, by the Royal Academy in 1869 seems to have been a turning point for Blanche's artistic career. In early 1870 she had a one-person show in Bristol – 70 watercolours (some framed and others unframed) – and in the summer of that year The Turnstile was selected for the Royal Academy. Blanche would sign her pictures with her initials, BB – suited to the small dimensions of most of her work and perhaps also conveniently gender-neutral.

The Bristol Academy for the Promotion of Fine Arts opened a public exhibiting space in the spring of 1870, and Blanche exhibited regularly at its Winter Exhibition for the next twenty years. The choice of watercolour as Blanche's preferred medium and of landscape as her preferred genre was common among ‘lady artists’, but the Bristol Academy did have traditional links to ‘Bristol School’ landscape painters such as William Muller, Francis Danby, J. B. Pyne and John Syer – active in the early nineteenth century – whose Bristol Society of Artists it had incorporated. In 1876 Blanche was elected an Associate of the Bristol Academy.

Around this time her father ‘made the acquaintance of the wife of the Rev. Mr Wilkinson, on the death of whom he conceived the idea of marrying the widow, and communicated this fact to his family, who however were greatly opposed to the match.’ Nevertheless, the marriage to Mrs Gertrude Blanche Wilkinson, age 44, went ahead in April 1877. The extent to which the changed circumstances at Sneyd Park Villa may have prompted Blanche to move from Bristol is not known, but a brief item in the Western Daily Press of 17 January 1878 noted that ‘Miss Blanche Baker has retired from the committee of the Boys’ Home in consequence of having left Bristol.’

The second marriage of William Baker proved even more calamitous than the family had feared. Mrs Gertrude Blanche Baker, in her mid-forties, was an ‘exceedingly improper person, for she was addicted to drink’. She behaved in an ‘unbecoming and indecent way’, committing adultery with the Sneyd Park Villa coachman (Wheeler) and the carpenter (Owen). Newspaper accounts from 1880 explain that her behaviour brought about ‘insanity’ and the necessity for William to be ‘removed to a lunatic asylum’. The Baker siblings took the unusual, but understandable, step of forming a committee and filing for divorce on behalf of their father, who was deemed incapable of representing himself. With adultery having been proved, a decree nisi was issued in July 1880 and a final decree in March 1881. The family now had the possibility of holding on to some of William's assets.

Although Blanche was said to have left Bristol in 1878, at the time of the 1881 census she was living with her sister Laura on the farm adjacent to Sneyd Park Villa. However, a few years later she had moved to the outskirts of London – to Spring Cottage, Hanwell, Ealing, near where her father was living in a small private asylum, Wyke House, in Isleworth.

== Teaching ==
Blanche had apparently left Bristol to teach art in a London school, partly inspired by a collection of essays on education by the philosopher and social theorist Herbert Spencer. By coincidence, her sisters Rosa and Mabel Baker would be managing house for Spencer in the late 1880s and ‘we told him how the reading of this book [Education] by [Blanche] had induced her to take the post of art mistress in a London school, and had led to our leaving the country to join her in town.’ It may have been Spencer's ideas on what was later termed a ‘child-centred’ approach to education that resonated with Blanche. The earlier reference to her serving on the committee of a boys’ home seems to suggest social concern on her part and an awareness of the lack of opportunities for underprivileged children at this time before education had become nationally compulsory.

== Becoming established ==
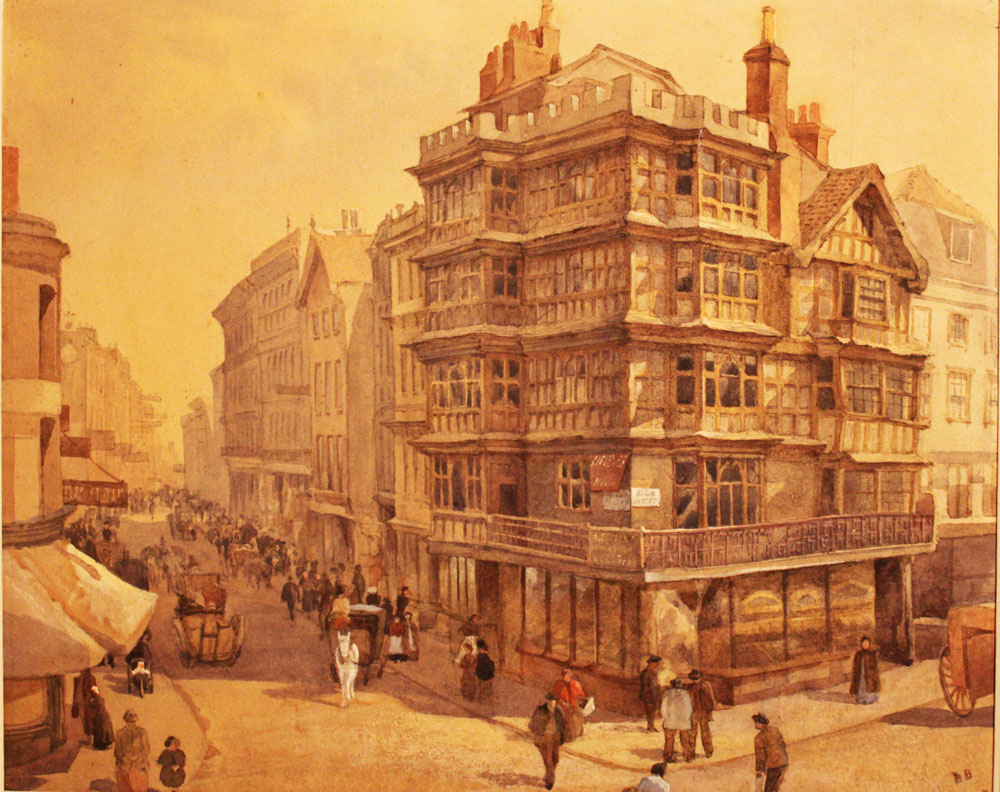
The Dutch House, Bristol exhibited in Bristol in 1885

Blanche's strength of personality and independence are further evidenced in an 1884 classified advertisement in The Times: ‘Sketching Tours – Miss Blanche Baker, an exhibitor at the Royal Academy, will give LESSONS to ladies travelling with her on the Thames during the months of July and August.’ Assuming that this enterprise went ahead, it was interrupted by her father's death on 16 August 1884. Blanche and her elder brother, Herbert Baker – who was now running their father's business at Canon's Marsh Steam Saw Mills – were the two executors of the will. When probate was finally settled later in the year, William Baker's personal estate was worth about £5,311 (equivalent to about £627,000 in 2017) with a resworn amount of £14,938 in November 1884 (about £1,690,000 in 2017). Sneyd Park Villa was advertised for sale in the following year.

In early 1885 Blanche exhibited at a ‘Loan Exhibition of Women’s Industries’ at Clifton, Bristol. Later in 1885 she had 11 watercolours in the Winter Exhibition of the Bristol Academy, ‘includ[ing] transcripts of quaint buildings The Dutch House, Bristol; Clovelly and Mary-le-Port Street, Bristol’.

In 1887 she exhibited three watercolours – Clovelly Pier, Clovelly and Bristol Streets – with the Society of Lady Artists (SLA) in London. The Society's purpose was ‘to gain acceptance for women artists by giving them the opportunity to exhibit their work. Membership was granted to women who had exhibited with the Society and who earned their livelihood through art.’ The Society's name changed to the more assertive Society of Women Artists in 1899.

Cabbages and The Thames from Streatley were exhibited at the Royal Academy in 1888, and by the end of the year Blanche had moved back to Bristol, living at Leworthy Lodge, Stoke Bishop. In the Winter Exhibition of the Bristol Academy ‘A Weedy Pond affords a glimpse of a retired spot, where the quiet beauty of nature has been well observed, and, modest in its dimensions, it is a most successful study.’ In the following year The Thames and The Float, Bristol were exhibited in London with the SLA, and in 1890 Summer and November and Back of the Old Home (perhaps a view of Sneyd Park Villa) were shown at the Royal Academy. That was also the year of a joint exhibition with the landscape painter Edward Wilkins Waite at Messrs Frost and Reed in Queens Road, Bristol. In the census of 1891 Blanche, 47, gave her profession as ‘artist – landscape painting and teacher’

== Home Life with Herbert Spencer ==
One might assume that the settlement of William Baker's estate would have left the members of his family ‘comfortably well off’, so it is somewhat surprising that Blanche's sisters Rosa and Mabel Baker (writing in 1906) reflected on 1889 as beginning as a year ‘of gloom and sadness to us … Misfortunes had come to us, as they come to so many, unforeseen and unsuspected, none the less hard to bear because they were not the first we had experienced.’ They make it clear that a significant aspect of their distress was through ‘money losses’.

In 1889 Herbert Spencer, now 69 and a controversial and much celebrated public figure, had grown tired of staying in lodging houses. ‘I have taken a house in St. John’s Wood and am going to have three maiden ladies to take care of me!’ he wrote to a friend. These ‘maiden ladies’ were initially Rosa and Mabel Baker – Blanche's older sister and a younger sister, although the reference to ‘three maiden ladies’ indicates that from the outset Blanche was to be part of the ‘arrangement’, brought about by a mutual friend, and by the time of the following year's Royal Academy Summer Exhibition she too was living at 64 Avenue Road, NW.

Some years after Spencer had died, Rosa and Mabel Baker – using the pseudonym ‘Two’ – published a memoir of their time with him: Home Life with Herbert Spencer. This is a warm portrait of Spencer, and also gives an insight into the relationship between the sisters:

[Blanche] had not seen us since our instalment in Avenue Road, and she was evidently surprised at the unexpected subjects that had already begun to interest us. We were talking of something we had just read in one of Mr. Spencer’s books, and quite innocently used one or two long words not formerly in our vocabulary. A look of awe appeared on our sister’s face, and then, as the discussion continued in the same strain, she slowly and gradually disappeared under the dining-room table.

Blanche's move to London saw her broadening her exhibition base: in 1893 The Only Customers and A Deserted Farmhouse were exhibited at the Royal Hibernian Academy of Arts in Dublin. In 1895 she exhibited A Cornish Roadside at a loan exhibition in Hampstead, and, maintaining her links with her home town, at Bristol Academy she showed ‘a little picture … a sketch of a thatched homestead and meadows. It is called The Home Fields and it is carefully worked, almost too careful; but very sunny and full of light.’ Blanche was elected an Associate of the Society of Lady Artists in 1894, and there was a further Bristol exhibition in 1896: ‘An attractive collection of watercolour drawings by Miss Blanche Baker, a Bristol lady, is on view at Messrs Frost and Reed Gallery, 47 Queens Road.’

Around 1894 Spencer, who was spending an increasing amount of time away from London, gave warning that he was planning to terminate the arrangement at 64 Avenue Road, but wrote warmly, ‘The remembrance of times spent with you and your sisters during 1889, ’90, ’91 and ’92 will always will always be pleasant to me.’ Despite this warning, however, Spencer did not act to evict the sisters until 1897, and by then he took a more negative view of their relationship. There were disagreements about expenses, and he complained that ‘the house is occupied by the [Baker] family, yourselves and relatives; and when I am home the social intercourse and the administration give the impression that 64, Avenue Road is the residence of the Misses [Baker] where Mr. Spencer resides when he is in town.’

== European travel and a family home ==
At some point after the sisters left Avenue Road in 1897 they moved to the northern outskirts of London, to Sneed Cottage, an eight-room house in Totteridge Lane, Whetstone, near Barnet. The name may have been an example of the Bakers’ self-deprecating humour – ‘Sneed’ was the local Bristol pronunciation of ‘Sneyd’. Having been brought up in the grander ‘Sneyd Park Villa’ of their youth, they now lived in Sneed Cottage.

Towards the end of the century Blanche broadened the subjects of her work as she travelled to Europe – France, Germany, Switzerland, northern Italy and Spain. Lake at Lucerne, for example, was exhibited with the Hampstead Art Society at the Conservatoire, Eton Avenue, in 1896.

In 1899 Blanche had a significant exhibition of 42 watercolours at the Modern Gallery, 175 Bond Street. Like the 1890 exhibition at Bristol, it was a joint exhibition with Edward Wilkins Waite. Some of the titles suggest higher ambitions than her usual parochial subjects: ‘Where skies make azure of our earth-born greys’ commands her highest asking price, of 15 guineas, and ‘Where cattle tread the soaking soil’ is 10 guineas – both prices a step up from the 8 or 9 guineas that are usually listed for her Royal Academy works. There were a number of views of Switzerland, including the dramatic alpine summit The Jungfrau. England was represented by works depicting Norfolk, Cambridgeshire, Guildford, Somerset and Yorkshire. Some titles – such as Blackberry Gatherers and The Bean Gatherer – suggest more of a human presence than was usual in her work. There were also four flower studies: Roses, Murillos, Tulips and Freesia.

== Into the twentieth century ==
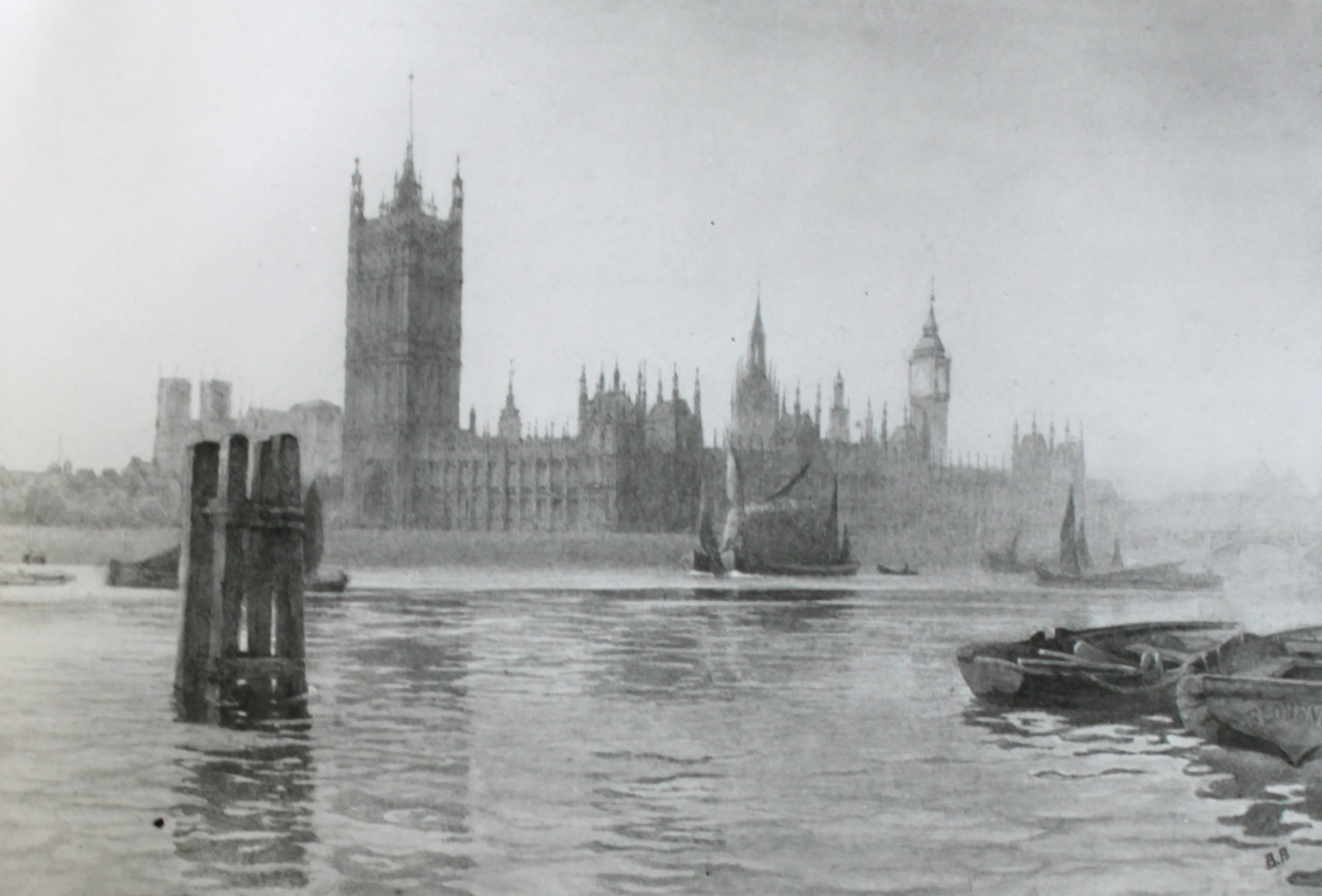
The Houses of Parliament from Lambeth Bridge, black and white reproduction of a watercolour by Blanche Baker c.1900

The 1901 census provides a snapshot of life in the Baker sisters’ new home. Blanche's sister Mabel, 39, was the ‘head of the household’. She was an ‘examiner of domestic economy’ in a school. Blanche, 56, was described as ‘an artist (painter) and Teacher of Drawing. School’. They lived with their sister Rosa, 60, and their brother William, 41, who was a clerk at the Stock Exchange. They were supported by one domestic servant living in.

In the summer of that year The Forester’s Garden was selected for the Royal Academy, and in the following year Blanche was elected to be a full member of the Bristol Academy. Further European travel is evidenced in another West End exhibition, in February 1904, this time at McQueen's Gallery, where she showed 30 watercolours in a joint exhibition with Margaret Kemp-Welch. This exhibition included nine views of Venice and three views of the French Alps near Mont Blanc.

Also in February 1904, at Walker's Gallery, New Bond Street, there was an ‘inaugural' exhibition of the Camsix Art Club. Initially this was a group of seven women artists who took their name from the Essex farmstead where the artist Bertram Priestman ran a summer school which they attended. It is likely that Blanche Baker contributed to that exhibition, and she certainly exhibited with the Camsix the following year at Alpine Club Hall, in 1907 at the Modern Gallery, in 1908 at the Goupil Gallery and in 1911 at the Baillie Gallery.

From My Window was selected for the Royal Academy in 1910 and A Cherry Orchard the following year. In the 1911 census, Blanche, now 66, described herself as ‘artist and teacher. Secondary school’ – suggesting that education was a significant part of her identity. By now the sisters’ younger brother, William, was no longer living with them at Sneed Cottage.

== Later years ==
By 1918 the Baker sisters were living in a different property in Whetstone – in the High Road – which they also called Sneed Cottage. One of the last of Blanche's works for which there are records was a commission in about 1923 to create a miniature version (4.5 cm x 3.1 cm) of her c.1899 alpine watercolour The Jungfrau for Queen Mary's Dolls' House (currently in the Royal Collection). Queen Mary – as the Princess of Wales – had visited a Camsix exhibition at the Goupil Gallery in 1908.

Sometime after Rosa died, in December 1925, Blanche and Mabel Baker moved to Fareham, near Portsmouth. Blanche died at Belmont Nursing Home, Alverstoke, Hampshire, on 12 December 1929, aged 85 years. Mabel was executor of her estate, valued at £1,907 13s. 6d.
