= Old Council House, Bristol =

Municipal building in Bristol, England

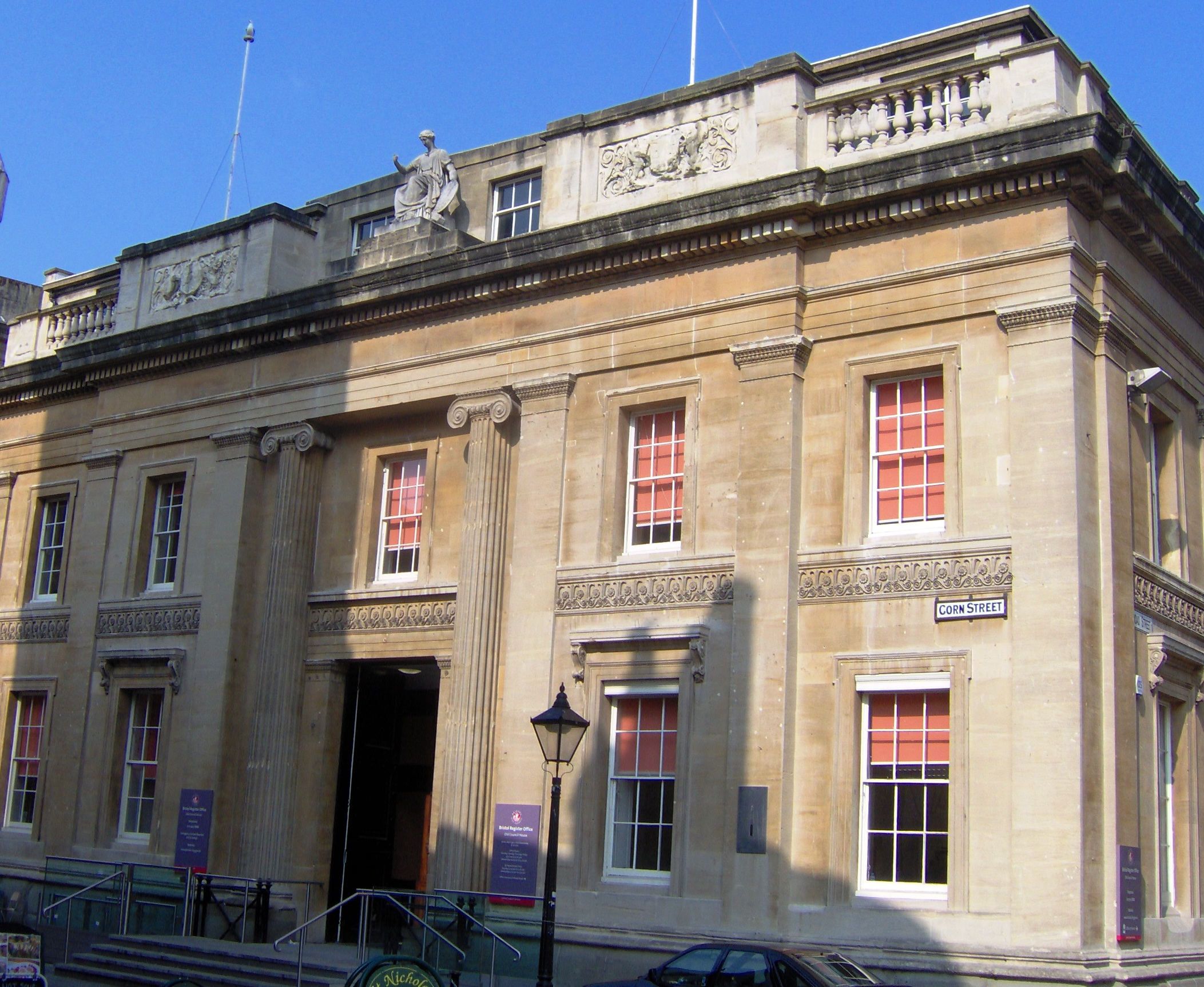
- Old Council House in 2007

- Location within Bristol

General information
- Architectural style: Neoclassical
- Location: Corn Street, Bristol, England
- Coordinates: 51.4550°N 2.5935°W
- Year built: 1827

Design and construction
- Architect: Sir Robert Smirke

Listed Building – Grade II*
- Official name: The Old Council House and attached front gates
- Designated: 8 January 1959
- Reference no.: 1207433

The Old Council House is a municipal building on Corn Street in Bristol, England. It has been designated by English Heritage as a Grade II* listed building.

== History ==
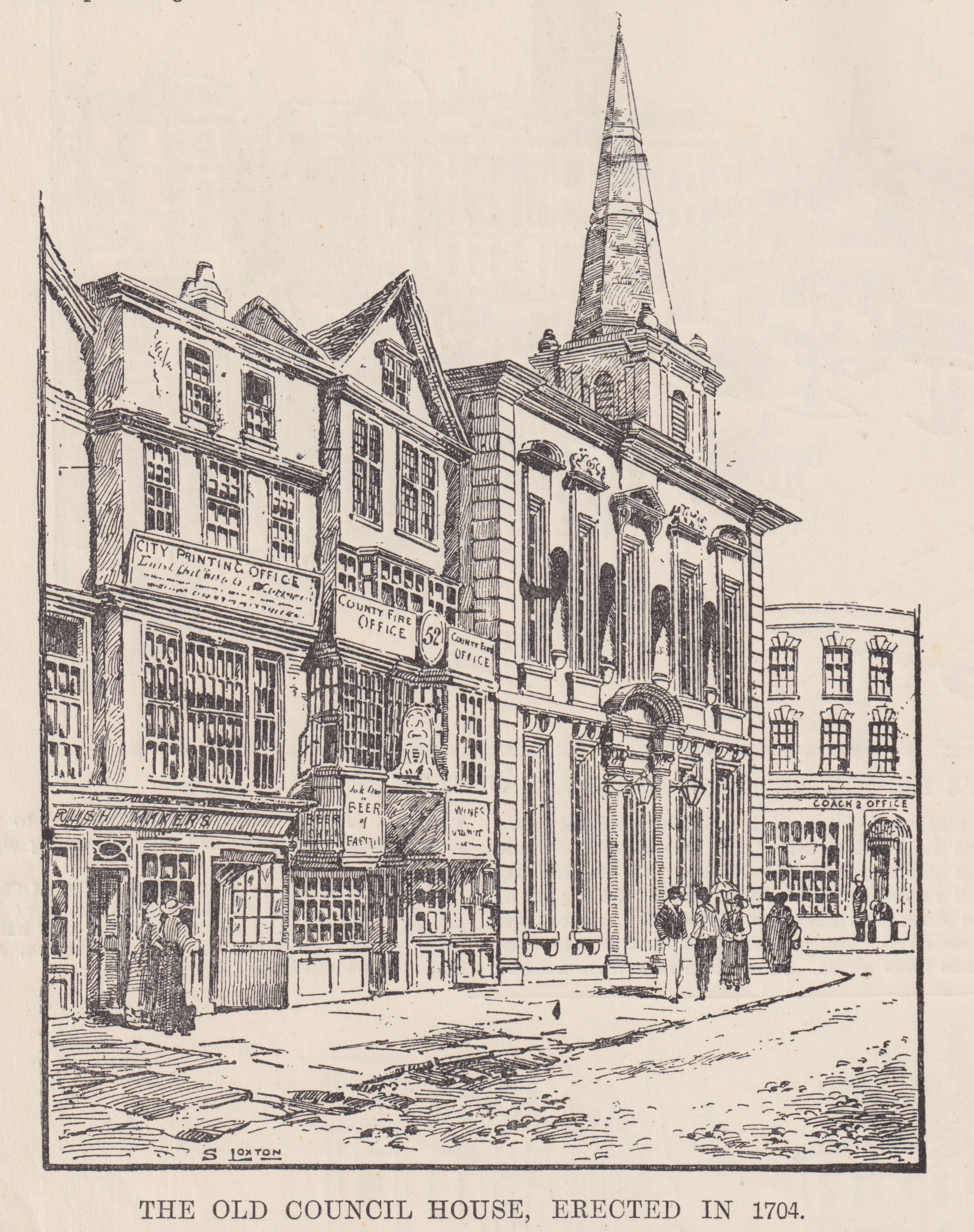
Old Council House, Bristol, erected 1704

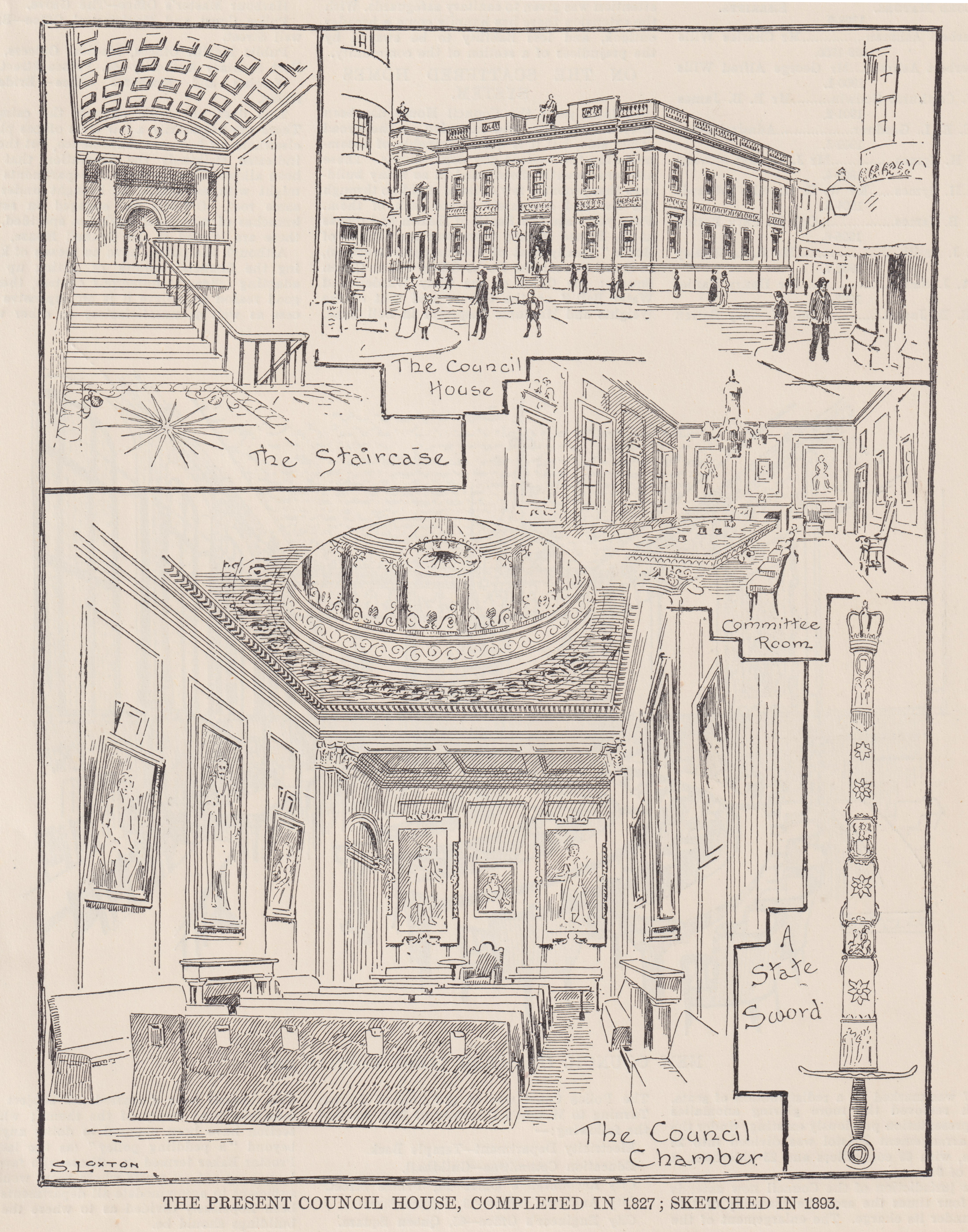
Council House erected in 1827, sketched in 1893

The site selected for the current building had previously been occupied by three buildings: a medieval council house, St Ewen's Church and the Chapel of the Fraternity of St John the Baptist (also known as the Tolzey). The Chapel of the Fraternity of St John the Baptist was demolished in the late 17th century, allowing an enlarged council house to be rebuilt in the Classical style and completed in 1704. St Ewen's Church was demolished in 1791 and the council house of 1704 and two adjacent properties were demolished in the early 19th century to allow the present building to be constructed.

The present building, which was designed by Sir Robert Smirke in a neoclassical style, was built between 1824 and 1827. The design for the main frontage consisted of five bays with two large Ionic order columns on either side of the entrance. A statue of Justice designed by Edward Hodges Baily was erected on the parapet above the entrance. The interior design for the original section included a large sweeping staircase.

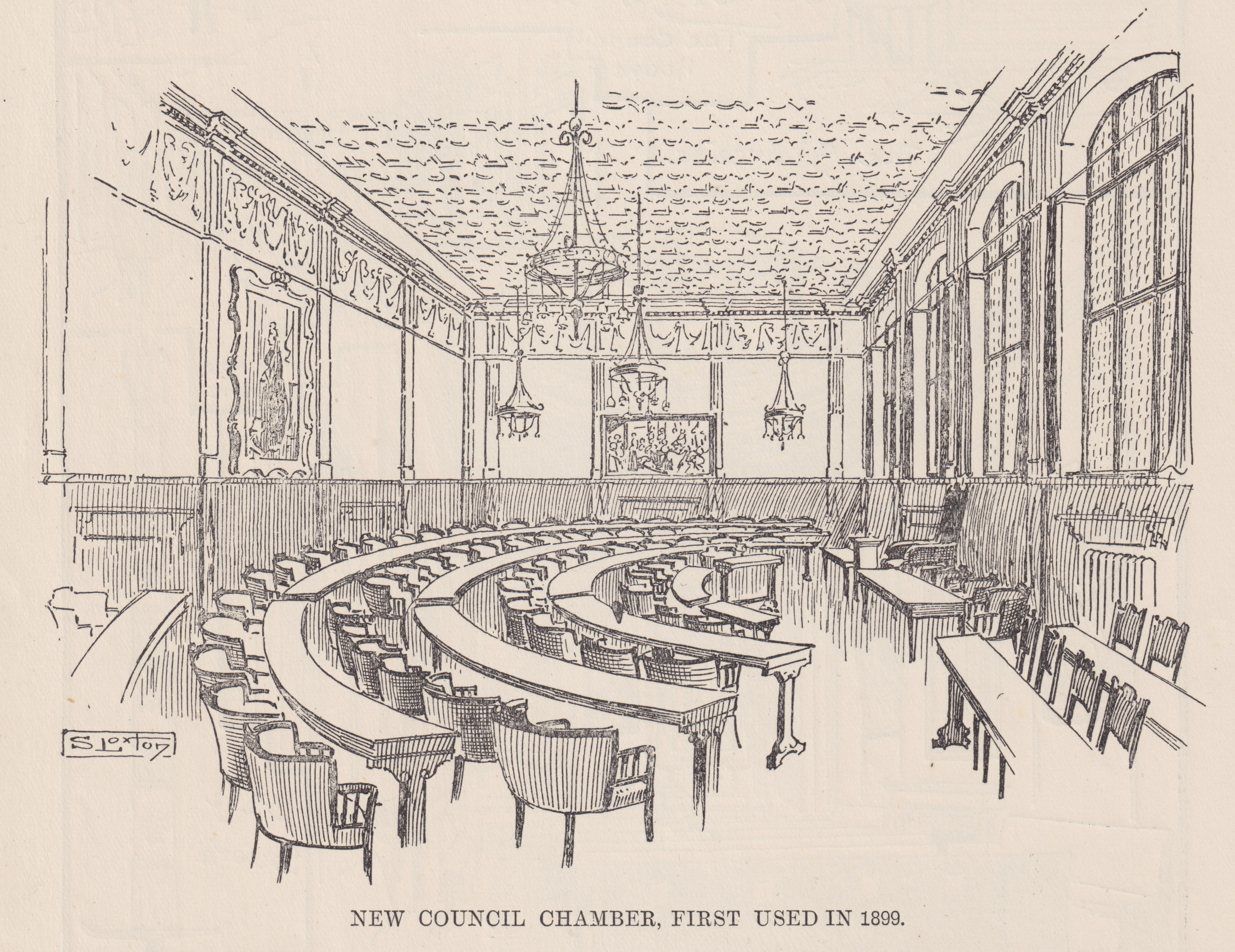
Council House Chamber, first used in 1899

The Council House was extended to the south-west to a design by Richard Shackleton Pope and George Dymond in order to accommodate magistrates courts in 1828–92; this involved demolishing two further properties on Corn Street, the basements of which were reused as holding cells for prisoners. The building was extended again, this time to the north-west, to create a Council Chamber, large enough to accommodate up to 150 people, which was officially opened by Queen Victoria on 12 November 1899. She knighted the Lord Mayor, Herbert Ashman, during her visit.

By the 1930s, the Council House was too small for regular use, and a new site on College Green was proposed: construction began in late 1936 but the works were delayed until after the Second World War, and Bristol City Council was not able to move out to their new premises until 1956.

The old Council House continues to be used as a local register office for registering births, deaths, marriages, civil partnerships and citizenship. Important works of art in the building include a portrait of Queen Anne, painted by the school of Godfrey Kneller in c. 1703, a portrait of George II, painted by the school of Charles Jervas in c. 1732 and a portrait of Queen Caroline, also painted by the school of Jervas in c. 1732.

== See also ==
- Grade II* listed buildings in Bristol
