= The Bush, Bristol =

The Bush
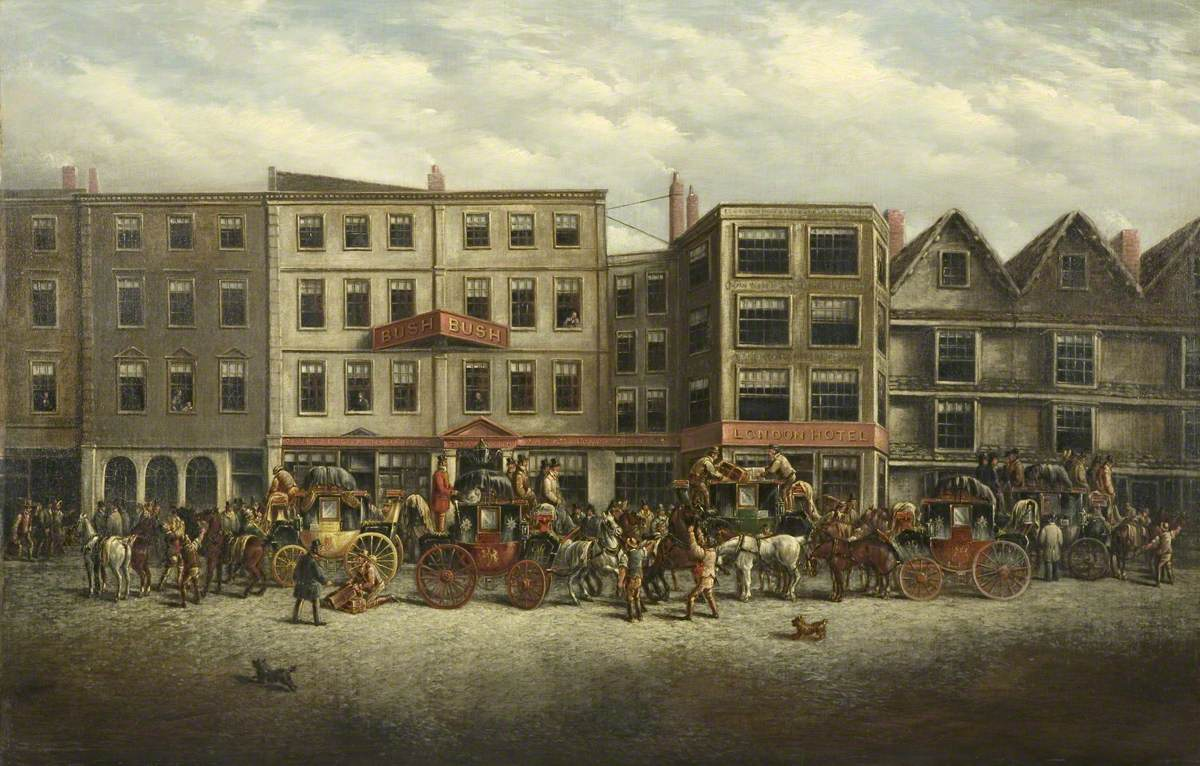
- The Bush Inn, c,1790

- Location within Bristol
- 51°27′17″N 2°35′37″W
- Type: Coaching inn
- Location: 55 Corn Street, Bristol

Site notes
- Area: Bristol
- Owner: Harbour Hotels

The Bush (Bush Inn, Bush Hotel, Bush Tavern) was one of the best-known coaching inns in 18th-19th century England, featuring in Charles Dicken's 1837 novel, The Pickwick Papers. The site was developed in the 1850s as a bank, which is now a Grade II* Listed Building. The former bank is now part of The Harbour Hotel, Bristol.

== History ==
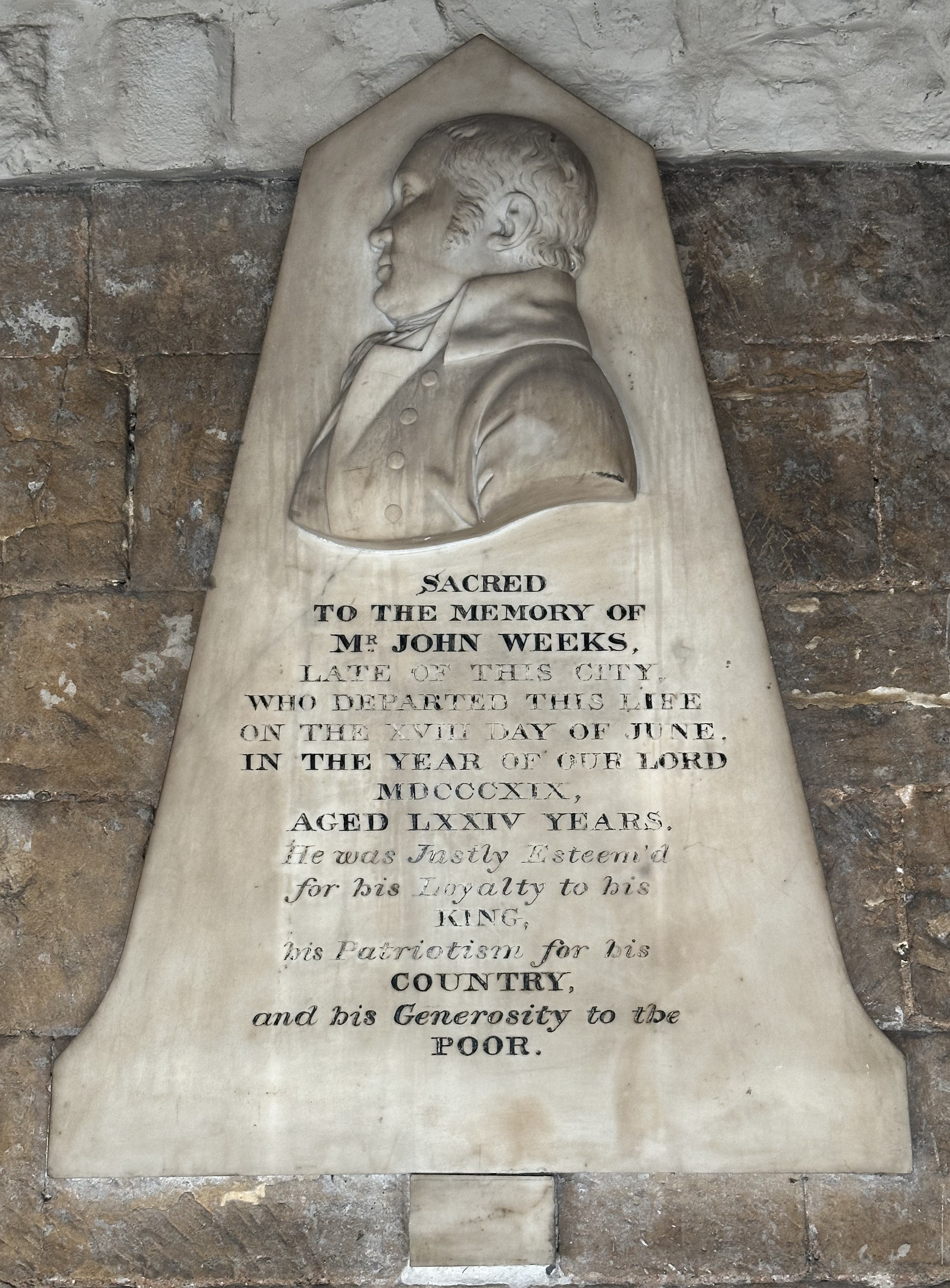
John Weeks memorial, Bristol Cathedral

It seems likely there was an inn on the site by the 1660s, when a property with twelve hearths was recorded there. By 1730, the Bush was well enough established to be the base for the Whig 'Union Club'. The inn first came to prominence, however, after 1773, when John Weeks took over the business from his father-in-law. Weeks turned the Bush into one of England's most innovative coaching inns, noted for its express coach services. By 1776 he was offering a 'Flying Post Chaise' service on the 120-mile Bristol-London run that took just 16 hours, while also providing same-day services to Birmingham, Oxford and Exeter. The fastest stagecoaches on all these routes had previously taken two days. By the 1790s the Bush was Bristol's premier coaching inn.

Weeks established a national reputation as a victualler, famed for his turtle soup and his ability to cater for large events. His practice of providing free or heavily subsided feasts, especially at Christmas or to celebrate Britain's military victories, further enhanced his reputation and that of The Bush. Some of these celebrations were accompanied by extravagant processions held outside the inn, similar to 'chairing' events following elections. Weeks' willingness to provided free or very cheap meals to the poor during economic crises, such as the dearth of 1801, made him a popular figure for Bristol's working classes.

The Bush incorporated a stage-coach office, an inn / hotel for travellers, the 'Bush Tavern' (providing meals, wine and sprits) and a coffee house called 'Jacks'. Jacks' became the city's leading coffee house and from 1789 also functioned as an informal sale room, where merchants and other businessmen transacted their business.

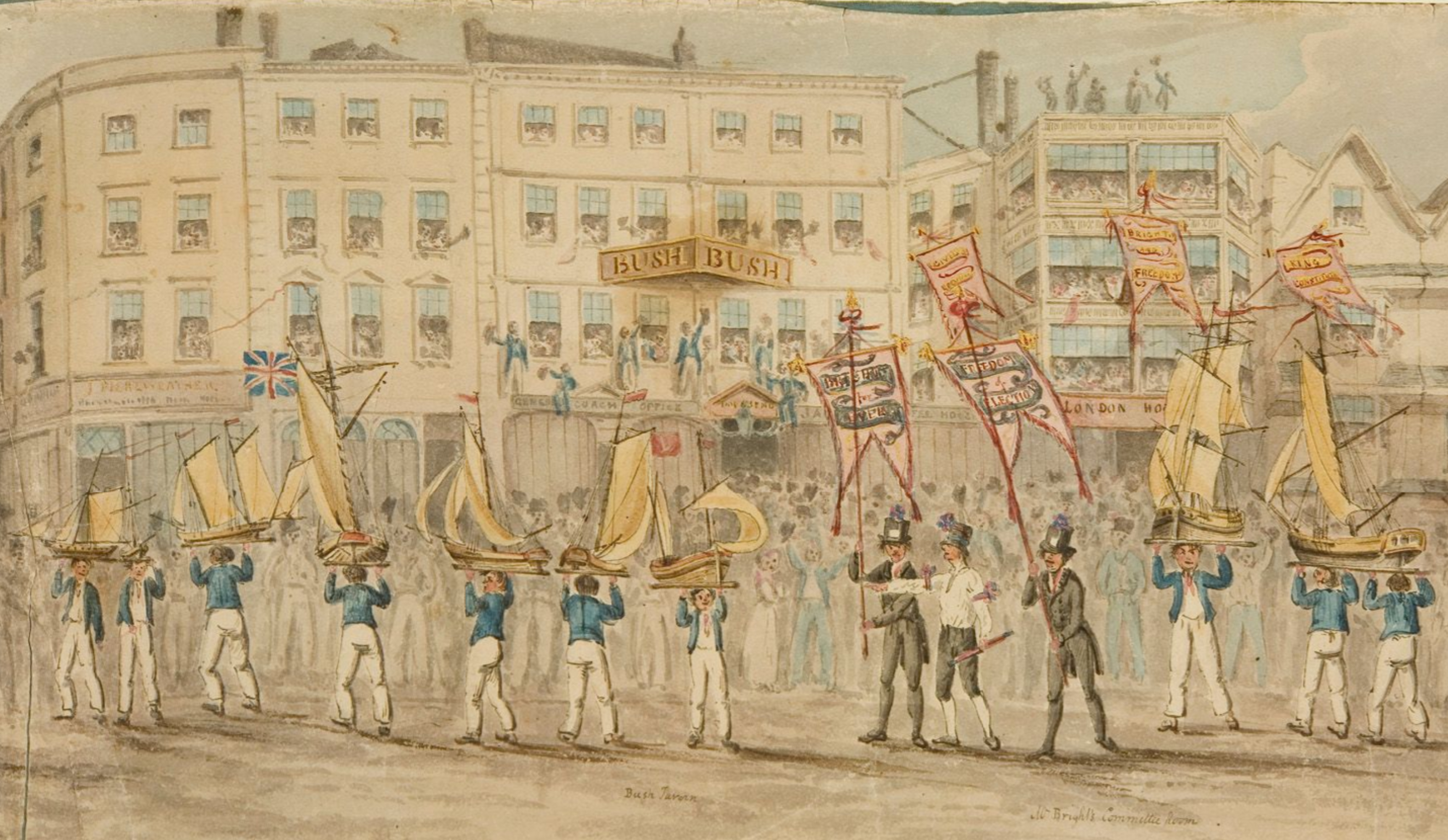
The Chairing of Henry Bright, 1820. Procession passing The Bush

In the eighteenth century the Bush was frequently used as the base for Bristol clubs, societies and political parties. From at least 1730, The Bush was the base for the Whigs's 'Union Club', in opposition to the Tory 'Steadfast Society (later 'White Lion Club'), located around the corner at the White Lion (Grand Hotel) on Broad Street. During heavily contested general elections, such as those of 1826 and 1830, the inns were sometimes ransacked by rival parties.

The development of the railways from the 1840s led to the demise of many of Britain's traditional coaching inns, including the Bush. Its coach office closed on 30 March 1844 along with the inn and tavern. By 1851 'Bush Chambers' on Corn Street was occupied by a number of different businesses, including insurance offices, legal firms, Bristol Stock Exchange and a wine merchant. In 1854 the directors of The West of England and South Wales District Banking Company 'purchased and demolished the once great coaching hostelry', along with some adjacent properties. They then built a grand new bank in the Venetian style. This later became a branch of Lloyds Bank, with the building being listed for its architectural significance in 1959. The old bank is now part of the Harbour Hotel, Bristol.

Site of the Bush today

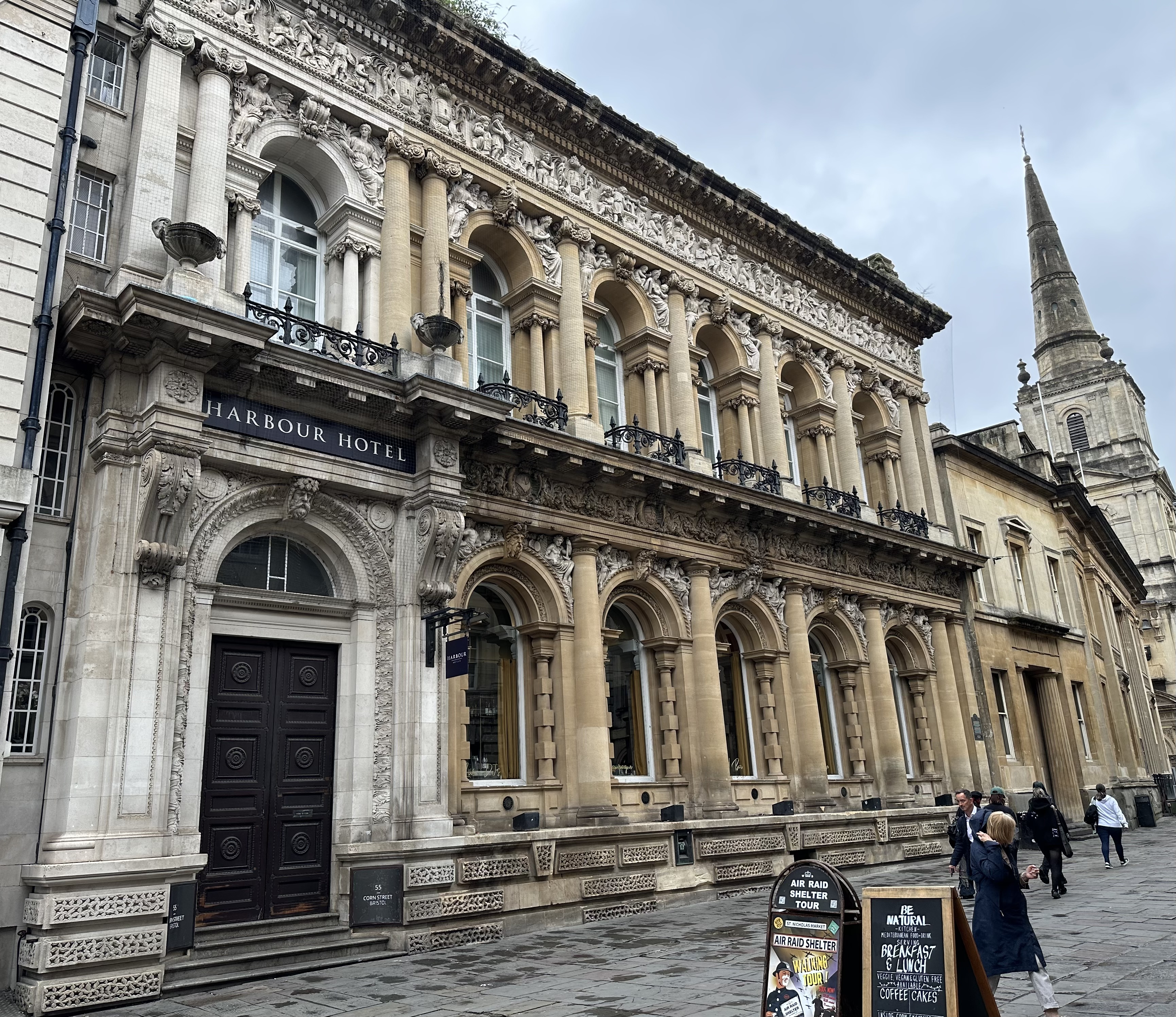
Harbour Hotel 2026 (site of the Bush)

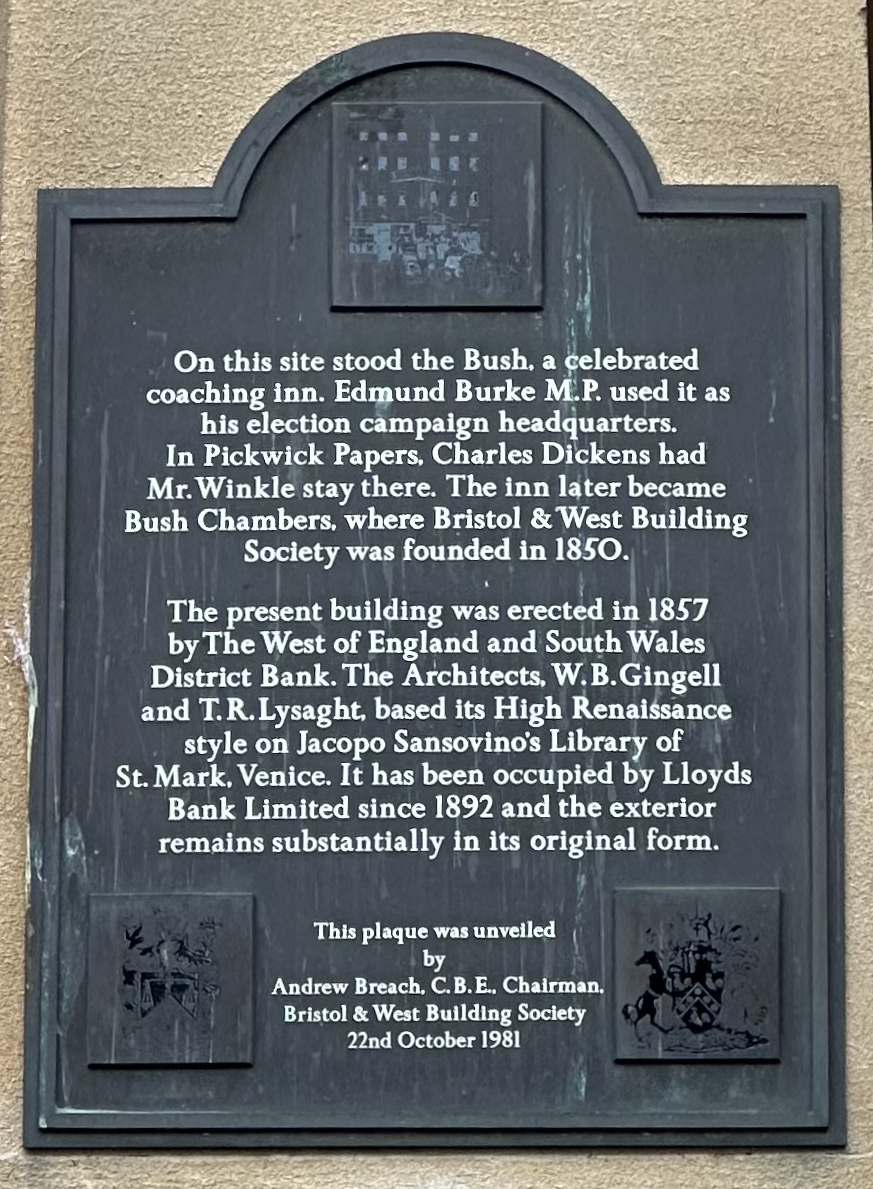
1981 plaque commemorating The Bush

== The Bush in popular culture ==
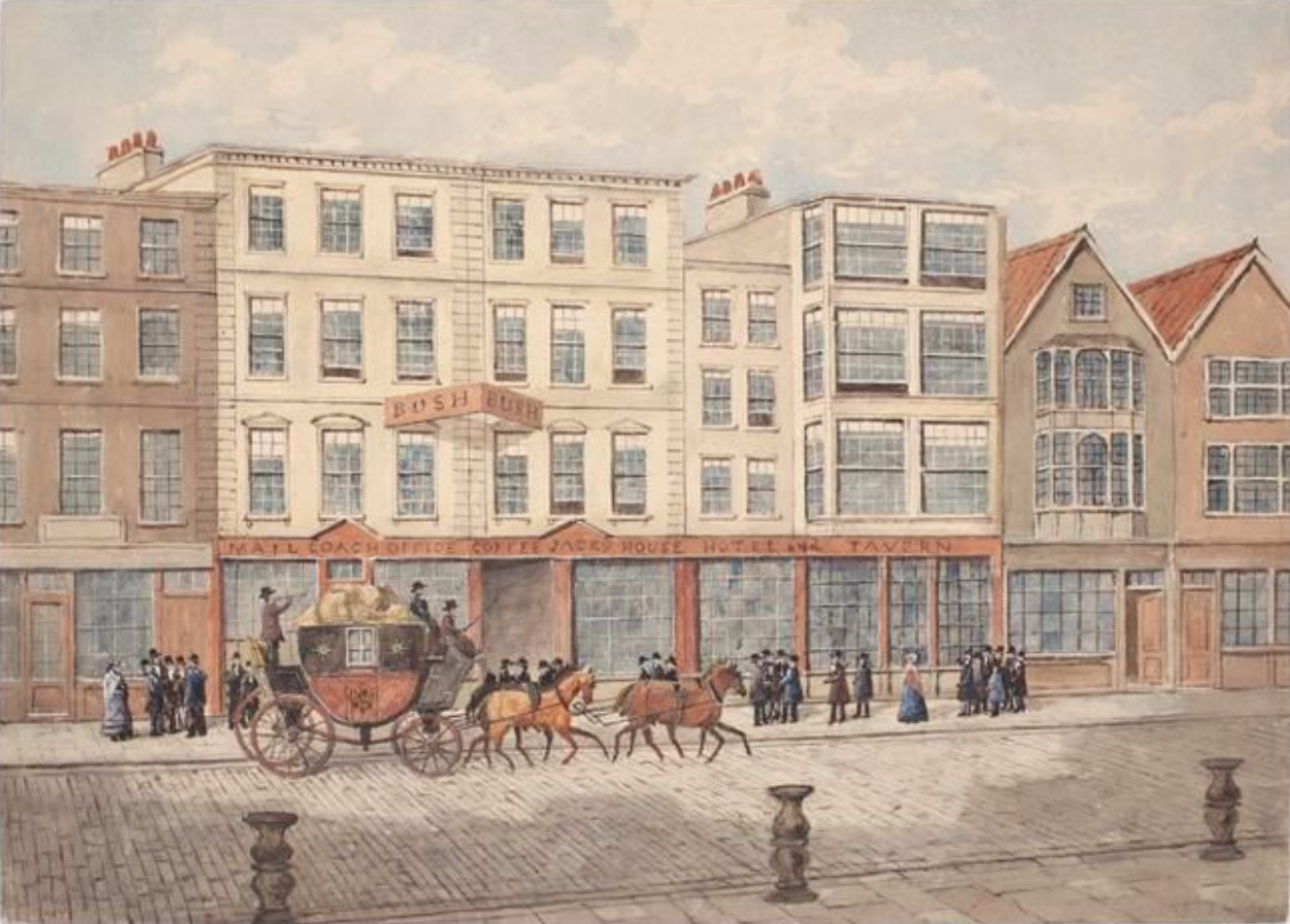
Reconstruction of The Bush in its heyday (painting c.1880)

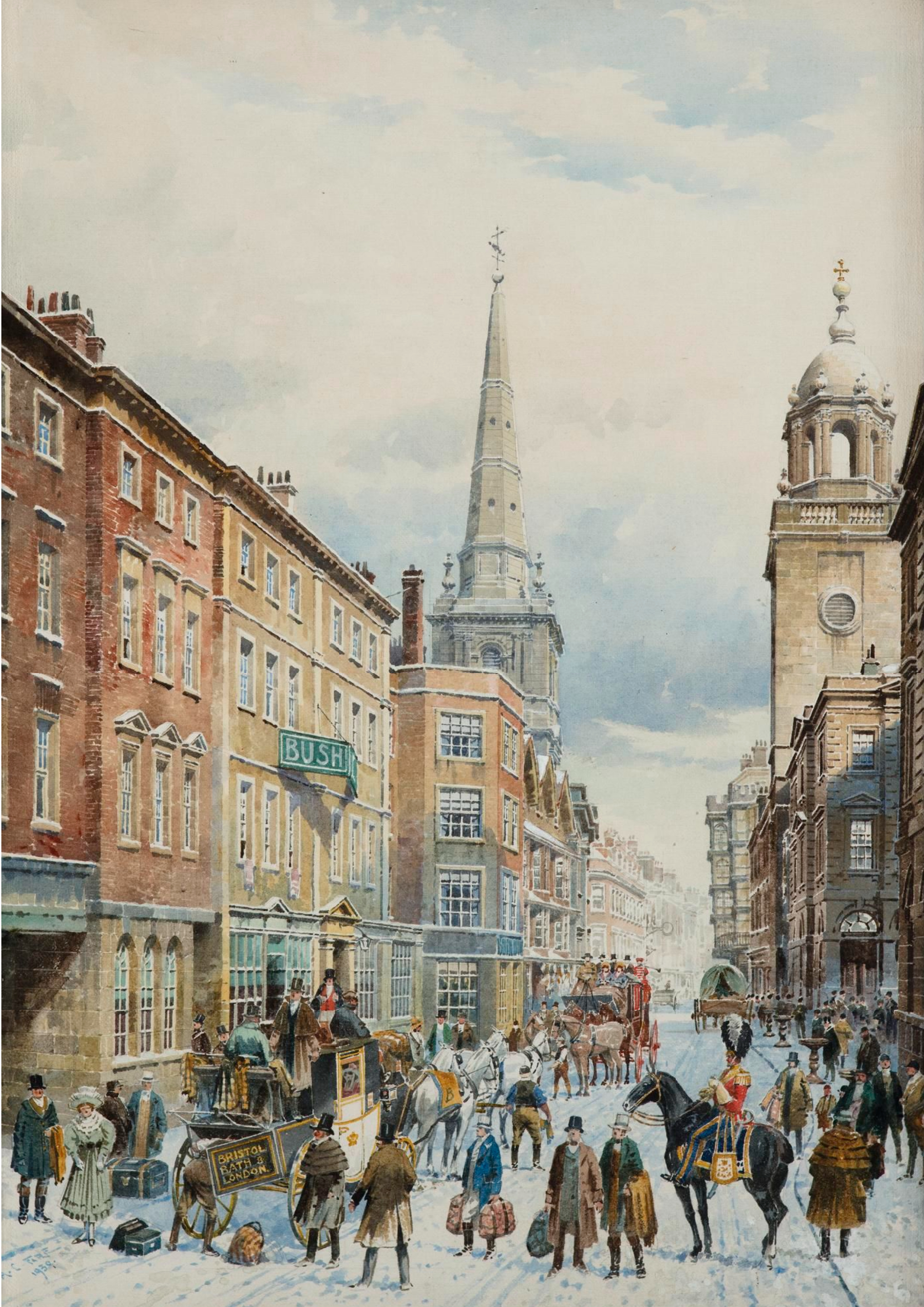
Romanticised depiction of The Bush, as painted in 1930

From the late eighteenth century, the Bush developed a reputation that extended beyond Bristol. Its' kitchens catered for George IV when still Prince Regent, while the generosity of John Weeks at the time of his Christmas feasts was cited in London journals in 1788.

Charles Dickens stayed at the Bush in May 1835 while reporting on a Bristol election. Dickens then used it as the setting for part of his bestselling first novel The Pickwick Papers (1837).

The inn continued to be discussed and illustrated in Bristol well into the twentieth century, with a number of artists featuring it in reconstructions of old Bristol.

In 1982 the Bristol & West Building Society unveiled a plaque on the property, commemorating the historic inn.
