= George Dymond =

British architect (c.1797–1835)

- Born: c. 1797
- Died: 29 August 1835; Castle Green, Bristol, England
- Occupation: Architect
- Buildings: Higher Market, Exeter

George Dymond (c. 1797 – 29 August 1835) was a British architect working mainly in Bristol.

== List of works ==
- Magistrates’ Court, Old Council House, Corn Street (1829), with Richard Shackleton Pope
- Higher Market, Exeter (1835), completed by Charles Fowler
