= Corn Street, Bristol =

Street in England

Coordinates: 51°27′14″N 2°35′46″W

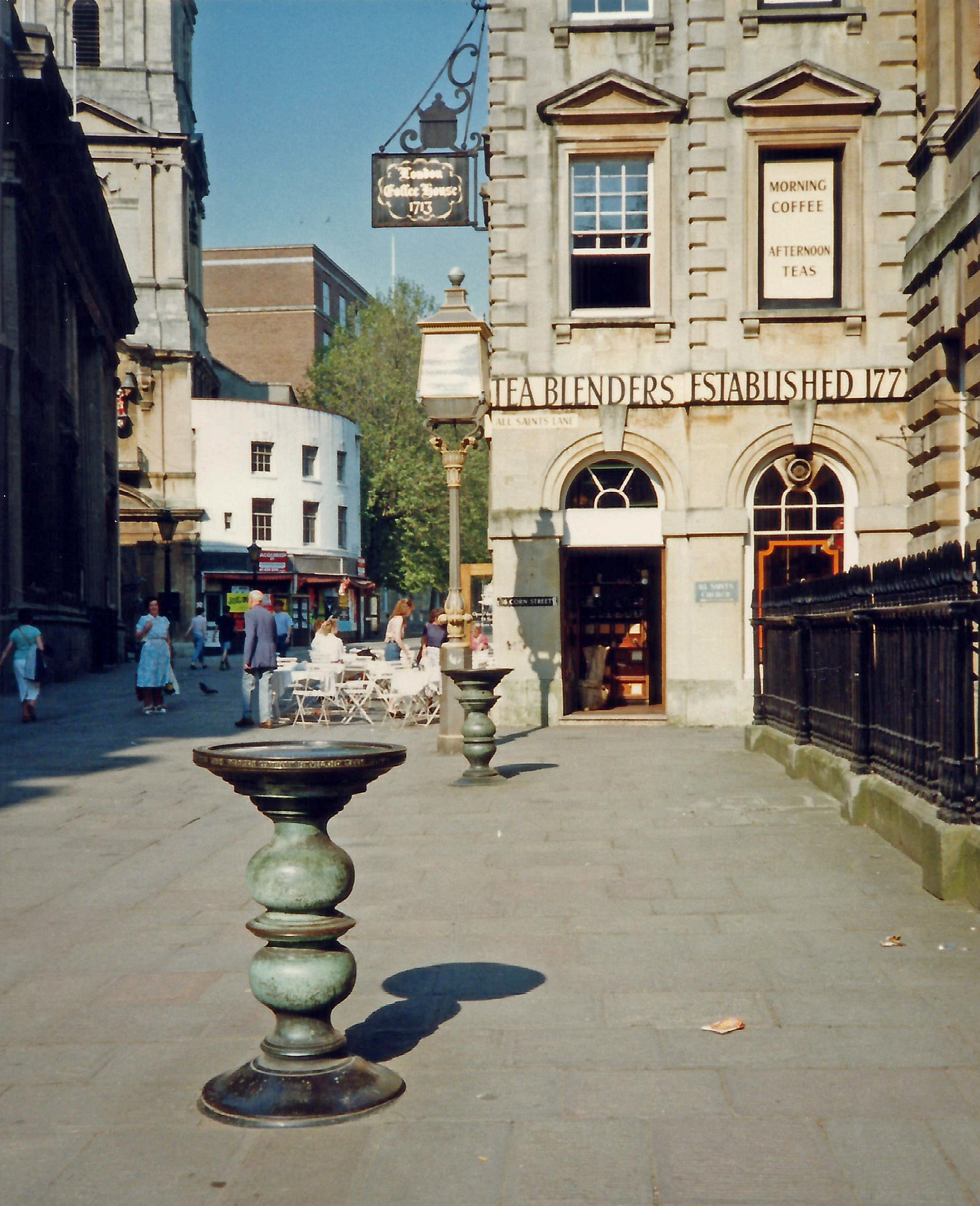
- Corn Street, looking towards its crossroads with Broad Street, Wine Street and High Street. The Exchange is on the right.

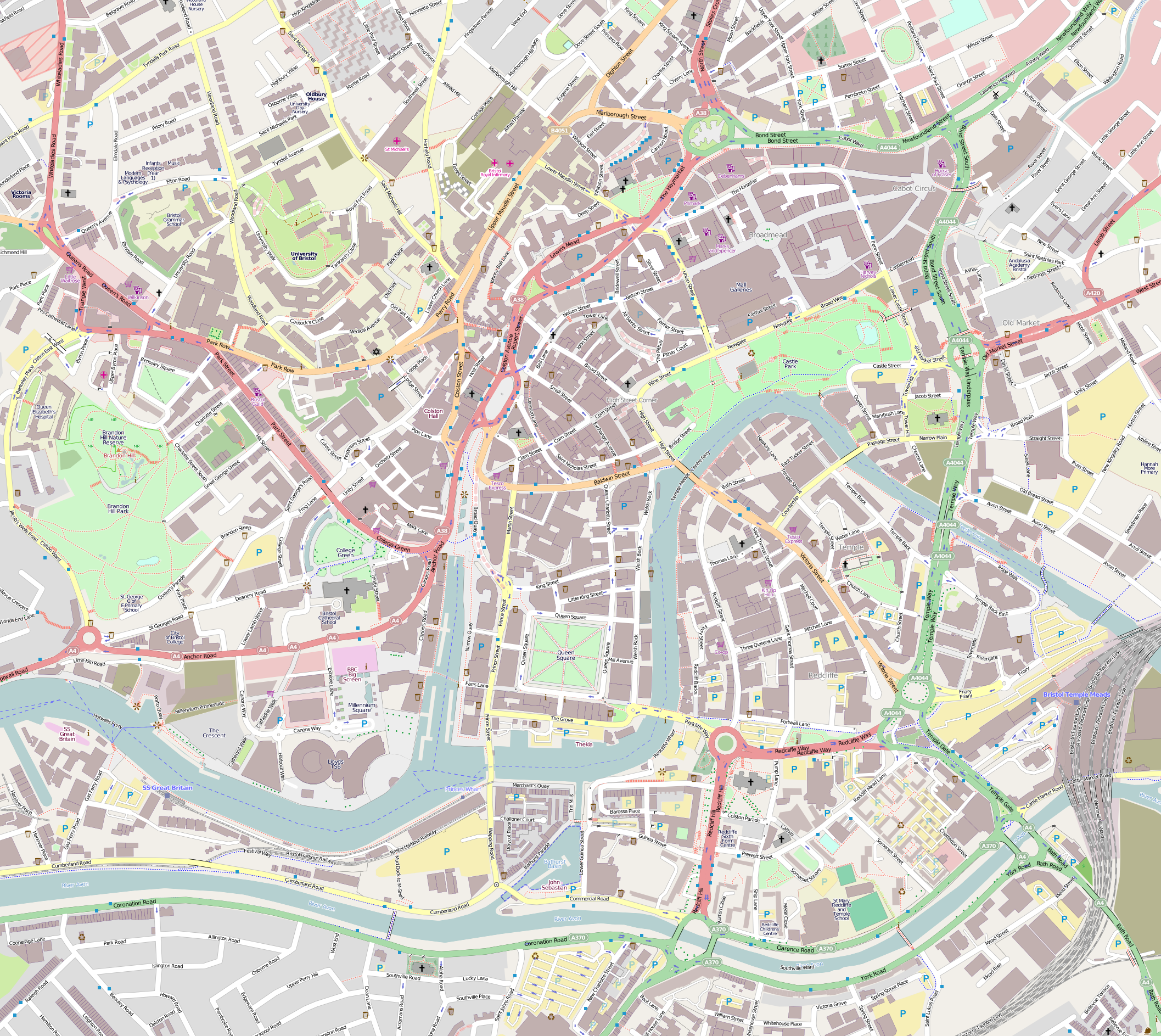
- Location within Bristol Central
- Maintained by: Bristol City Council
- Location: Bristol, England
- Postal code: BS1
- North: Broad Street
- East: Wine Street
- South: High Street
- West: Clare Street

Corn Street, together with Broad Street, Wine Street and High Street, is one of the four cross streets which met at the Bristol High Cross, the heart of Bristol, England when it was a walled medieval town. From this crossroads Corn Street and its later extension Clare Street runs downhill approximately 325m south-westwards to The Centre.

Corn Street contains many historic buildings. For centuries it was at the centre of Bristol's commerce and administration, but in recent years has increasingly turned to market shopping, leisure and accommodation.

== History ==
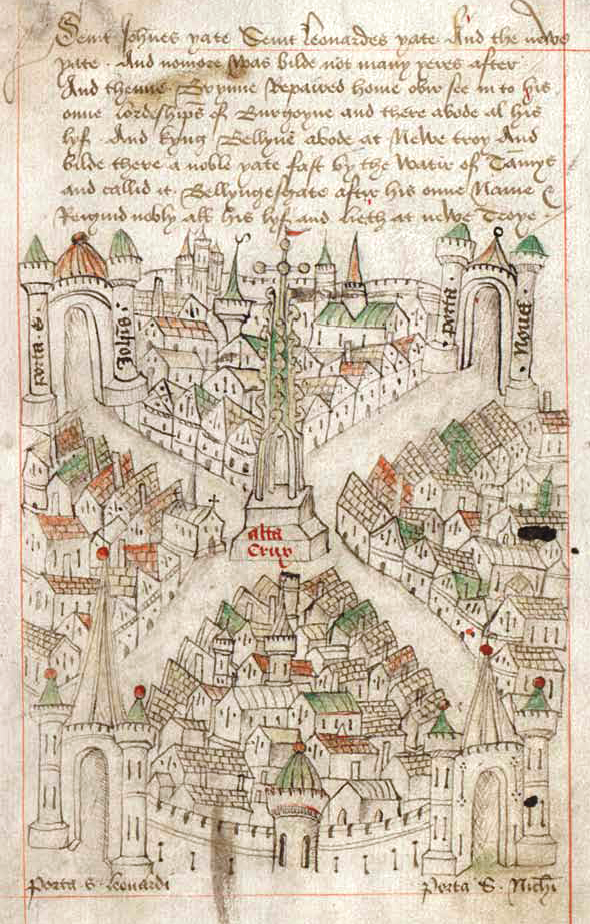
Robert Ricart's map of Bristol in 1479. Corn Street is shown running south-west from the High Cross (Alta Crux)

Corn Street, together with Broad Street, Wine Street and High Street, formed the earliest nucleus of Bristol. Ricart's Plan of 1479, one of the first English town plans, shows Corn Street with the High Cross at one end and St Leonard's Gate at the other. The other three cross streets are also shown, each ending at their own gate in the city wall.

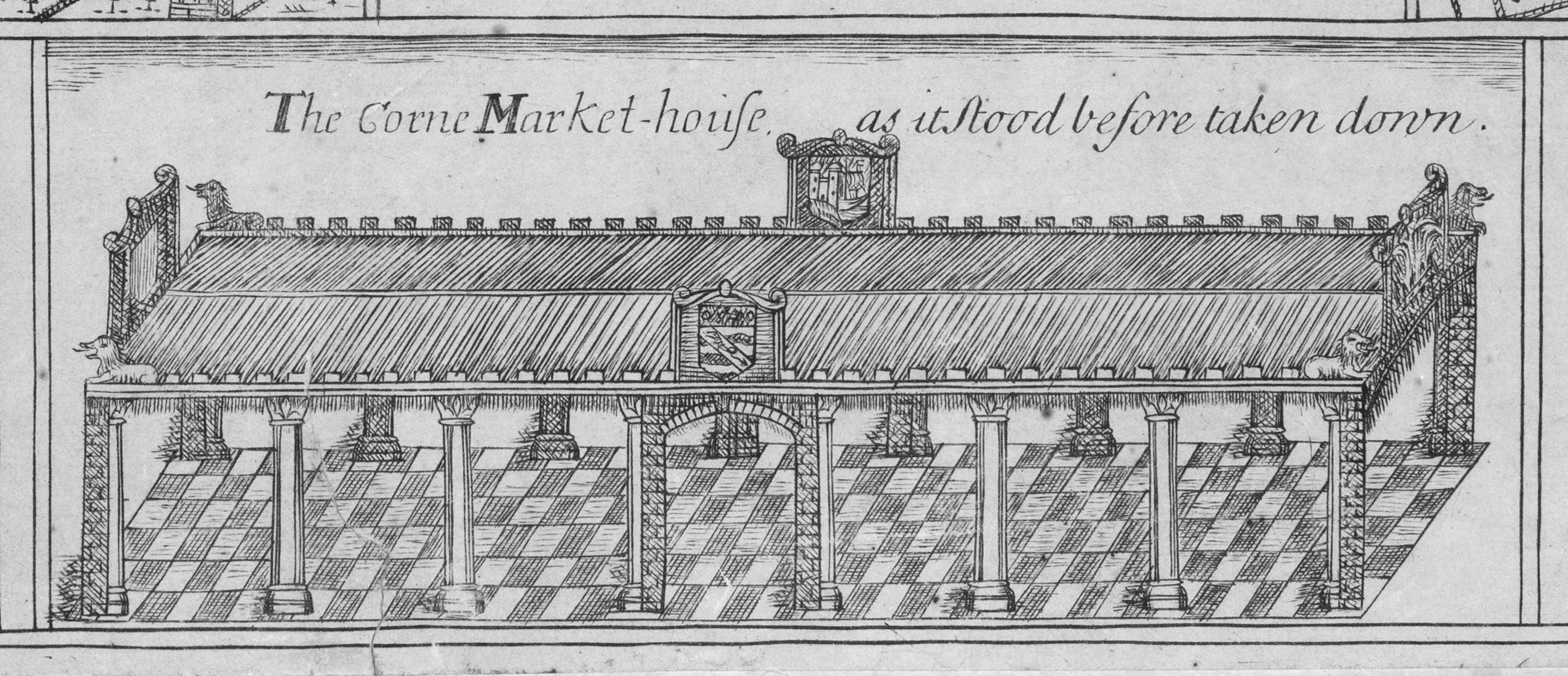
Original Caption: 'The Corne Market-house as it stood before taken down'

The origins of the name Corn Street are uncertain, but the simplest explanation – that corn was traded here – appears to be the most likely. A Corn Market was held in The Exchange from 1813, but as the street was known as Old Corn Street at the beginning of the 13th century it seems that corn was bought and sold here from the street's earliest history. However, the Corn Market was not always located on Corn Street. The earliest detailed depiction of the city's corn market is that found in James Millerd's map, first published in 1673 and updated to the 1730s. The seventeenth century Corn Market was located on Wine Street, about 50 metres east of the High Cross, while its 1684 replacement was located on The Key.

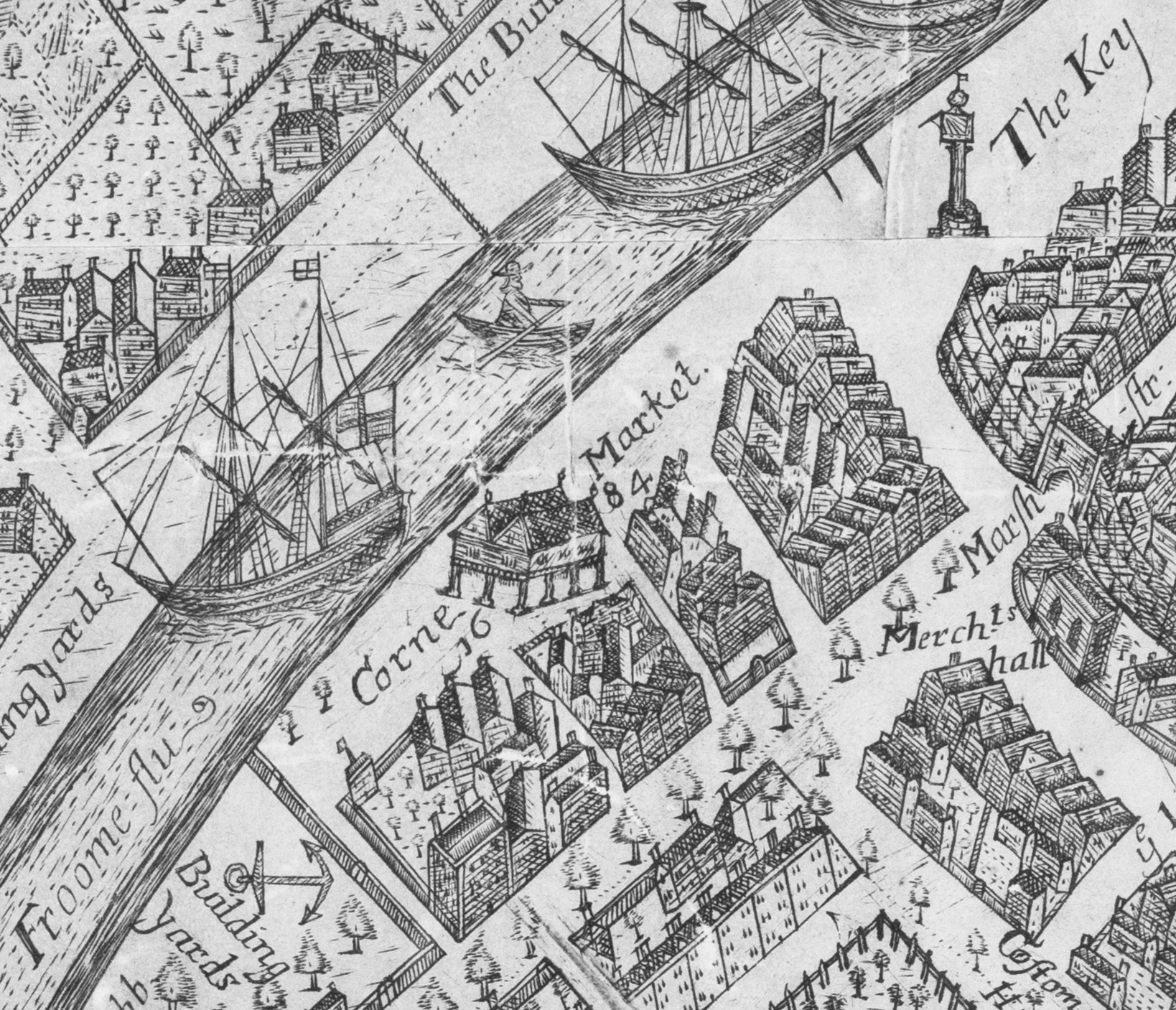

=== Commerce and banking ===
Corn Street was a centre of trade from the 13th century, and at the heart of Bristol's banking business from the 18th century. A 'Merchants' Tolzey' or 'Tolsey', a meeting place or exchange where commercial business was done, was built alongside All Saints' Church soon after 1550. Between the columns of this colonnade were sited nine brass tables known as 'nails', mostly dated between 1625 and 1631. Four of these were moved to their current location in front of The Exchange when the Merchants' Tolzey was taken down in 1782 and a wing of The Exchange built on the site. The popular belief that the phrase 'to pay on the nail' or 'cash on the nail' derives from Bristol merchants settling deals on these tables is untrue: the origin of the phrase predates the Bristol Nails by centuries. Nonetheless tourist guides continue to keep the story alive.

The Exchange was a business centre incorporating a coffee house, a tavern, a number of business houses and even a barber's shop. In 1813, alterations were made to John Wood the Elder's original designs when it became the Corn Exchange, and in 1872 the central courtyard was covered over. This roof was replaced at a lower level in 1949.

The Commercial Rooms, founded in 1810 at No.43 Corn Street, was a Gentlemen's Club for mercantile interests; its first President was John Loudon McAdam. A weather vane indicator, still in place, advised on the arrival of shipping.

In the early 18th century Bristol Corporation's banking business was looked after, as was common at the time, by a goldsmith: John Vaughan, the father of Bristol banking, did business in the Dutch House which stood on corner of High Street and Wine Street opposite the Old Council House. In 1750 the Bristol Bank, the first full banking partnership in Bristol, opened at 42 Broad Street. This became known as the Old Bank when Miles Bank opened in 1752; in 1776 it moved to Clare Street and then in 1798 it moved to what became 35 Corn Street. Other banks followed; Harford Bank started in Small Street in 1769 but moved to Corn Street in 1799; Bristol City Bank was established in Exchange Buildings, All Saints Passage in 1794; the National Provincial Bank, later to become part of the RBS group, moved to 31 Corn Street in 1863. Stuckey's Bank started on Broad Quay, moved to John Vaughan's old premises at the Dutch House, and finally succumbed to the lure of Corn Street by moving there in 1854. In 1857 the West of England and South Wales District Bank built its headquarters, based on St Mark's Library in Venice, at 55 Corn Street; this was the site of The Bush coaching inn where the meeting at which the bank was instituted had been held 23 years earlier. This bank collapsed in 1878, and its premises were eventually taken by Lloyds. In the 20th century, further banks set up branches or city offices on Corn Street: Martins Bank opened at 47 Corn Street in 1938, whilst Coutts Bank came to 38 Corn Street in 1977.

=== Administration ===
The first Council House was built in 1552 on the site of the Chapel of St John, part of St Ewen's Church, near the corner of Corn Street and Broad Street. This consisted of the Tolzey (or Mayor's Tolzey), a portico supported by 5 pillars with a council chamber behind; here or in the Merchants' Tolzey opposite the Bristol Corporation held its deliberations, sometimes assisted by leading merchants. The Corporation's business outgrew both the Council House and Tolzey, and in 1657 a private house at the corner of Broad Street was acquired to provide more office space. In 1704 the Tolzey was demolished and a new, enlarged Council House was built; this in turn gave way to the current Old Council House building in 1823. Robert Smirke's original design for this was for a much larger building incorporating the site of the Guildhall, but these plans were scaled down because the street needed widening which left insufficient room.

The Old Council House acted as a focus for protest much as does College Green, where its present day equivalent stands today: In 1752 Corn Street was descended on by 'a riotous and formidable mob of colliers and country people from Kingswood and adjacent parts', angry at the scarcity of corn; they smashed the windows of the Council House and Exchange, plundered a corn ship and brought trade to a halt. The citizens rallied behind the Mayor, but it took a week to quell the riot and lives were lost. The Old Council House was the target of another attack in 1831, during riots sparked by the arrival in Bristol of anti-reform Recorder Sir Charles Wetherell. After the mob had smashed around 100 panes of glass, Captain Gage of the 14th Dragoons rode up with orders to do what he thought necessary to defend the Council House. He sabre-charged the rioters through High Street, Broad Street and Wine Street; eight of them were badly hurt and one person (possibly an innocent ostler returning from his stable) was shot and killed. In February 1932, 4000 demonstrators processed to the Old Council House where councillors were discussing a reduction in unemployment benefit; their deputation was refused admittance and ultimately mounted police and batons were used, reportedly injuring 30 demonstrators and some police. Later that year a deputation stormed the Council Chamber, following their decision to cut relief. A baton charge by police allowed the councillors to escape from the crowd.

This building was extended in 1827 and again in 1899; in 1883 the Council House Rearrangement Committee suggested building grand new offices on a site made by roofing over the river Frome between the Stonebridge and the Drawbridge (where present-day Magpie Park was made), but the council settled for rearranging the furniture instead. By the mid-20th century it was finally determined to move to a new site, and in 1952 the council relocated to what is now City Hall on College Green. This building, it may be noted, has a moat.

The Old Council House is now Bristol Register Office, after the service moved into the building from Quakers Friars in 2007.

=== Worship ===
There were once three churches in Corn Street: St Leonard's, which stood over St Leonard's Gate (or Westgate) at the end of Corn Street; St Werburgh's, on the corner of Small Street; and All Saints', near the corner of High Street. Of these, only All Saints' survives in its original location.

In 1770, two years after the completion of the new Bristol Bridge, St Leonard's Church was taken down 'with the Tower and Blind Gate under it'. This cleared the way to extend Corn Street down to the quayside at what is now The Centre; work began on construction of this new street, Clare Street, in 1771.

St Werburgh's Church is unusual in that it has been made redundant twice, in two different locations. In 1877 it was decided that the church 'would far better serve its purpose in such a district as Baptist Mills'; removing the church would also allow for road widening at the junction of Corn Street and Small Street. The last service was held on 12 August of that year, the church was taken down, and parts of it – most notably the tower – were re-erected in Mina Road in the area now known as St Werburghs. The church became redundant again in 1988, but has found new use as an indoor climbing centre.

All Saints' Church, with its distinctive cupola, was once home to the Kalendaries. This brotherhood of clergy and laity assembled a library to which the public had free access at certain times, so possibly the earliest public library in England. The library contained some 800 books, mostly relating to Anglo-Saxon antiquity and law, but was lost to a fire in 1466. Robert Ricart, from whose work The Maire of Bristowe is Kalendar Ricart's Plan is taken, was a member of this brotherhood. All Saints' contains the ornate tomb of prominent slave trader Edward Colston.

=== Hospitality ===
Corn Street was the location of The Bush, 'the most famous of the coaching houses', until it was demolished in 1854 to make way for the new premises of West of England and South Wales District Bank. When Dickens' Mr Pickwick came to Bristol, it was here that his fictional stay took place. Bush proprietor John Weeks made a lasting reputation for himself for his generous bills of fare, and for his public spirit; his larder at Christmas time was described as 'gargantuan'. In 2016 these same premises came full circle when, together with the former Midland Bank building next door, they were converted into a luxury hotel.

Other financial institutions on Corn Street have now merged, closed or moved to other premises, and their buildings have generally found leisure uses. Coutts Bank moved its Corn Street branch to Queen Square in 2000 and their old premises became a coffee shop; Barclays at No.40 is now an Australian themed bar; No.47, another former bank, is also a bar; The banking hall of No.31 is now a bar and restaurant; and No.35 is an Indian street food restaurant. The Commercial Rooms has become part of a national pub chain.

== Corn Street today ==
St Nicholas Market, held in and around The Exchange, was recently claimed to be one of the ten best markets in the UK and is home to one of the largest collection of independent retailers in the city. Corn Street hosts a weekly Farmers and Producers market, twice-weekly Street Food markets, daily indoor market in The Exchange, and the twice-weekly 'Nails' market for original artwork, photography, jewellery and vintage clothing.

Bars and restaurants now occupy many of the former bank buildings and offices on Corn Street, though NatWest retains a significant presence with offices at No.32.

Bristol City Council still owns and operates the Old Council House, which is now a Register office (United Kingdom), wedding venue and conference facility, and The Exchange.

Corn Street is within the 'Old City and Queen Square Conservation Area'.

== Sites of interest ==
- The Exchange, built in 1741–43 is John Wood the Elder's outstanding public building. In front of this are four bronze tables dating from the 16th and 17th centuries, known as nails, at which merchants carried out their business.
- All Saints' Church was probably founded before the Norman conquest. Although it is not generally open to the public, it may be possible to obtain a glimpse of the interior through glazed doors.
- The Commercial Rooms, built in 1810 as coffee rooms for merchants and now a pub.
- The Harbour Hotel, built in 1854–58 for the West of England and South Wales Bank, has an ornate façade featuring columns and stone carvings of ships, lions and cherubs.
- St Nicholas Market (see Corn Street today).

== Listed buildings ==
Corn Street and Clare Street have many listed buildings:

Number	Grade	Year listed	Description
2 Clare Street	II	1993	Glass Chambers
4, 6 and 8 Clare Street	II	1977	Abbey Chambers
10 Clare Street	II	1977	10, Clare Street
12 Clare Street	II	1977	12, Clare Street
13 Clare Street	II	1977	13, Clare Street
14 Clare Street	II	1977	14, Clare Street
15 Clare Street	II	1977	15, Clare Street
17 and 19 Clare Street	II	1966	17 and 19, Clare Street
25 and 27 Clare Street	II	1966	25 and 27, Clare Street
28 Clare Street	II	1977	28, Clare Street, 14, St Stephen's Street
30 Clare Street	II	1977	49, St Nicholas Street, 30, Clare Street
31 and 33 Corn Street	II	1966	31 and 33, Corn Street
32 and 34 Corn Street	II	1971	National Westminster Bank
35 Corn Street	II	1966	35, Corn Street
36 Corn Street	II	1971	National Westminster Bank
37 Corn Street	II	1981	37, Corn Street
38 Corn Street	II	1977	Coutts Bank
40 and 42 Corn Street	II	1977	Barclays Bank
43 Corn Street	II*	1959	Bristol Commercial Rooms and attached railings
44 Corn Street	II	1959	Shaftesbury Chambers
47 Corn Street	II	1977	47, Corn Street
48 Corn Street	I	1959	The Old Post Office
n/a	II	1977	Gas lamp approximately 2 metres from north west corner of The Exchange, Corn Street
n/a	I	1977	Attached basement area railings to The Exchange
n/a	I	1959	The Nails
n/a	II	1977	Gas lamp approximately 2 metres from north east corner of The Exchange, Corn Street
n/a	I	1959	The Exchange
53 and 55 Corn Street	II*	1959	Lloyds Bank
56 Corn Street	II*	1959	56, Corn Street
All Saints Court	II	1959	Glebe House and attached area railings
All Saints Church	II*	1959	Church of All Saints
The Old Council House	II*	1959	The Old Council House and attached front gates
58 Corn Street	II	1977	58, Corn Street

== Gallery ==
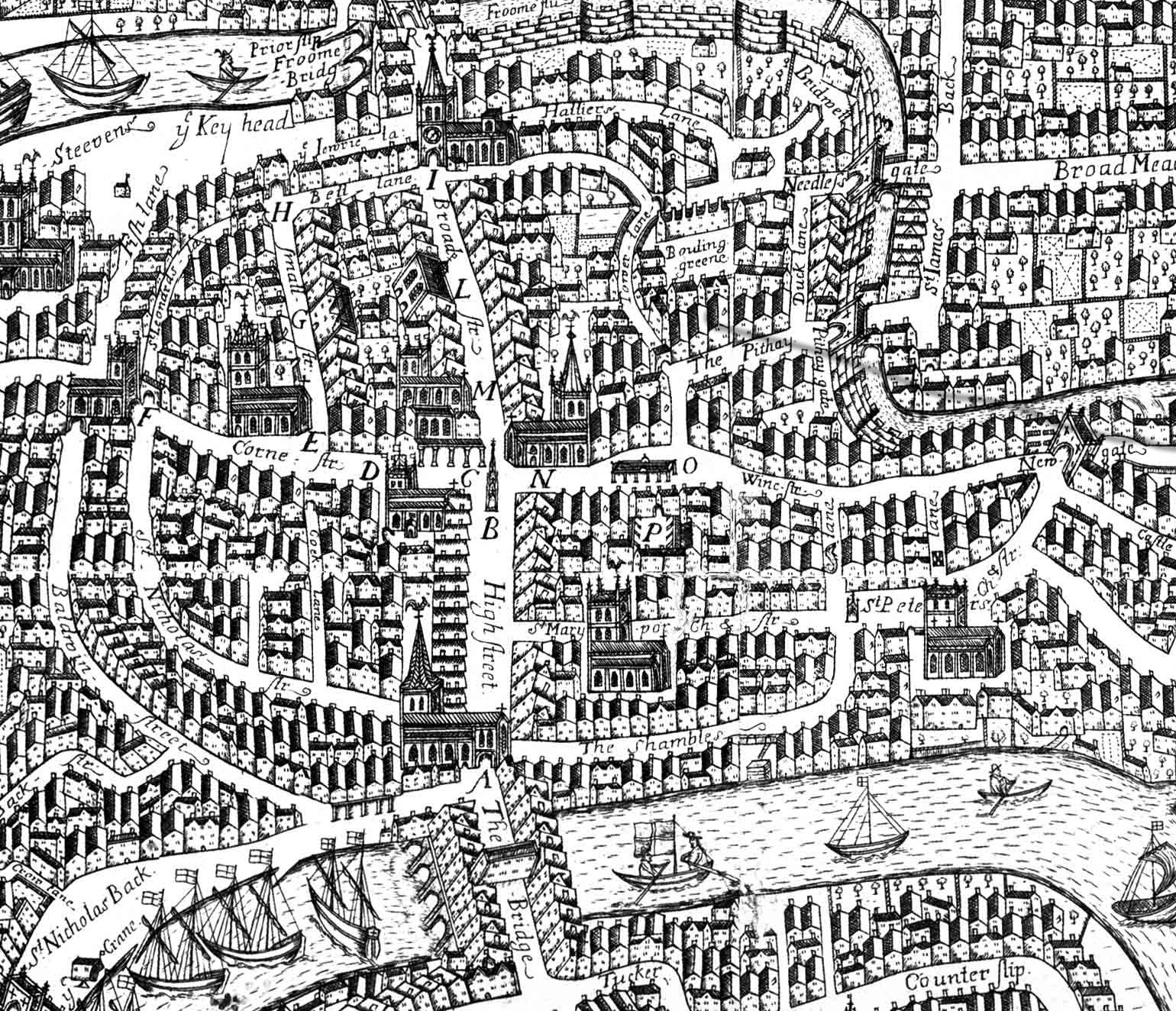
Mediaeval town of Bristol, from Millerd's Map of 1671. The three churches on Corn Street are all shown

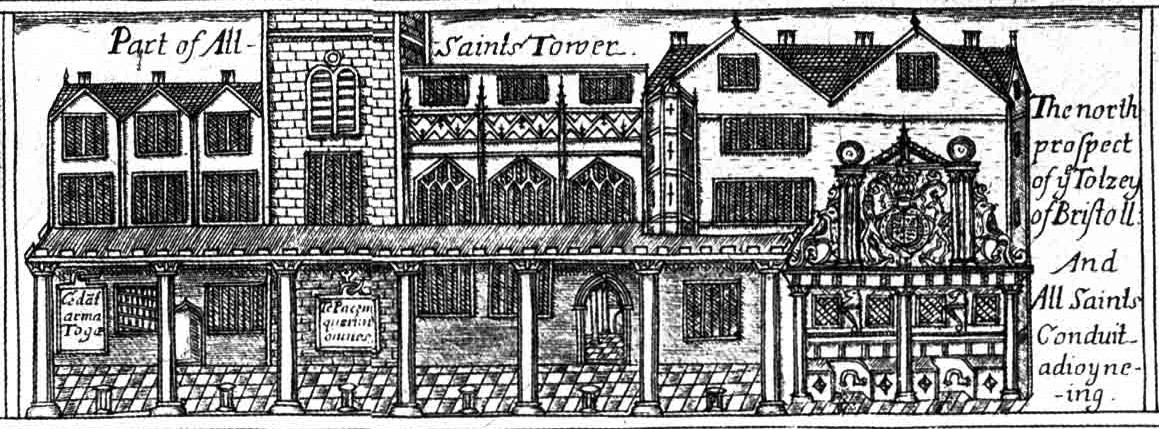
Merchant's Tolzey, Bristol from Millerd's Map. Six 'nails' are in evidence in this view.

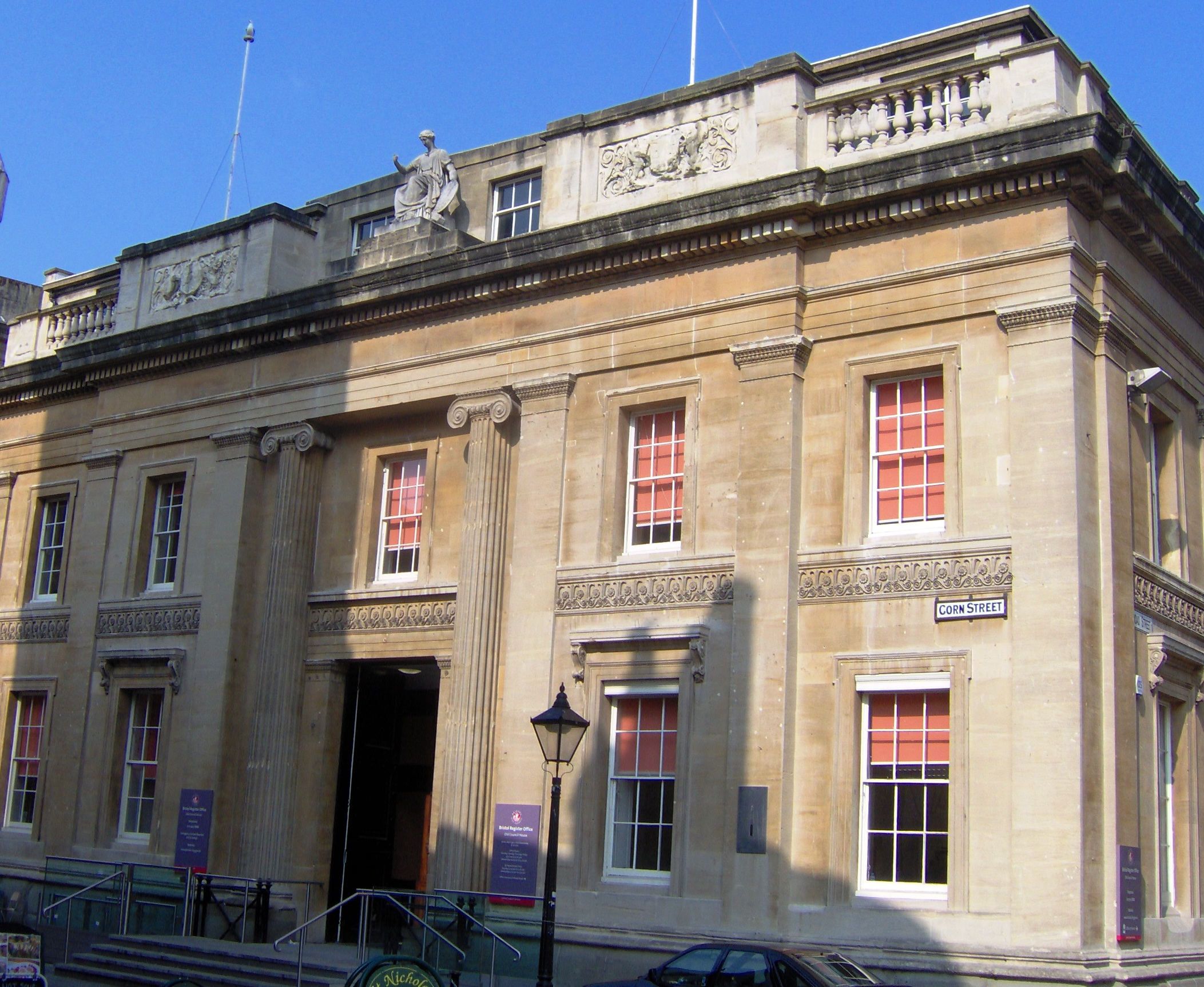
The Old Council House

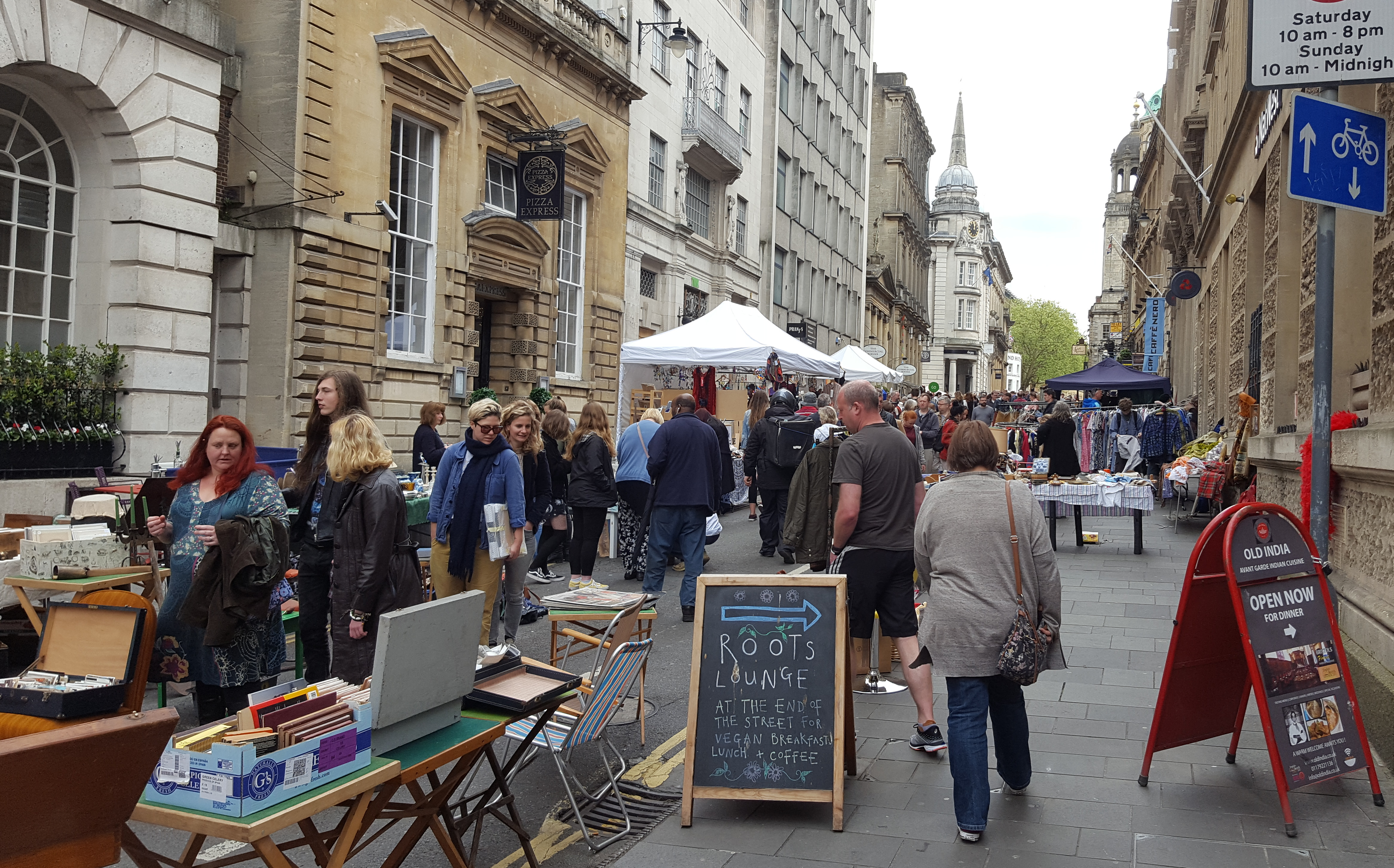
Corn Street, looking towards Wine Street on a market day

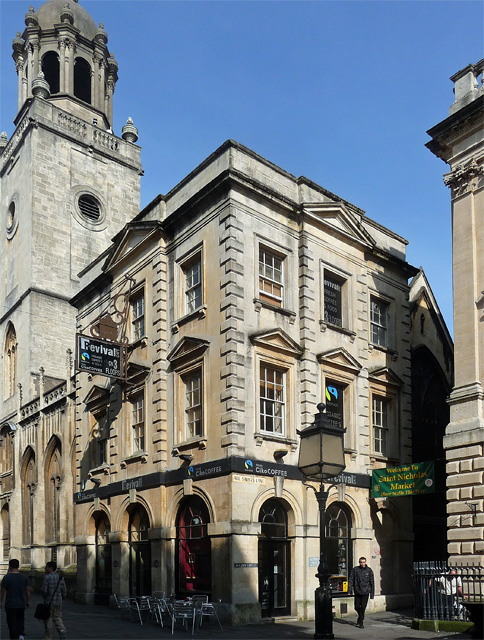
56 Corn Street

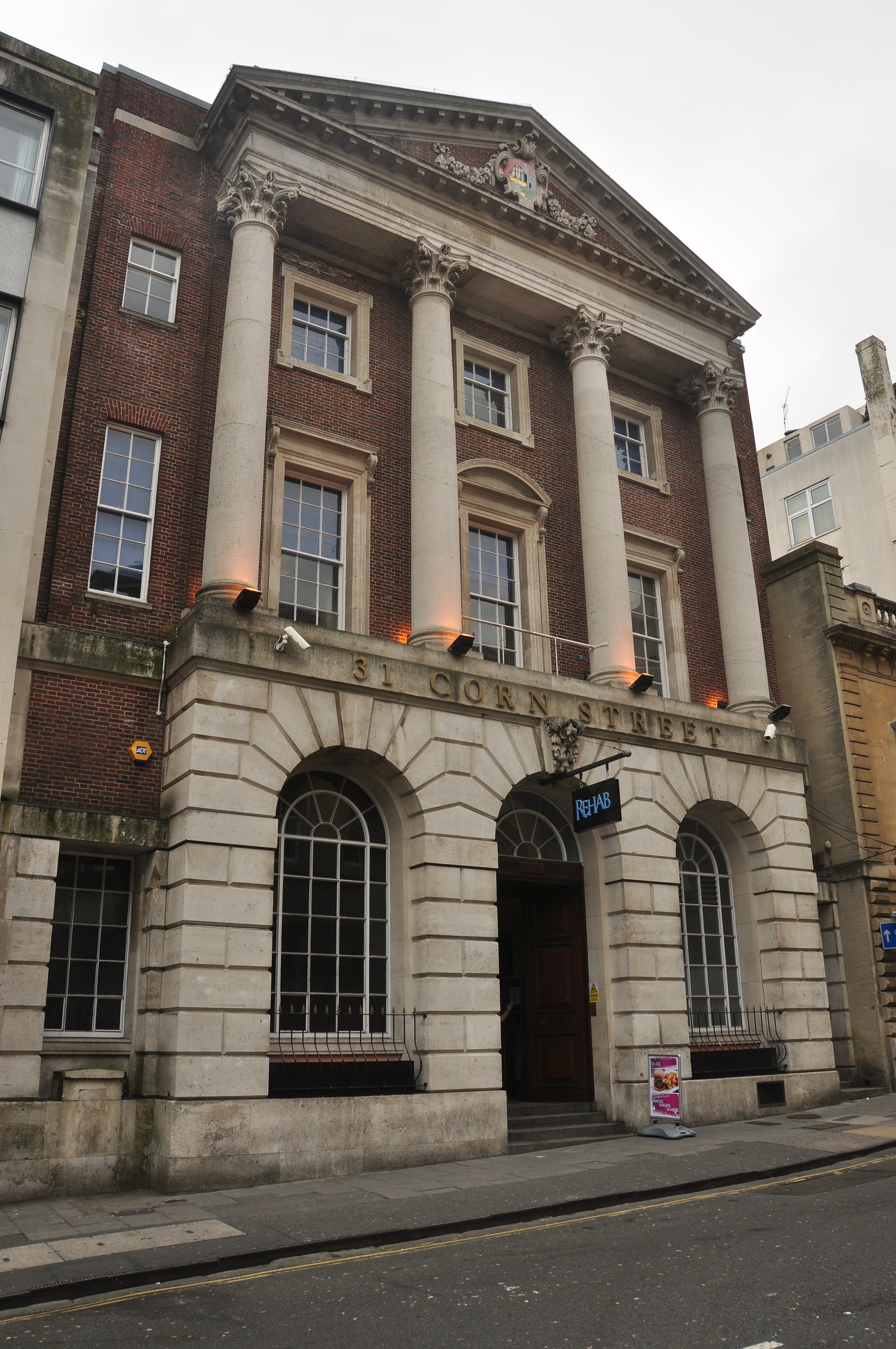
31 Corn Street, former bank now a bar and restaurant

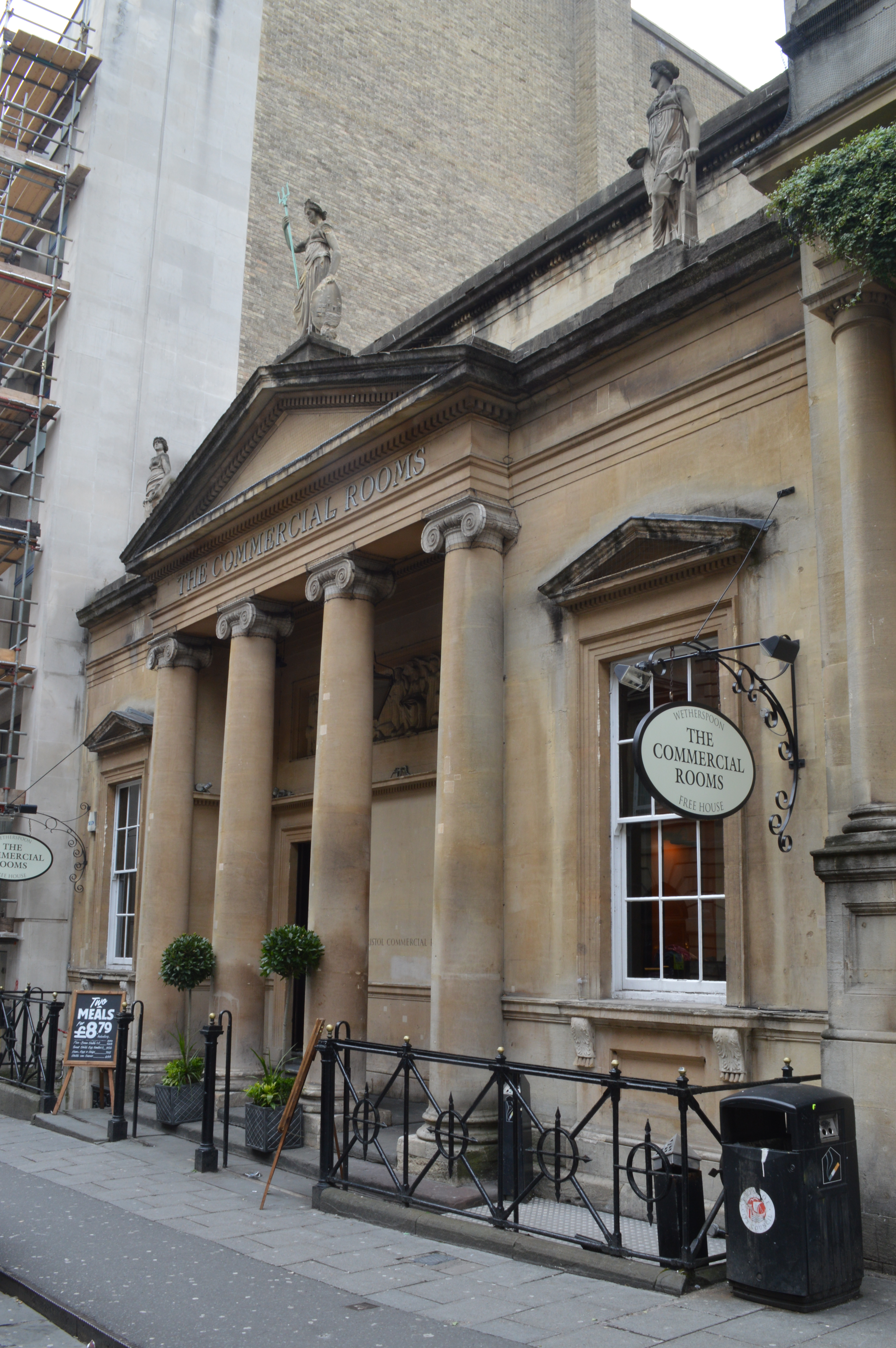
The Commercial Rooms, former Club now a pub

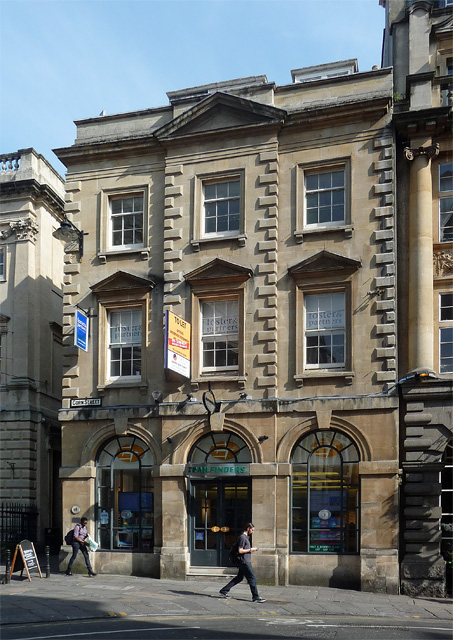
48 Corn Street

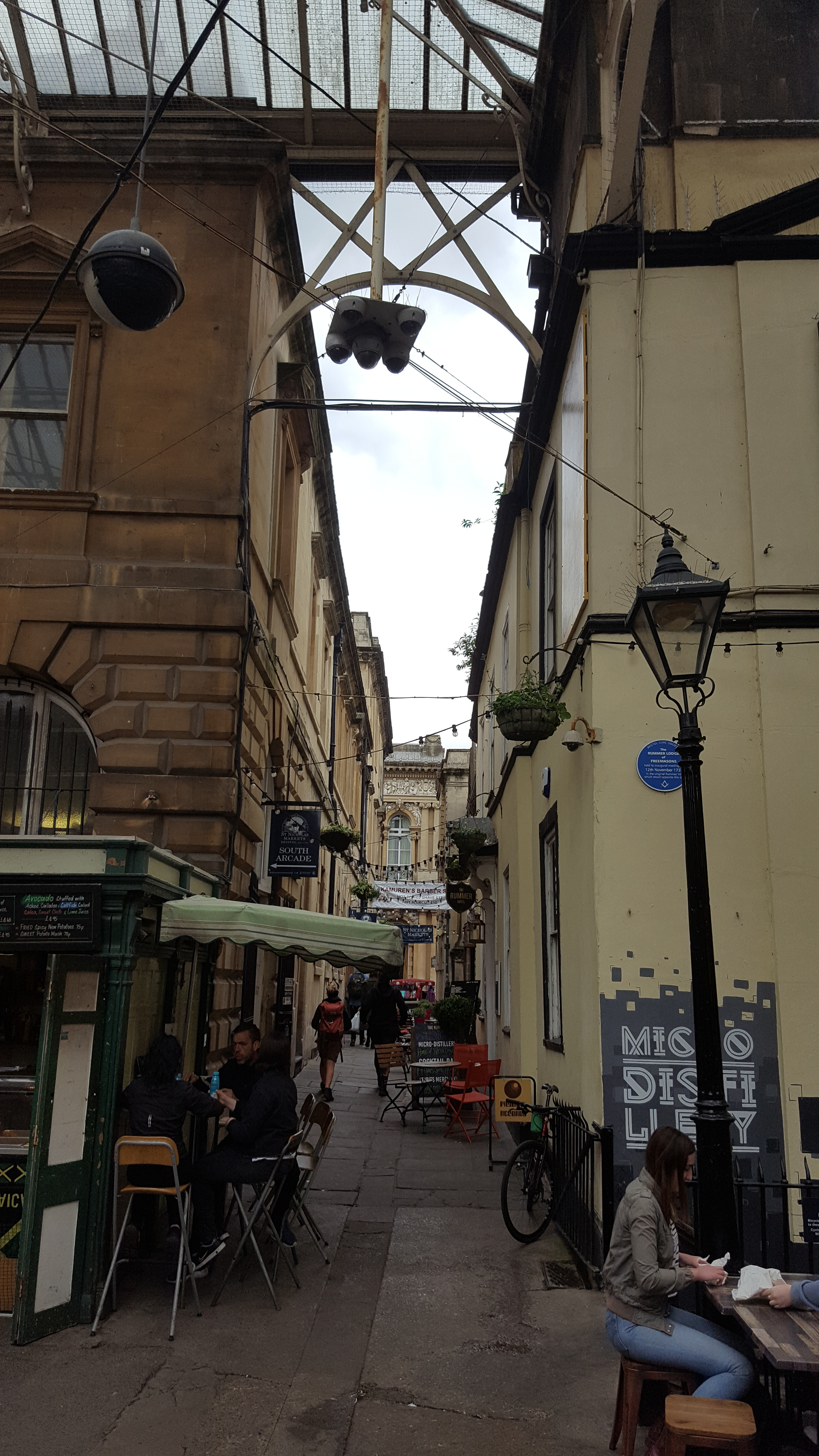
All Saints Lane, looking towards Corn Street

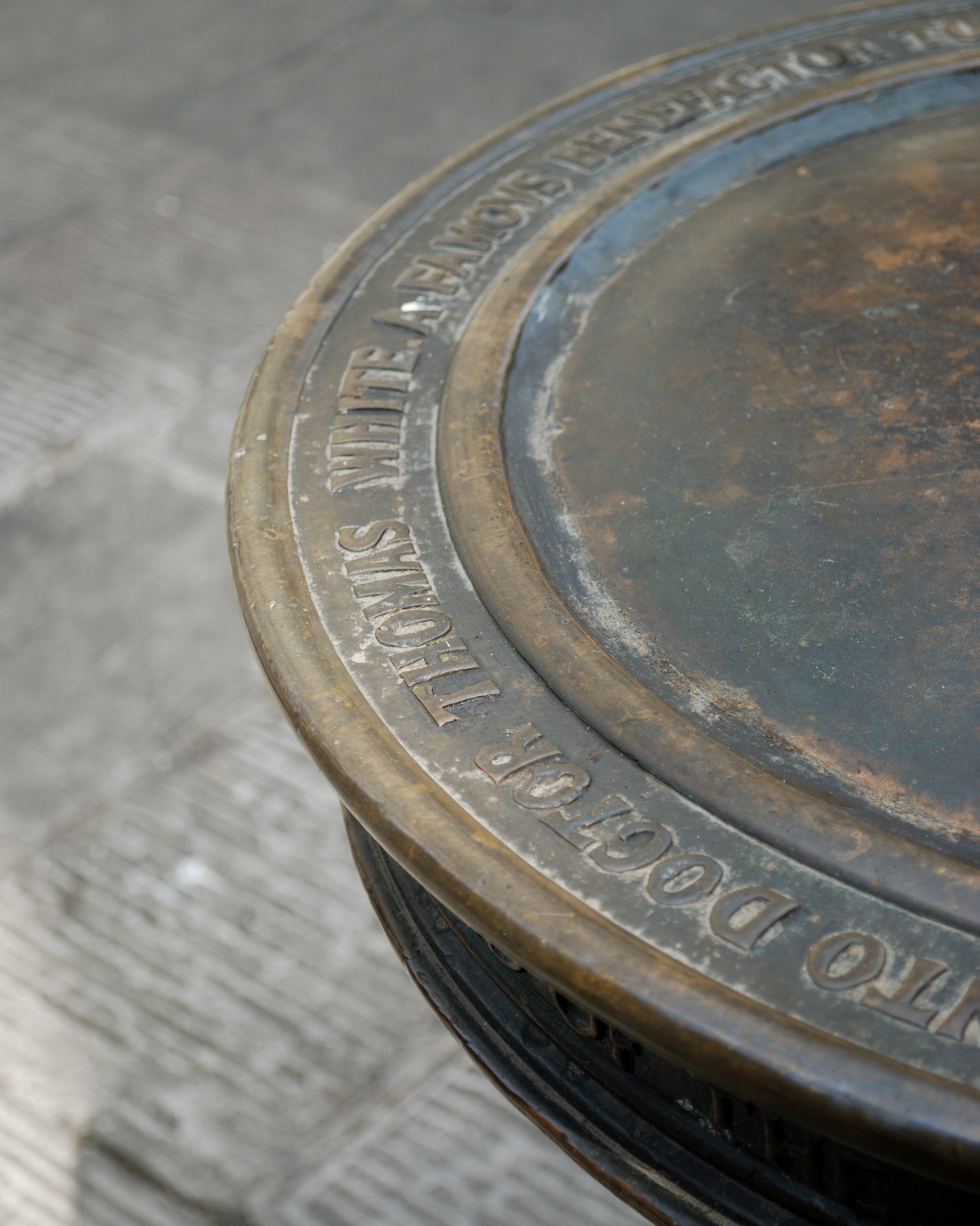
Detail of one of the Nails

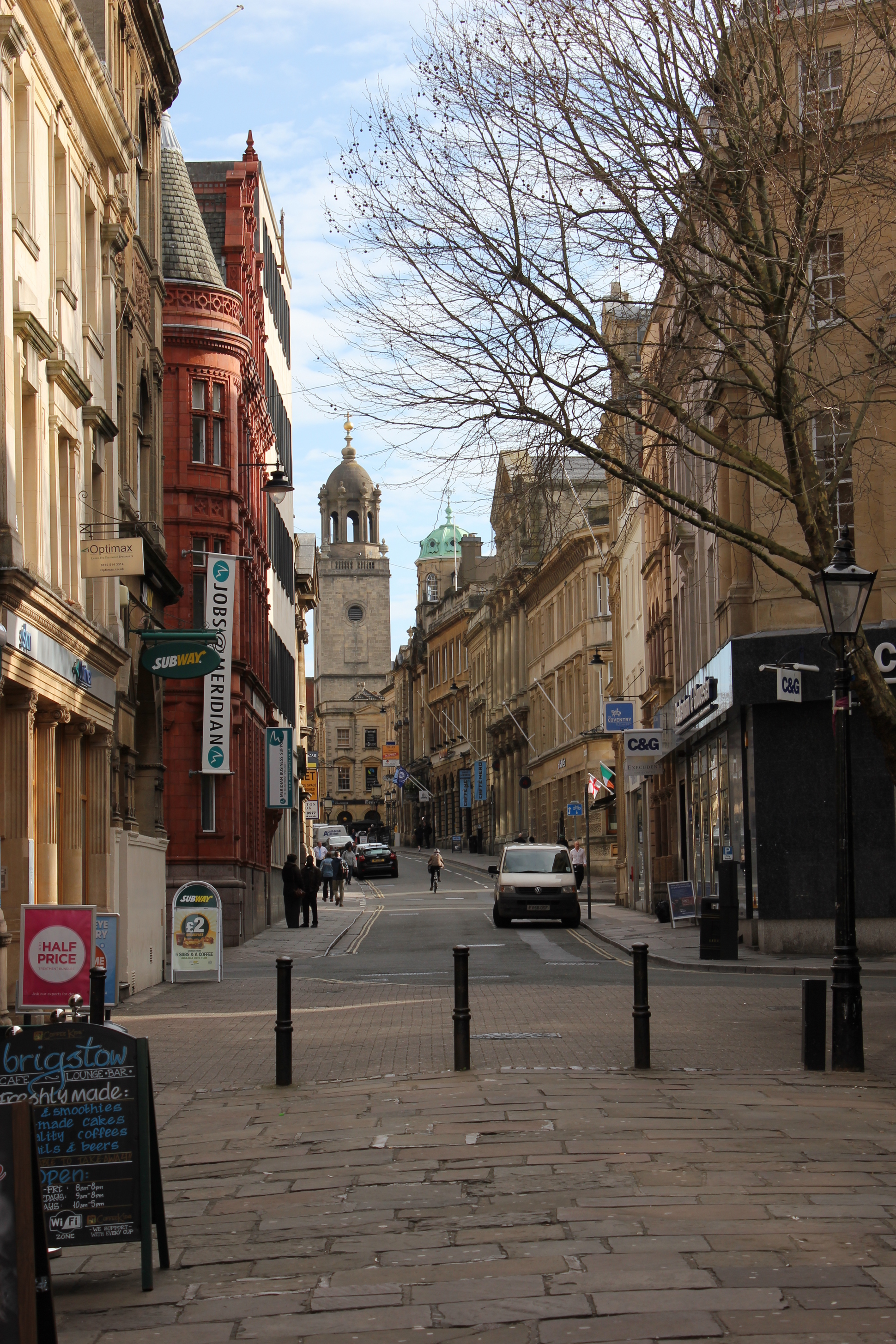
Clare Street, looking towards Corn Street

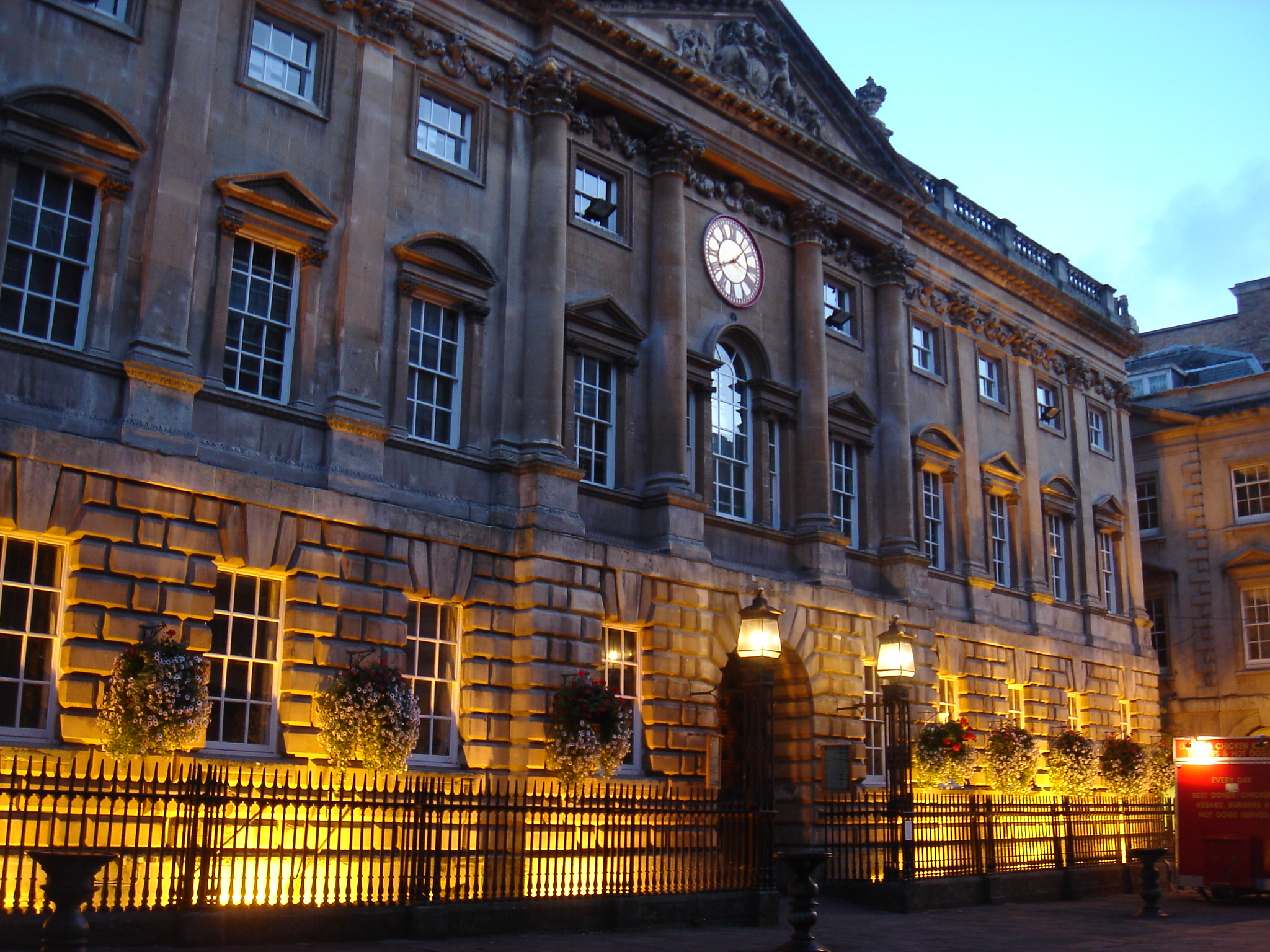
The Exchange
