= The Dutch House, Bristol =

The Dutch House
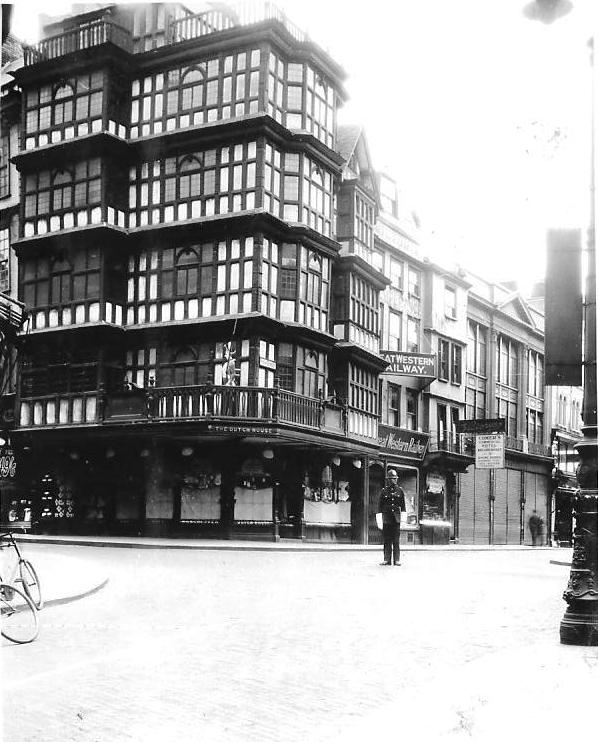
- The Dutch House in 1931

- Location within Bristol

General information
- Architectural style: Vernacular
- Location: Bristol, England
- Coordinates: 51°27′18″N 2°35′34″W
- Completed: 1676
- Demolished: 1940, Bristol Blitz

Technical details
- Structural system: Timber frame

The Dutch House was a large timber-framed building situated at Nos 1 and 2, High Street Bristol, England. It was a well-known local landmark until its destruction in 1940.

== History ==
The Dutch House (often given the prefix 'Old') was built or rebuilt as a private residence in 1676, and dominated the medieval crossroads of High St, Wine Street, Broad Street and Corn Street in the heart of ancient Bristol.

Sitting on top of medieval vaulted stone cellars, which also ran out under Wine Street, the more prominent part of the structure was No. 1 High St. This was of rectangular plan, two bays by one, and originally five stories tall; an attic storey was added later. This building had facades on both Wine St and High St. The Wine St façade was two bays wide and consisted of a square bay window to the full height of the original building (except the ground floor), with a flat façade to its right. The High St façade consisted of a bay window, narrower than that on the Wine St façade and with splayed sides, but similar in all other respects. Both facades were ornately carved.

The adjoining house at No.2 High St was incorporated into the premises at some point before 1860. This four-storey gabled house was considerably less ornate than No.1 and may have hinted at the design of No.1 before 1676. It consisted of full-width square bays to the first and second storeys, and a smaller square bay offset to the left on the third storey. The third storey bay was rebuilt at some point between 1847 and 1866 to make it symmetrical, and the façade of this building was changed by exposing and embellishing its frame to unify it with the rest of the building.

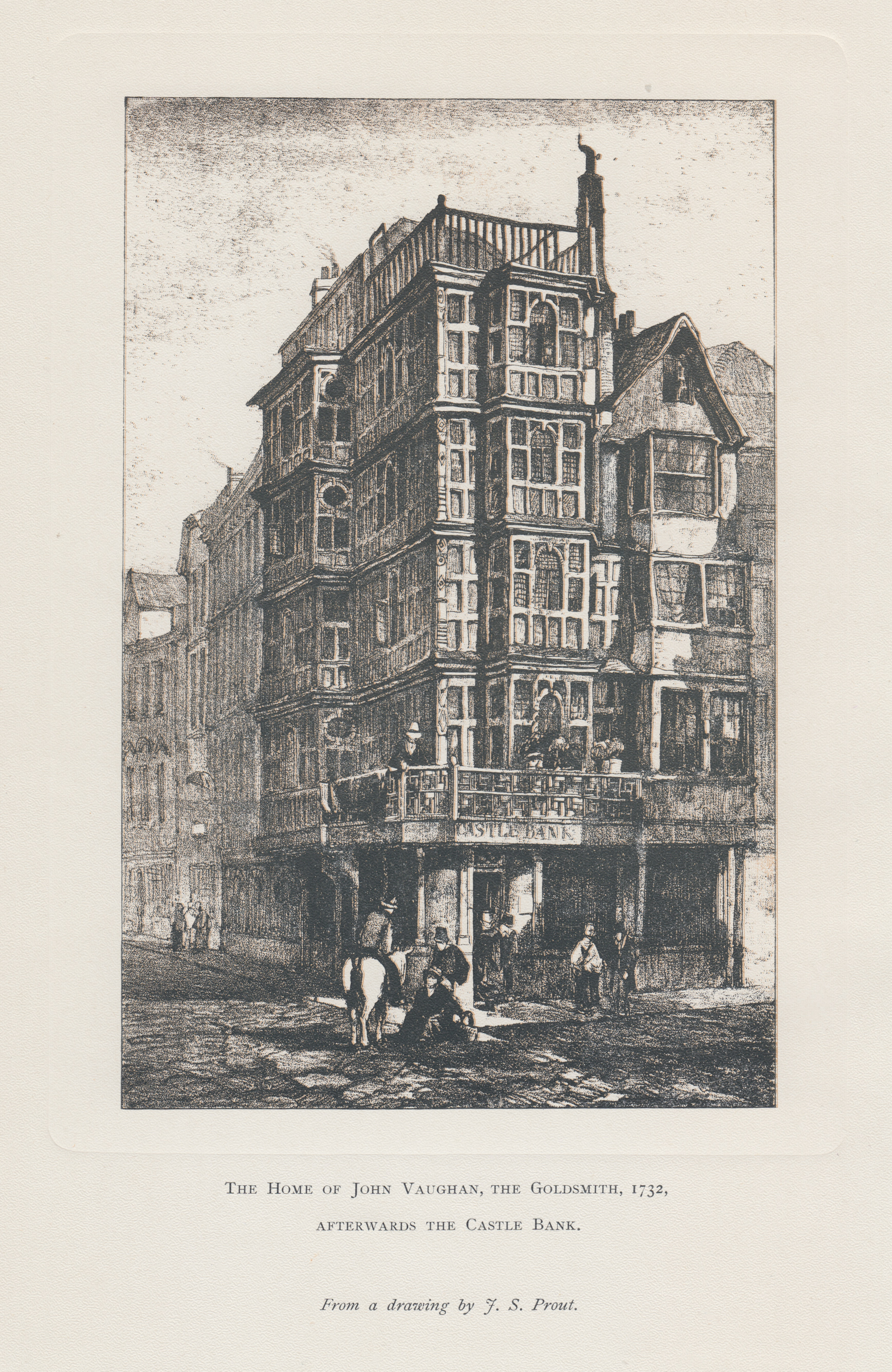
The Dutch House, Bristol c.1850

In 1810 the Dutch House became the Castle Bank, and subsequently had a succession of retail and office uses. By 1866, under the auspices of the hatter T. W. Tilly, it had gained fake battlements with cannon, a weather vane, a flagpole and a Grenadier Guardsman sign (now in the care of the City Museum). It seems likely that Tilly was also responsible for altering the façade of No.2. A watercolour drawing of The Dutch House by Bristol-born artist Blanche Baker was exhibited at Bristol in 1885. The battlements, incongruous on a timber-framed building, had been removed by 1917.

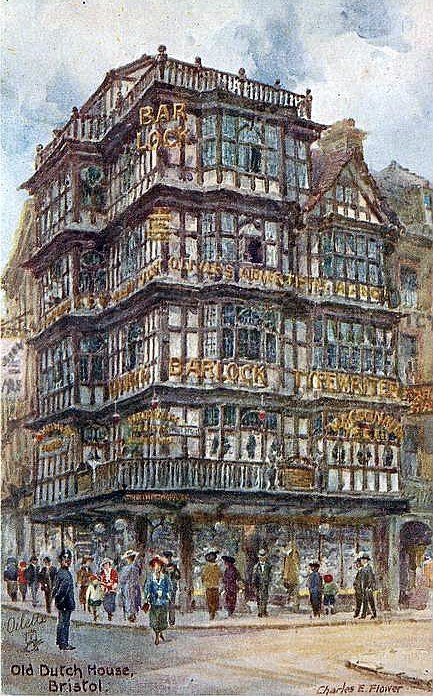
The Old Dutch House by Charles E. Flower, about 1912

In the early 1900s traffic engineers planned to demolish the building to ease the flow of traffic between High St and Wine St. These plans were dropped after the Lord Mayor used his casting vote against them, however the lower storey was cut back by 8.5 feet (2.6 m) in 1908 to accommodate the pavement so that the junction could be eased. During these works the timber frame of the unified building was restored with much new woodwork, and a 5-storey inner steel skeleton was inserted. This included a 35 feet (11 m) diagonal beam to support the cantilevered weight of the upper floors, and corrected hundreds of years of sagging timber as the building was now supported by the steelwork. The plans from this time also show a new winder staircase surrounding an elevator in the southeast corner of the building.

The shop's final occupier was the Irish Linen and Hosiery Association.

The building was a well-loved landmark of the city and featured in pre-war guide books and in many photographs and postcards.

== The name ==
The name "The Dutch House" was used from about 1860, when T W Tilly took over the shop. It is thought that he may have given the building the name, and started the story that its timber frame was constructed in Holland and then brought over and assembled in England.

This story does not bear close scrutiny. Both of the original houses, though different in style, reflect the local vernacular; for example the High St facade of No.1 has many similarities with the surviving Llandoger Trow pub in Bristol.

Some of Bristol's timber-framed buildings were however constructed in part from recycled ship's timbers, so it is not completely out of the question that some of the timber frame may have come from a Dutch ship.

== Destruction ==
On Sunday, 24 November 1940 the Dutch House was almost completely consumed by the fire from incendiary bombs which fell in the 5-hour air raid of over 135 German bombers, part of the Bristol Blitz which destroyed much of Bristol's pre-war shopping area. A photograph taken immediately after the raid shows that only 4 of the 5 storeys of the High Street facade and a small section of the Wine Street return remained, the inside having been completely burnt away and the tottering facade only held up by the inner steel skeleton (badly twisted in the fire) which had been inserted in 1908 as part of the rebuild. Three days later on 27 November 1940 an army demolition team pulled the remains down by cables attached to a lorry to make the corner safe. According to an eye-witness account, the demolition took considerable effort as the steel frame was connected to the boundary walls of Jones and Company department store on either side in multiple places.

With Wine and High Streets massively widened between 1956 and 1963, the site where the building stood is now occupied by an extension to Broad Street where it intersects with High St and Wine St. This new junction was further altered in 1976 when the east end of Corn St was pedestrianised. The Wine St/High St corner of the medieval carfax (crossroads) now sits 130 feet diagonally back from where the missing 4th corner was.
