= List of public art in Bristol =

This is a list of public art in Bristol, England. This list applies only to works of public art on permanent display in an outdoor public space. For example, this does not include artworks in museums.

== Bedminster ==
Image	Title / subject	Location and coordinates	Date	Artist / designer	Type	Material	Dimensions	Designation	Wikidata	Notes
	Water Maze	Victoria Park, Bedminster	1984	Peter Milner & Jane Norbury	Fountain	terracotta, red bricks				

== Brislington ==
Image	Title / subject	Location and coordinates	Date	Artist / designer	Type	Material	Dimensions	Designation	Wikidata	Notes
More images	Tomb of Raja Rammohun Roy	Arnos Vale Cemetery, Brislington	1843-1844	William Prinsep	Chhatri	Masonry, limestone	6m high, 4m square at base	Grade II*	Q17553220	Mason:- John N Brown of Stokes Croft.
More images	Arno's Court Triumphal Arch	Junction of Bath Road and Spine Road, Brislington	1994	Susan Dring	Statues	Bath stone			Q4794864	Modern versions of 4 statues replacing originals dating from 1760s. Subjects are Edward I, Edward II, Geoffrey, Bishop of Coutances and Robert, Earl of Gloucester.

== Broadmead ==
Image	Title / subject	Location and coordinates	Date	Artist / designer	Type	Material	Dimensions	Designation	Wikidata	Notes
	Figure of Justice	The former Magistrates Court, Bridewell St.	1879	Edward Sheppard	Statue	Portland stone	c.3m high	Grade II		Architect Josiah Thomas.
More images	John Wesley	New Room 51.457651°N 2.587900°W	1932	Arthur George Walker	Equestrian statue	Bronze & limestone		Grade II listed building	Q26571319	Cast at the AB Burton foundry, Thames Ditton
More images	Charles Wesley	Rear of the New Room	1938	Frederick Brook Hitch	Statue	Bronze on a Hornton stone pedestal		Grade II		
More images	Spirit of Bristol	Bond Street	1971	Paul Mount	Sculpture	Stainless steel	540 cm high, on a 550 cm by 480 cm pedestal			
	St Odilla and the Bird	Inner courtyard, Bristol Eye Hospital, Lower Maudlin Road	1985	Stephen Joyce	Sculpture group	Bronze resin figure, bronze bird	160 cm high figure, 240 cm wingspan of bird			
More images	The Creation	Bristol Eye Hospital, Lower Maudlin Street	1986	Walter Ritchie	5 relief panels	Carved Ibstock brick	5 panels totalling 18 metres in length			Architects;- Kendall Kingscott Partnership.
	Lollipop Be-bop	Bristol Royal Hospital for Children, Upper Maudlin Street 51.4577605°N 2.5965818°W	2001	Andrew Smith	Sculpture	Stainless steel with optic fibre lighting				
	Broadmead Spheres	Broadmead 51.457606°N 2.589443°W	2008	Marion Brandis	Structure group	Concrete				Other names include Broadmead Balls and Bristol Blue. Originally the balls were blue with one of them being decorated with mosaic. However, the mosaics were removed in October 2022 due to "safety concerns and financial constraints."
	Spirit of the Trees	The Hub, Broadmead 51.457722°N 2.589129°W	2008	Wolfgang Buttress	Structure group					
More images	Twist	Newfoundland Circus 51.460089°N 2.582893°W	2008	Ackroyd & Harvey	Sculpture	Slates and solar panels				

== Castle Park ==
Image	Title / subject	Location and coordinates	Date	Artist / designer	Type	Material	Dimensions	Designation	Wikidata	Notes
More images	Bridge railings	Castle Park	1991-93	James McCullogh	Bridge railings	Metal work				
More images	Beside the Still Waters	Castle Park	1993	Peter Randall-Page	Sculptures & water feature	Granite				
	Line from Within	Castle Park	1993	Ann Christopher	Abstract sculpture	Patinated bronze	4.5 metre high			Cast at the Pangolin Foundry, Stroud
	Only the Dead Fish Go With the Flow	Castle Park	1993	Victor Moreton	Tiles and reliefs	Glazed ceramic tiles & moulded fish reliefs	7.5m by 6.5m square area			Work is in very poor condition.
	Throne	Castle Park	1993	Rachel Fenner	Sculpture	Normandy limestone				
More images	Fish	Castle Park	1993	Kate Malone	Fountain & tiles	Bronze fountain with terracotta tiles				Fountain cast at the Pangolin Foundry, Stroud
	Sikh soldiers Memorial	Castle Park	2019	Stephen Joyce	Plaque	Metal plaque on a granite base				Unveiled April 2019
More images	Bristol Crocodile	Castle Park	2024	Getting Up To Stuff	Sculpture	Plaster, cement and resins				Based on a local legend that a bus driver claimed to have spotted a crocodile near Bedminster Bridge. The statue appeared in a cubbyhole just above the river at Castle Park in September 2024.

== College Green ==
Image	Title / subject	Location and coordinates	Date	Artist / designer	Type	Material	Dimensions	Designation	Wikidata	Notes
	Four historical figures	North side of Great Gatehouse, facing College Green	c.1500	Unknown	Four statues	Stone		Grade I		Figures represent Edward the Confessor, Robert Fitzharding, Henry II and Abbot John Newland
More images	Queen Victoria	College Green 51.452153°N 2.599472°W	1888	Joseph Edgar Boehm	Statue on pedestal with relief panels	Marble, granite and bronze		Grade II listed building	Q7270543	
	Bristol Coat of Arms	Main entrance, Bristol Central Library	1906	William Aumonier	Carved sculpture	Bath stone				
	Historical figures	Bristol Central Library	1906	Charles James Pibworth	Three relief panels, each of seven figures	Stone				Subjects are King Alfred and the Medieval Chroniclers, The Venerable Bede and the Early Literary Saints and Chaucer and the Canterbury Pilgrims
	Four ecclesiastical figures	South side of Great Gatehouse	1914	Charles James Pibworth	Four statues	Portland stone		Grade I		
More images	Two unicorns	Roof of City Hall, Bristol	1950/ 1953	David McFall	Two 3.6m statues	Gilded bronzes				
More images	An Elizabethan Mariner	City Hall, Bristol	1952	Charles Wheeler	Statue	Stone				
	Seahorses and Riders	Roof of rear extension to City Hall, Bristol	1953	David McFall	Two 2.4m statues	Portland stone		Grade II*		
More images	The Refugee	Bristol Cathedral garden	1980	Naomi Blake	Sculpture	Bronze resin				
More images	Ram Mohan Roy	College Green 51.451873°N 2.601397°W	1997	Niranjan Pradhan	Statue	Bronze				

== Clifton ==
Image	Title / subject	Location and coordinates	Date	Artist / designer	Type	Material	Dimensions	Designation	Wikidata	Notes
More images	Hercules	Goldney House	c.1715	John Norst, attributed.	Statue	Lead statue on a limestone pedestal		Grade II*	Q17553184	
	Memorial to the 79th Regiment of Foot	Clifton Down	1767		Decorated sarcophagus	Limestone with slate & copper panels		Grade II*		Erected by General Sir William Draper in memory of the officers and men who fought in the Seven Years' War.
	Monument to William Pitt, Earl of Chatham	Clifton Down	1767		Obelisk & plinth	Limestone with slate panels		Grade II*		Erected by General Sir William Draper.
More images	Alderman Proctor's Drinking Fountain	Clifton Down	1872	Henry & George Godwin	Fountain	Stone & limestone	7.5m high, 3.25m square	Grade II	Q4713691	
More images	1899–1902 South African War Memorial	Quadrangle of Clifton College	1904	Alfred Drury	Statue of Saint George	Bronze statue on a Portland stone pedestal		Grade II*	Q26678257	Architects;- WS Paul & RC James.
More images	Memorial gateway	Entrance to Clifton College	1922	Lettering by Eric Gill, carved by Lawrence Cribb	Triple arch gateway	Red sandstone, Bath stone	7m high, 11.6m wide by 5m deep	Grade II	Q26497791	Architect, Charles Holden.
More images	Clifton Hill war memorial	St Andrew's Graveyard, Birdcage Walk, off Clifton Hill			Cross on octagonial base	Portland stone	4m tall		Q83188422	
	Earl Haig	School House Garden, Clifton College	Cast 1931; unveiled 1932	William McMillan	Statue	Bronze		Grade II	Q26586264	Cast at AB Burton foundry, Thames Ditton
More images	Memorial to the victims of the Katyn massacre	Grounds of Clifton Cathedral	1985	Alexander Paul Klecki	Sculpture	Fibre glass relief panel mounted on a block of Cornish granite with a plinth of Portland stone				

=== Bristol Zoo ===
Image	Title / subject	Location and coordinates	Date	Artist / designer	Type	Material	Dimensions	Designation	Wikidata	Notes
	Entrance Lodge Frieze	Bristol Zoo	c.1929	Edgar Thomas Earp	Relief panels	Cast concrete	50 cm deep, 420 cm wide	Grade II		Design shows 23 animals.
	Alfred	Wall of gorilla house	1949	Roy Smith	Sculpture of the head of a lowland gorilla	Bronze	45 cm by 30 cm			
	Mute Swan	Bristol Zoo	1971	David Wynne	Sculpture	Bronze on steel piller with a concrete base	3.5m wide			
	Girl and Kid	Bristol Zoo	c.1975	Roy Clapp	Statue	Alabaster	1m high			
	Ying and Yang	Bristol Zoo	2001	Julian P Warren	Sculpture of 2 stag beetles	Black painted metal	3.3m long			
	Wendy the elephant	Bristol Zoo 51.463182°N 2.622619°W	2003	Diane Gorvin and Philip Bews		Cedar of Lebanon tree	4.5 metres (15 ft) high			
	Fountain	Bristol Zoo	c.2009	Jason Lane	Fountain	Repurposed metal machine parts				
	Stag Beetle	Bristol Zoo	2013	Jason Lane	Statue	Repurposed metal machine parts				

=== Victoria Rooms ===
Image	Title / subject	Location and coordinates	Date	Artist / designer	Type	Material	Dimensions	Designation	Wikidata	Notes
	Minerva, Goddess of Wisdom	Victoria Rooms 51.458036°N 2.609337°W	1839	Musgrave Lewthwaite Watson	Relief	Bath stone		Grade II* listed building		Carved by Jabez Tyley
	Joshua Reynolds	Facade of Royal West of England Academy building	c.1857	John Thomas	Statue	Stone	2.6m tall			
	John Flaxman	Facade of Royal West of England Academy building	c.1857	John Thomas	Statue	Stone	2.6m tall			
More images	The Gloucestershire Regiment Memorial	Queen's Road, opposite the Victoria Rooms	1904	Onslow Whiting	Sculpture	Bronze statue on a granite pedestal		Grade II	Q26498078	Cast 1904, unveiled 1905 as a Boer War memorial
More images	Edward VII	Victoria Rooms 51.458036°N 2.609337°W	1912	Edwin Alfred Rickards and Henry Poole	Statue	Bronze				
More images	King Edward VII fountain	Victoria Rooms 51.458036°N 2.609337°W	1912	Edwin Alfred Rickards & Henry Poole	Fountain			Grade II* listed building		
	Lion	Victoria Rooms	Cast 1915, erected 1917	Henry Poole	Sculpture	Bronze				Cast at J.W Singer & Sons at Frome
	Lion	Victoria Rooms	Cast 1915, erected 1917	Henry Poole	Sculpture	Bronze				Cast at J.W Singer & Sons at Frome

== Old City ==
Image	Title / subject	Location and coordinates	Date	Artist / designer	Type	Material	Dimensions	Designation	Wikidata	Notes
	Virgin and Child Enthroned	St Bartholomews Gateway, Narrow Lewins Mead	c. 1240	Unknown	Statue	Limestone	120 cm high	Grade II		Statue is headless and in very poor condition.
More images	William III	Queen Square 51.450532°N 2.594716°W	1736	John Michael Rysbrack	Equestrian statue	Brass		Grade I listed building	Q5384424	
	Four figures representing Europe, Asia, Africa & the Americas	Former Bristol Docks Authority Offices, Queens Square House, 19–21 Queen Square	1885-6	Unknown	Four statues	Portland stone	Each 3m high			Architect William Venn Gough.
	Queen Victoria and Prince Albert	Tower of the former Assize Court, Small Street	1867-1870	Unknown	Two statues	Stone	Approx. life-size	Grade II*		Architects TS Pope & J Bindon.
	John Milton, William Shakespeare & Walter Raleigh	13 Saint Stephens Street	1878	Unknown	Busts set in roundels	Terracotta				
More images	Samuel Morley	Lewin's Mead	1887	James Havard Thomas	Statue	Marble statue, granite base		Grade II	Q26581035	
	Two figures representing trade and industry	First floor facade of 55 St Stephens Street	1935	Unknown	Two deep relief figures	Portland stone	Each 2.3m high, 0.8m wide			Architect CFW Dening.
More images	Historical reliefs	Chantry Court, Denmark Street	1950-52	Attributed to Esmond Burton	Ten carved relief panels	Bath stone	Each 1.8m by 1.5m wide			Panels depict historic figures and events associated with the site. Architects;- Alec F French & Partners.
	Three Kings of Cologne	Chapel of the Three Kings of Cologne, Colston Street	1967	Ernest Pascoe	Three sculptures	Portland stone				Located in exterior niches of the Chapel.
More images	Cloaked Horseman	Narrow Lewins Mead	1984	David Backhouse	Equestrian statue	Bronze resin				Cast at Burleighfield Studios, High Wycombe
More images	Merchant Navy Association Memorial	Welsh Back	2000, unveiled 2001	David Backhouse	Monument with benches & panels	Tarn stone with bronze collar & panels				

=== Broad Street ===
Image	Title / subject	Location and coordinates	Date	Artist / designer	Type	Material	Dimensions	Designation	Wikidata	Notes
More images	Brennius and Belinus	City gateway beneath the tower of the Church of St John the Baptist	c.1700	Unknown	Two painted statues	Stone	Each 2m high			
More images	Quarter Jacks	Entrance facade to Christ Church with St Ewen, Broad Street	1728	James Paty	Two painted statues	Oak wood	1.6m high			Architect Thomas Paty.
	Guildhall figures	First floor facade of Bristol Guildhall, Broad Street	c. 1843–1886	John Thomas	Six statues	Bath stone		Grade II*		Figures include Queen Victoria, Edward III and Edward Colston.Architect Richard Shackleton Pope.
More images	Johannes Gutenberg & William Morris	Former Everard's Printing Works, Broad Street	1900-1901	William James Neatby	Glazed tiles	Ceramic tiles		Grade II*	Q5470087	Tiles by Doulton & Co.Architect Henry Williams.

=== Broad Quay ===
Image	Title / subject	Location and coordinates	Date	Artist / designer	Type	Material	Dimensions	Designation	Wikidata	Notes
	Farmer and Coal Miner	Broad Quay, reverse of King George V memorial	Statues c.1903, arch & base 1980		Sculpture	Portland stone statues; brick arch				Figures were originally among six on the Co-Operative Wholesale Society building which was on the site.
More images	King George V memorial	Broad Quay	1980	Plaque by Derek Carr		Brick arch with an aluminium plaque of a lion's head				Inscribed In Memory of King George V 1910–1936
More images	Fountain of Sabrina	Courtyard of Broad Quay House	1980	Gerald Laing	Sculpture	Bronze sculpture on a granite base				
	Aspects of Bristol's History	Broad Quay House	1981	Philippa Threlfall & Kennedy Collings	15 Low relief panels	Terracotta and buff clays with manganese & copper oxides & copper lustre glazes	Each plaque 100 cm by 150 cm		Q137807980	Architects:- Alec French Partnership

=== Corn Street ===
Image	Title / subject	Location and coordinates	Date	Artist / designer	Type	Material	Dimensions	Designation	Wikidata	Notes
More images	Bristol Nails	Pavement in front of the Exchange, Corn Street	1595-1631	Various including Thomas Hobson	Pillars with circular tops	Bronze	Approx. 100 cm high	Grade I	Q17528442	
	Caryatids & keystones	36 Corn Street	1864–67	William Bruce, carved by Thomas Colley	8 sculpture figures, 5 keystones	Limestone		Grade II		Built for Liverpool, London & Globe Insurance
More images	Wisdom	37–39 Corn Street	c.1932	A Compton Roberts & R Pyrce Roberts	Art Nouveau style grille	Birmabright cast metal grille	260 cm by 70 cm high	Grade II		
More images	Peace and Plenty, Benevolence and Prudence	37–39 Corn Street	1935	Joseph Hermon Cawthra	Two pairs of statues / relief carvings	Portland stone		Grade II		
	Pediment figures & decorative carvings	42 Corn Street	1904	Attributed to Gilbert Seale	Carvings	Limestone		Grade II		Built for London & Lancashire Insurance Company by architect Edward Gabriel
	Facade of Commercial Rooms	43 Corn Street	1811	James George Bubb	3 Statues & marble relief			Grade II*		Figures represent Commerce, the City of Bristol, Britannia, Neptune & Minerva
	Facade of Harbour Hotel building	53–55 Corn Street	1854-58	John Thomas	Statues and figures in relief	Bath stone with Portland stone figures & inserts		Grade II*		Figures depicted include garlands, horses, ships' prows & children with symbols of trade and industry. Building was originally the West of England & South Wales District Bank, later a Lloyds Bank.

=== Saint Nicholas Street ===
Image	Title / subject	Location and coordinates	Date	Artist / designer	Type	Material	Dimensions	Designation	Wikidata	Notes
	Water fountain	Saint Nicholas Street	1859	Will Bros of Suffolk	Drinking fountain	Cast iron		Grade II		Casting shows a young Queen Victoria supported by cherubs.
	Elephant head	20 Saint Nicholas Street	1867	Unknown	Relief carving	Stone	2.8m by 1.1m wide	Grade II		Site of former Elephant public house.
	Four heads	18 Saint Nicholas Street	1868	Unknown	Painted carvings		Each approx. 35 cm diameter	Grade II		Architects;- Archibald Ponton & William Venn Gough.
	Justice and Enterprise	42 Saint Nicholas Street	1903	Unknown	Two putti	Stone	1.2m high	Grade II*		Entrance to former Stock Exchange building; Architect;- Henry Williams.

=== The Centre ===
Image	Title / subject	Location and coordinates	Date	Artist / designer	Type	Material	Dimensions	Designation	Wikidata	Notes
More images	Neptune	The Centre 51.453359°N 2.597401°W	1723	John Randall	Statue	Cast lead statue on a granite plinth		Grade II* listed	Q17552681	
More images	Statue of Edmund Burke	The Centre 51.453359°N 2.597401°W	1894	James Havard Thomas	Statue	Bronze statue on a pink granite plinth		Grade II listed building	Q26571134	
	Drinking fountain	The Centre	1901		Fountain	Red & gray granite		Grade II		Erected to commemorate the Industrial and Fine Arts Exhibition of 1893 & 1894 which was held on the site.
More images	Bristol Cenotaph	The Centre	Unveiled 1932	Eveline Blacker and Harry Heathman		Limestone, stone base & metal panels		Grade II	Q42888084	
	Figurehead of the Demerara	The Centre		Wooden original carved by Robert Williams, Thomas Williams & John Robert Anderson	Replica of a ship's figurehead	Fibreglass	2.2m high			Original figurehead destroyed in 1937.
More images	Cascade Steps	The Centre	2000		Fountain	Stone				
	Millennial Beacons	The Centre	2000	Martin Richman	Beacon group	Perforated steel	6m high (seven beacons), 9m high (three beacons)			
More images	The Fourteenth Army, 1942–1945	The Centre	2008	Mike Baker	Commemorative plaque	Bronze set in Bath stone	72.5 cm diameter		Q83188423	

== Harbourside ==
Image	Title / subject	Location and coordinates	Date	Artist / designer	Type	Material	Dimensions	Designation	Wikidata	Notes
	Samuel Plimsoll	Capricorn Quay	1962, bust c.1880		Bust	White marble bust on a Cornish granite base		Grade II		Formerly located on Hotwell Road until 2009.
More images	John Cabot	Arnolfini 51.449006°N 2.597690°W	1984	Stephen Joyce	Statue					
	Untitled	Pooles Wharf Court	2001	Unknown	Sculpture	Polished stainless steel	2.8m high, 1.2m wide			Commissioned by the house builders who developed the site, designed by a student at the University of the West of England Art School with engineering by David Abel's Boatyard.
More images	Small Worlds	Anchor Road	2001	Simon Thomas	Sculpture	Cement with glass fibre strands	550 cm high, 160 cm diameter at base			Erected in honour of Paul Dirac
More images	Pero's Bridge	St Augustine's Reach 51.4501°N 2.5979°W	1999	Eilis O'Connell with Ove Arup & Partners	Bascule bridge		11 m (36 ft) span		Q7169415	
More images	Rhinoceros Beetle	Anchor Square 51.450393°N 2.599301°W	2000	Nicola Hicks	Sculpture	Bronze on a limestone pedestal				Cast at The Bronze Age Foundry, London

== Emerson Green ==
Image	Title / subject	Location and coordinates	Date	Artist / designer	Type	Material	Dimensions	Designation	Wikidata	Notes
More images	Butterfly	Emerson Green	2000	Walenty Pytel	Sculpture on column	Galvanized Steel	25ft high			Commissioned by South Gloucestershire District Council
More images	Dragonfly	Emerson Green	2000	Walenty Pytel	Sculpture on column	Galvanized Steel	25ft high			Commissioned by South Gloucestershire District Council

=== Millennium Square ===
Image	Title / subject	Location and coordinates	Date	Artist / designer	Type	Material	Dimensions	Designation	Wikidata	Notes
More images	Bill and Bob	Millennium Square 51.450316°N 2.601693°W	1999	Cathie Pilkington	Sculpture	Painted bronzes on rubber background				
More images	Telespine	Millennium Square 51.450316°N 2.601693°W	2000	Chee Horng Chang with Alan Baxter & Associates	Sculptural structure	Steel	20m high			Structure also serves as a phone mast.
More images	Thomas Chatterton	Millennium Square 51.450316°N 2.601693°W	2000	Lawrence Holofcener	Statue	Bronze	125 cm high			
More images	William Tyndale	Millennium Square 51.450316°N 2.601693°W	2000	Lawrence Holofcener	Statue	Bronze	125 cm high			
More images	William Penn	Millennium Square 51.450316°N 2.601693°W	2000	Lawrence Holofcener	Statue	Bronze	180 cm high			
More images	Aquarena	Millennium Square 51.450316°N 2.601693°W	2000	William Pye	Water feature	Stainless steel & black marble				
More images	Cary Grant	Millennium Square 51.450316°N 2.601693°W	2001	Graham Ibbeson	Statue	Bronze				

== Redcliffe ==
Image	Title / subject	Location and coordinates	Date	Artist / designer	Type	Material	Dimensions	Designation	Wikidata	Notes
More images	War memorial	St Mary Redcliffe	1921	George Oatley	Pillar and cross on steps	Stone		Grade II	Q66477918	
More images	Phonex and the Four Elements	Redcliffe Way	1985	John Doubleday	Sculpture & panels	Bronze sculpture & panels on a pyramidal structure clad in marble	330 cm high, 250 cm wide at base			
	Grain Chute	Ferry Street off Redcliffe St	c.1885, erected 1989	Unknown	Sculpture	Painted sheet metal				A spiral sack chute used in the former granary and flour mill on the site.
More images	Exploration: A Celebration of Bristol's seafaring heritage	Redcliff Quay	1991	Obelisk by Philippa Threlfall & Kennedy Collings; Sphere by James Blunt	Obelisk & armillary sphere	Stone & ceramic obelisk, stainless steel sphere				

== Redland ==
Image	Title / subject	Location and coordinates	Date	Artist / designer	Type	Material	Dimensions	Designation	Wikidata	Notes
	Princess Charlotte	Rear of former Queen Victoria House, Redland Hill	1817		Obelisk	Limestone		Grade II		
More images	Reverend Urijah Rees Thomes Memorial	Blackboy Hill	1904	S Whitehead & Sons	Fountain & clock tower	Red & white granite, with sandstone and tiled roof	18ft diameter at base	Grade II	Q26514687	
More images	War memorial	Whiteladies Road	1920		Cross on pedestal & steps	Stone		Grade II	Q26677247	

== St Pauls ==
Image	Title / subject	Location and coordinates	Date	Artist / designer	Type	Material	Dimensions	Designation	Wikidata	Notes
	Edward Colston	Colston Villas, Armoury Square, St Pauls	c.1978–81		Bust	Fibreglass resin	575 cm high			Replica of a terracotta bust by Michael Rysbrack.
	Alfred Fagon	Corner of Ashley Rd. & Grosvenor Rd.; St Pauls, Bristol	1987	David Mutasa	Sculpture	Bronze bust on a black marble pedestal	70 cm bust on a 131 cm pedestal			
	The Greater Crested Plunger, the Crested Columbus and the Hooked Beaked Bauton	Junction of Ashley Road & Grosvenor Rd., St Pauls	2008	Jason Lane	Bird sculptures on columns	Steel				
More images	Ruined	Brunswick Cemetery Garden	2010	Hew Locke	Set of 10 gravemarkers	Cast iron				Each grave marker bears a symbol or motif of a failed company, eg Enron

== Spike Island ==
Image	Title / subject	Location and coordinates	Date	Artist / designer	Type	Material	Dimensions	Designation	Wikidata	Notes
More images	Hand of the River God	Baltic Wharf	1986	Vincent Woropay	Sculpture on pedestal	Bronze sculpture on a limestone pedestal				Originally topped by small figure of Hercules holding an obelisk which is now lost.
	Topsail	Baltic Wharf	1987	Keir Smith	Sculpture	Portland stone	142 cm high by 244 cm long by 100 cm wide			Carved on site over six weeks.
More images	Atyeo	Baltic Wharf 51°26'52.580"N, 2°36'50.130"W	1989	Stephen Cox	Sculpture	Red Verona marble	178 cm high by 85 cm wide by 108 cm deep		Q18343111	Named in honour of John Atyeo.

== Stoke Bishop ==
Image	Title / subject	Location and coordinates	Date	Artist / designer	Type	Material	Dimensions	Designation	Wikidata	Notes
More images	War memorial	Stoke Bishop	1920	W.H. Watkins	Cross on shaft and pedestal	Stone	5m tall	Grade II	Q26677329	

== Temple ==
Image	Title / subject	Location and coordinates	Date	Artist / designer	Type	Material	Dimensions	Designation	Wikidata	Notes
	Emma Saunders	Entrance of Bristol Temple Meads railway station	1928	'Principal of masons H.Tyley of Victoria St.'	Plaque	White marble				
	T&GWU Emblem of Unity	Victoria Street	1959	Unknown	Sunken relief	Stone	4m high			Architects;- White and Travis London.
More images	Isambard Kingdom Brunel	Forecourt of Bristol Temple Meads railway station	1982	John Doubleday	Statue	Bronze on a glazed brick pedestal	225 cm high on 40 cm pedestal			Cast at the Art Bronze Foundry, London. Relocated from Temple Back East in 2021.
	Firefighters' Memorial	Corner of Temple Back and Water Lane	2003	Stephen Joyce	Statue	Bronze resin	190 cm high			Cast at the Fine Fettle art foundry, Frome.
	Templar Stone	Temple Back East	2004	Jane L Rickards	Sculpture	Portuguese granite	300 cm high			Architects;- Atkins Walters Webster.
	Six Portwell markers	Portwell, Temple Quay	2004	John Aiken	Six rectangular platforms	Polished black Portuguese granite, stainless steel & glass	Various			Marks the line of the 1250 Portwell, then the southern boundary of Bristol.
	Rotating Columns	Temple Way	2006-2007	Walter Jack	Sculpture	Vitreous enamel on steel	Each column is 9m high			Created by Walter Jack with Springboard Design Partnership and Trico vitreous enamellers, the 3 columns were designed to slowly rotate.

== Trinity Quay ==
Image	Title / subject	Location and coordinates	Date	Artist / designer	Type	Material	Dimensions	Designation	Wikidata	Notes
	Basset Hounds and Basenjis	Rear of Bristol Dog's Home, Albert Road, St. Philips	1991	Rodney Harris	Relief panels	Ibstock brick	200 cm high			
More images	Time and Tide	Trinity Quay	1994	Georgina Redfern	Sculpture	Steel & painted cast iron	340 cm high by 360 cm wide by 130 cm deep			
	D of the Drings & Memoirs of the Drings	Chimney Steps, St. Philips	2006	Walter Jack	Sculpture	Bronze resin				
	Freetank: The retrospective view of the pathway	Glass Wharf near Trinity Quay	2016	Roger Hiorns with Witherford Watson Mann architects	Two-piece abstract sculpture	Black Zimbabwean granite, concrete & Cornish basalt				www.freetank.bristol

== Tyndalls Park ==
Image	Title / subject	Location and coordinates	Date	Artist / designer	Type	Material	Dimensions	Designation	Wikidata	Notes
More images	Flat Out	University of Bristol, Indoor Sport Centre, Tyndall Avenue	2004	Jon Buck	Sculpture	Bronze				Cast at Pangolin Editions foundry
More images	Follow Me	Royal Fort Gardens	2009	Jeppe Hein	Mirror maze installation	76 polished steel plates				
More images	Hollow	Royal Fort Gardens	2016	Katie Paterson with Zeller & Moye (architects)	Sculpture	Wood				
More images	Henrietta Lacks	Royal Fort House	2021	Helen Wilson-Roe	Statue	Bronze				

== Westbury-on-Trym ==
Image	Title / subject	Location and coordinates	Date	Artist / designer	Type	Material	Dimensions	Designation	Wikidata	Notes
More images	War memorial	High Street, Westbury-on-Trym	1920		Obelisk on steps	Portland stone	7.5m tall	Grade II listing	Q2658111	
	Christ the King	Canford Cemetery, Westbury-on-Trym	1932-33, lettering 1933-62	Eric Gill, lettering by Lawrence Cribb	3 Gravestones	Portland stone	Central headstone 215 cm high, 70 cm wide by 25 cm			Headstones commemorate Abigail Chute, her sister Annie Oates & son Desmond.

== West End ==
Image	Title / subject	Location and coordinates	Date	Artist / designer	Type	Material	Dimensions	Designation	Wikidata	Notes
	Bristol with Minerva and Apollo	Portico of 17 Park Street	1824	Edward Hodges Baily	Curved relief frieze	Carrara marble	820 cm long by 80 cm high	Grade II*	Q17553095	Architect;- Charles Robert Cockerell.
	Three figures	Apex of facade of Bristol Museum and Art Gallery	1905		Sculptural group	Limestone		Grade II*		
	Nine Muses	Over doorway to Wills Memorial Building	1925	Reginald Jeffcoat	Sculptural group	Clipshaw stone				
	Remainders of the replica of the Bristol High Cross	Berkeley Square		John Thomas, 1849–51; Harry Hems 1889; Ernest Pascoe 1956.	Eleanor cross	Oolitic limestone				
	Horse and Man	Brunel House, St Georges Road	1984	Stephen Joyce	Sculptural group	Bronze resin				Located in the courtyard of the former Royal Western Hotel, now student accommodation, and the site of a former horse market.
More images	Collected Consciousness	Brandon Hill Park	2013	Pete Moorhouse	Geometric abstract	Cor-ten steel				
	Nipper, His Master's Voice symbol	Corner of Park Row & Woodland Row		Unknown	Sculpture					

== Public art formerly in Bristol ==
Image	Title / subject	Location and coordinates	Date	Artist / designer	Type	Material	Dimensions	Designation	Wikidata	Notes
	George III	Portland Square	1810, destroyed 1813	Attributed to Joseph Panzetta of Coade & Sealy	Statue	Stone				Destroyed by protestors.
More images	Edward Colston	The Centre	1895, toppled 2020	John Cassidy	Statue	Bronze statue on Portland stone plinth		Grade II	Q26497793	Toppled by anti-racism protesters on 7 June 2020, and subsequently thrown into Bristol Harbour.
	Scenes from the life of St Francis of Assisi	Entrance to office complex, Lewin's Mead.	1974, destroyed September 2008	Judith Bluck	Nine relief panels	Cement suspended in polyester resin				Destroyed when the site was redeveloped.
	Oracle	Temple Way House, Narrow Plain	1975,	Franta Belsky	Abstract sculpture	Aluminium filled polyester resin on a concrete base				Removed and sold at auction in 2008.
More images	Sail structure	The Centre 51.453487°N 2.597381°W	1995, destroyed October 2009		Sculptural structure	Wood (frame) and sailcloth (sail)				Originally built in Canon's Marsh for the "Millennium" project to renovate The Centre. The structure would later be moved in 1999 to the Promenade in The Centre, behind the Neptune statue. Despite efforts to restore it, the sail structure was removed in October 2009 due to cracks in the wood.
More images	Broadmead Fabric Sail	St James Place, Broadmead 51.457941°N 2.592110°W	1998, removed June 2026	Architen Landrell	Sculptural structure	Steel (frame) and PVC coated polyester fabric (sail)				Designed as an entrance feature and point of reference for the Broadmead Shopping District. Removed by the Bristol City Council in 2026 to make way for a remodelling of The Hosefair, The Haymarket, and Union Street road junctions.
	Tree of Life	Bristol Zoo	2001	Philip Bews		Cedar wood				Sculpture included animal figures and a relief portrait of Charles Darwin.
More images	Ursa the Bear	St James Barton (Bearpit) 51.459360°N 2.590311°W	2013, dismantled 2019	Jamie Gillman	Sculpture	Recycled timber	12 ft (3.7 m) tall			Removed by the People’s Republic of Stokes Croft and placed in storage after council clearance of the Bearpit.
	A Surge of Power (Jen Reid) 2020	The Centre	Erected 15 July 2020, removed 16 July 2020	Marc Quinn	Statue	Bronze resin				
