= Statue of Edmund Burke =

Statue of Edmund Burke may refer to:

- Statue of Edmund Burke, Bristol, a statue in Bristol, England
- Statue of Edmund Burke (Washington, D.C.), a statue in Washington, D.C., United States
