= Prince Christian Victor Memorial =

War memorial on The Hoe in Plymouth, England

Coordinates: 50°21′59″N 4°08′22″W

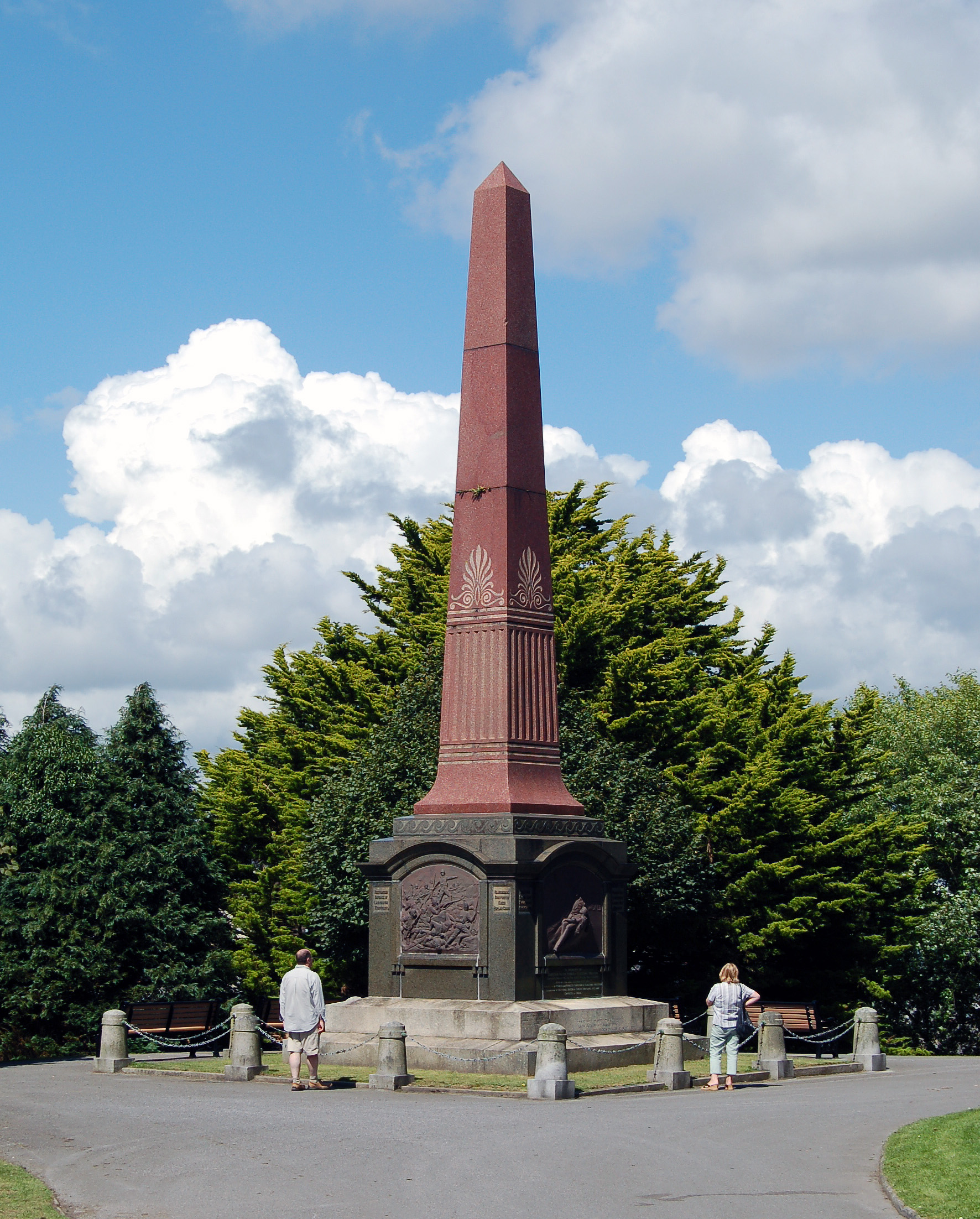
The memorial in 2007

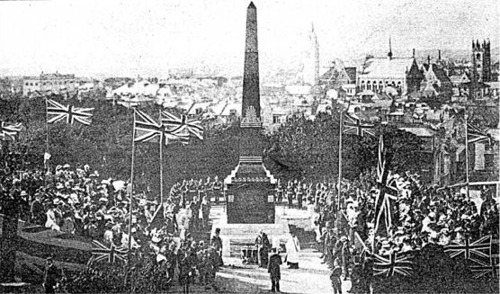
Unveiling in 1903

The Prince Christian Victor Memorial is a war memorial on The Hoe in Plymouth. It was erected in 1902 to commemorate the death of Prince Christian Victor of Schleswig-Holstein, the eldest son of Queen Victoria's third daughter Princess Helena. He died of typhoid fever during the Second Boer War. It became a Grade II listed building in 1975.

The memorial was designed by the architect Frederick William Marks, with three bronze panels made by the sculptor Onslow Whiting and one by Emil Fuchs. It comprises a tall obelisk of pink granite, about 12 m (39 ft) high, in several sections, the third from the bottom decorated with a palmette motif, the next fluted, and the last flaring out to the base. The obelisk stands on a square green granite plinth with plaques, on a lighter grey granite base of two steps.

An inscription on the south face records that its foundation stone was laid by Lady Butler on 4 August 1902, and (now almost illegible) that the completed memorial was unveiled on 8 August 1903 by Lady Audrey Buller, wife of General Redvers Buller.

Each side of the plinth has an arched recess with a bronze panel. The front panel (south) by Fuchs shows two angels lifting a soldier "towards another world" with an inscribed dedication of the memorial to Prince Christian Victor: "IN MEMORY OF / CHRISTIAN VICTOR PRINCE OF SCHLESWIG-HOLSTEIN / CAPTAIN & BREVET MAJOR, THE KING'S ROYAL RIFLE CORPS / DIED AT PRETORIA OCTOBER 29TH 1900, / ELDEST SON OF PRINCE AND PRINCESS CHRITIAN OF SCHLESWIG-HOLSTEIN / GRANDSON OF VICTORIA, QUEEN OF GREAT BRITAIN & IRELAND / EMPRESS OF INDIA".

The other three sides have panels by Whiting which show, on the east and west sides, battles from the Boer War, including one (east) showing an attack by the Devonshire Regiment at Wagon Hill during the Siege of Ladysmith, and the other (west) showing the Somerset Light Infantry and the Gloucestershire Regiment in action; and the rear (north) has an inscription, recording that the memorial was erected by the South Africa diamond merchant Alfred Mosely "TO THE MEMORY OF / CHRISTIAN VICTOR, PRINCE OF / SCHLESWIG-HOLSTEIN, AND / TO THE OFFICERS, NON-COM-/MISSIONED OFFICERS & MEN / OF THE GLOUCESTERSHIRE, / SOMERSET & DEVONSHIRE / REGIMENTS WHO FELL DURING / THE BOER WAR, 1899-1902". A plaster modello for this main inscription panel is held by the National Army Museum.

To the sides of each panel, the granite is inscribed with the names of Boer War battles, with some repetition. On the south side are "COLENSO / SPION KOP / VAALKRANTZE / MONTE CHRISTO" and "PIETER'S HILL / LADYSMITH / LAINGS NEK / BELFAST"; to the east "RIETFONTEIN / DEFENCE OF / LADYSMITH / KIMBERLEY" AND "PAARDEBERG / DRIEFONTEIN / KHEIS / POPLAR GROVE"; on the north side "WITTEBERGEN / JOHANNESBURG / DIAMOND HILL / BOTHAVILLE" and "RELIEF OF / LADYSMITH / TUGELA HEIGHTS / LOMBARD'S KOP "; and to the west "ELANDSLAAGTE / WAGON HILL / LADYSMITH / BERGENDAL" and "COLENSO / SPION KOP / LAINGS NEK / TUGELA HEIGHTS".

The memorial is set on a small square of grass delimited by low chains hanging between granite bollards, at the east end of Hoe Park below the north west bastion of the Royal Citadel.
