= Christ Church, Clifton Down =

Christ Church, Clifton
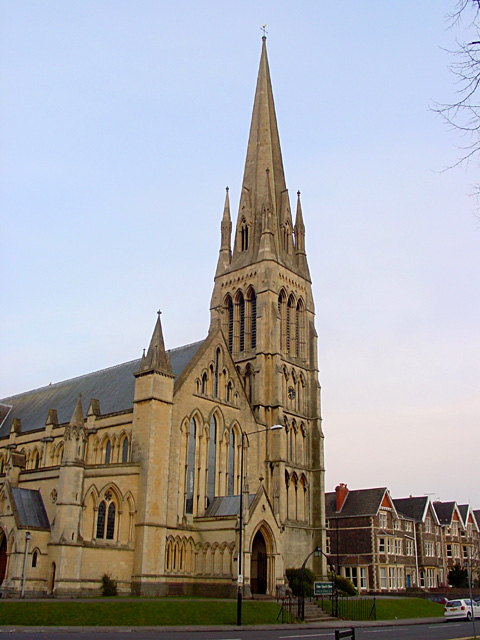
- Christ Church, Clifton
- Country: England
- Denomination: Anglican
- Tradition: Evangelical

Architecture
- Architect: Charles Dyer
- Completed: 1841

Administration
- Diocese: Bristol
- Archdeaconry: Bristol
- Deanery: Bristol West
- Benefice: Clifton, Christ Church with Emmanuel

Clergy
- Vicar: Revd Matt Southcombe

Christ Church (grid reference ST571739) is a Church of England parish church in Clifton, Bristol, England. It has been designated as a Grade II* listed building.

== History ==
The church was built in 1841 by Charles Dyer. The steeple was built in 1859 by John Norton, and the aisles in 1885 by William Basset Smith.

A Christian mission organised here is credited with inspiring Emma Saunders to devote her life to good works. She spent fifty years as the "Railwayman's Friend" in Bristol starting in 1878.

In 2015 the church was closed for two weeks after the steeple was damaged in high winds.

The Anglican parish is part of the benefice of Christ Church with Emmanuel, Clifton which falls within the Diocese of Bristol. It is affiliated with the New Wine Network. Having formerly been conservative evangelical, the church now accepts women in roles of leadership and public ministry.

== Architecture ==
The cruciform limestone building has a slate roof. It was built in the Early English Gothic Revival style. There is an octagonal apse. The north transept is supported by buttresses.

The steeple above the five-stage tower reaches 65 metres (213 ft). At its base is a doorway with Purbeck marble shafts. Inside the church is a west gallery supported by cast iron columns with timber cladding.

A replica of the church exists in Thames Town, a suburb of Shanghai built in a style imitative of English architecture.

== Archives ==
Parish records for Christ Church, Clifton, Bristol are held at Bristol Archives (Ref. P.CC) (online catalogue) including baptism and marriage registers. The archive also includes records of the incumbent, churchwardens, parochial church council, charities and vestry.

== See also ==
- List of tallest buildings and structures in Bristol
- Churches in Bristol
- Grade II* listed buildings in Bristol
