= Ursula Edgcumbe =

British sculptor and painter (1900-1985)

- Born: 1900; Sandy, Bedfordshire, England
- Died: 1985 (aged 84–85)
- Education: Slade School of Art
- Known for: Sculpture and painting

Ursula Ulalia Edgcumbe (1900 – 8 February 1985) was a British sculptor and painter. As a sculptor she worked in stone, wood and bronze while, after switching to painting, many of her works depicted birds and groups of figures.

== Biography ==
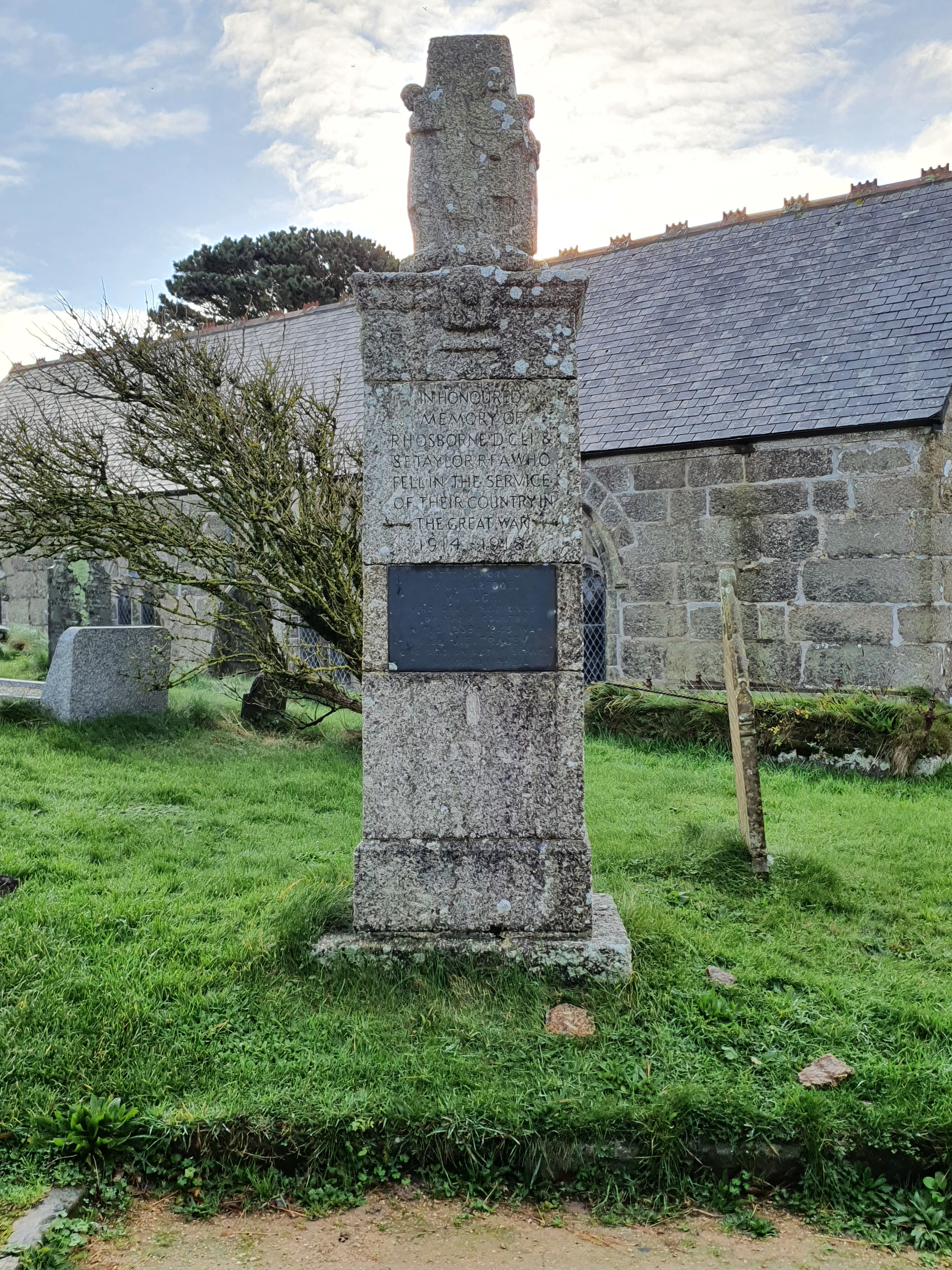
Zennor War Memorial, Cornwall

Edgcumbe was born at Sandy in Bedfordshire where her father was the barrister and local politician Sir Robert Pearce-Edgcumbe (1851–1929). As a teenager, Ursula Edgcumbe worked in the studio of the sculptor James Havard Thomas before enrolling at the Slade School of Art, where Thomas also taught. Edgcumbe was at the Slade from 1916 until 1921 during which time she won the scholarship prize for sculpture in 1918. She then worked as an architectural carver, often with the architect George L Kennedy. An early commission was for the war memorial at Zennor in Cornwall. Working in the local granite, Edgcumbe produced a frieze surmounted on a column designed by Kennedy. Another early commission was for a fireplace frieze at Bilbury Court in Gloucestershire.

Throughout her career, Edgcumbe exhibited with the London Group, the Royal Society of British Artists, the Women's International Art Club and was, in 1929, a founding member of the National Society of Painters, Sculptors, Engravers and Potters. She had her first solo sculpture show at the Leger Galleries in April 1936 but abandoned sculpture for painting in 1940. After the end of World War II, Edgcumbe concentrated on painting, mostly birds and industrial scenes, and had several solo exhibitions of her paintings at leading London galleries.

In 1977, Edgcumbe married the philosopher, humanist, and educationist H. J. Blackham. By this time, she had been actively involved with the humanist movement and the British Humanist Association (now Humanists UK) for nearly three decades, including as a contributor to the essay collection Living as a Humanist (1950) and The Plain View.

A memorial exhibition of Edgcumbe's paintings and sculpture was held at the Gillian Jason Gallery in 1986.
