= Emil Fuchs (artist) =

Austrian-American sculptor and painter (1866–1929)

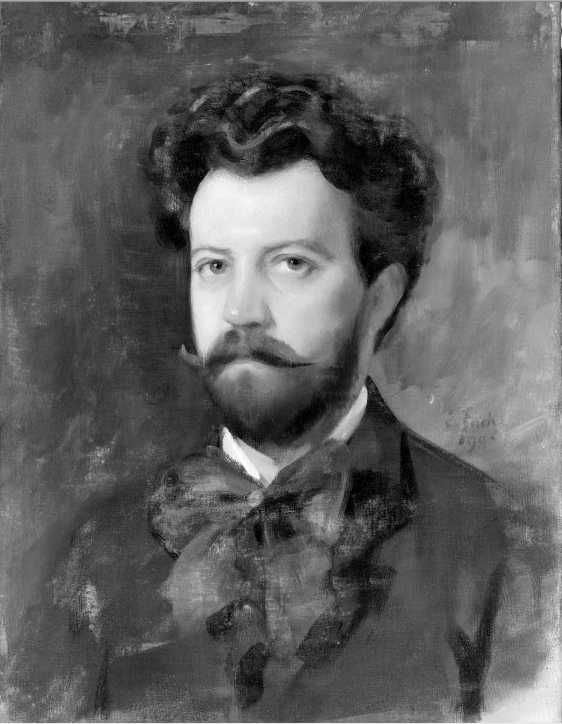
Self-portrait (1905), at the Brooklyn Museum.

Emil Fuchs MVO (9 August 1866 – 13 January 1929) was an Austrian–American sculptor, medallist, painter, and author who worked in Vienna, London, and New York. He painted portraits of Queen Victoria and Edward VII and was fashionable among London high society in the early 20th century.

== Biography ==
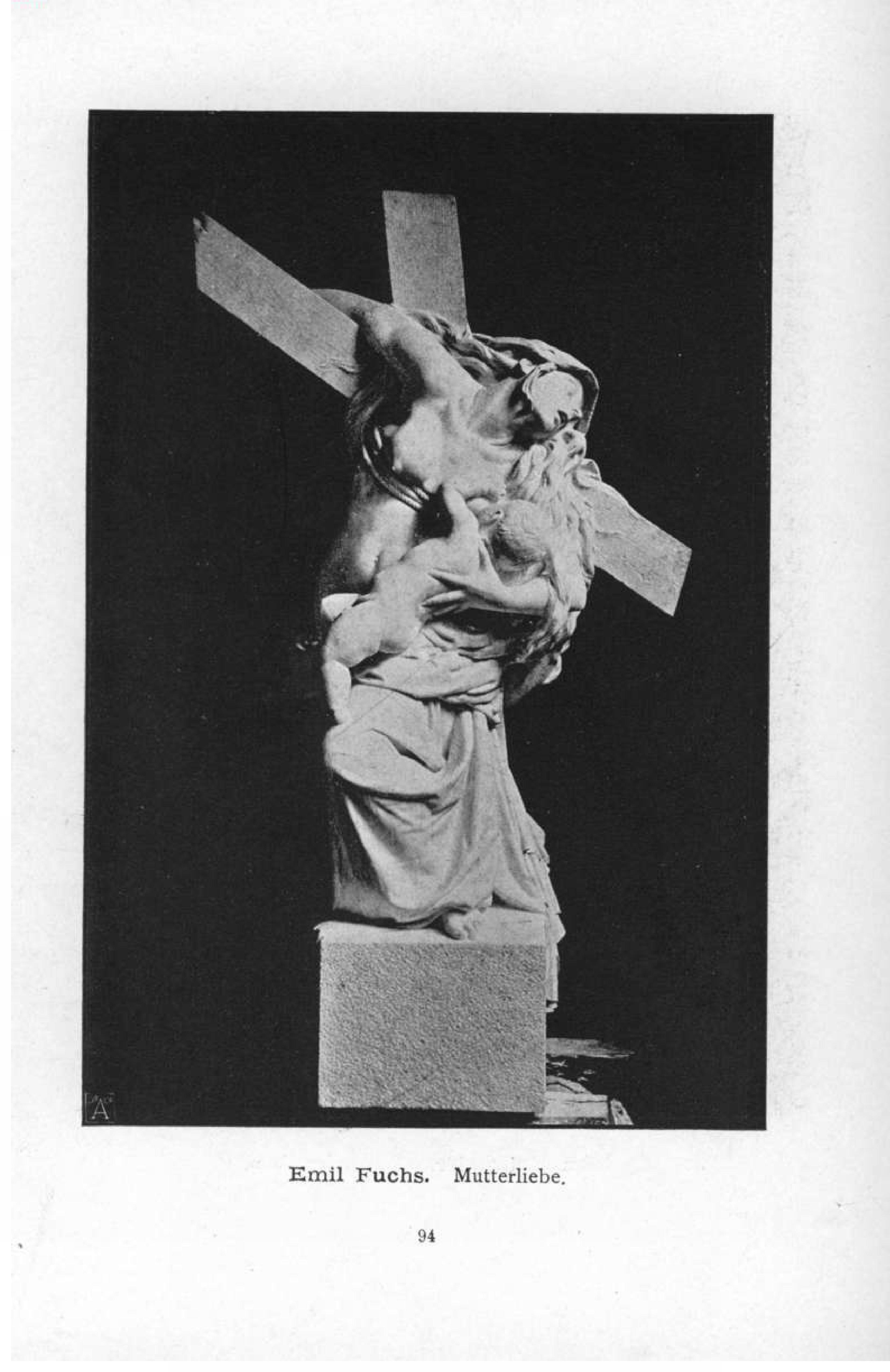
Mutterliebe, 1896 Brooklyn Museum

=== Austria, Germany, Rome ===
He was born in Vienna on 9 August 1866. During his years in Austria, Germany and Rome he was a sculptor and medallist who eventually began to study painting as well. He studied at the Academy of Fine Arts Vienna under Edmund von Hellmer and Viktor Oskar Tilgner. He then attended the Prussian Academy of Arts in Berlin where he studied under Fritz Schaper and Anton von Werner. From 1891 to 1897 he was in Rome, having won the German Prix de Rome in 1891. While in Rome he had an affair with Elvira Fraternali; this is referred to in the film D'Annunzio. He had a sister Renee, and was brother-in-law of Gustav Freytag.

=== England ===
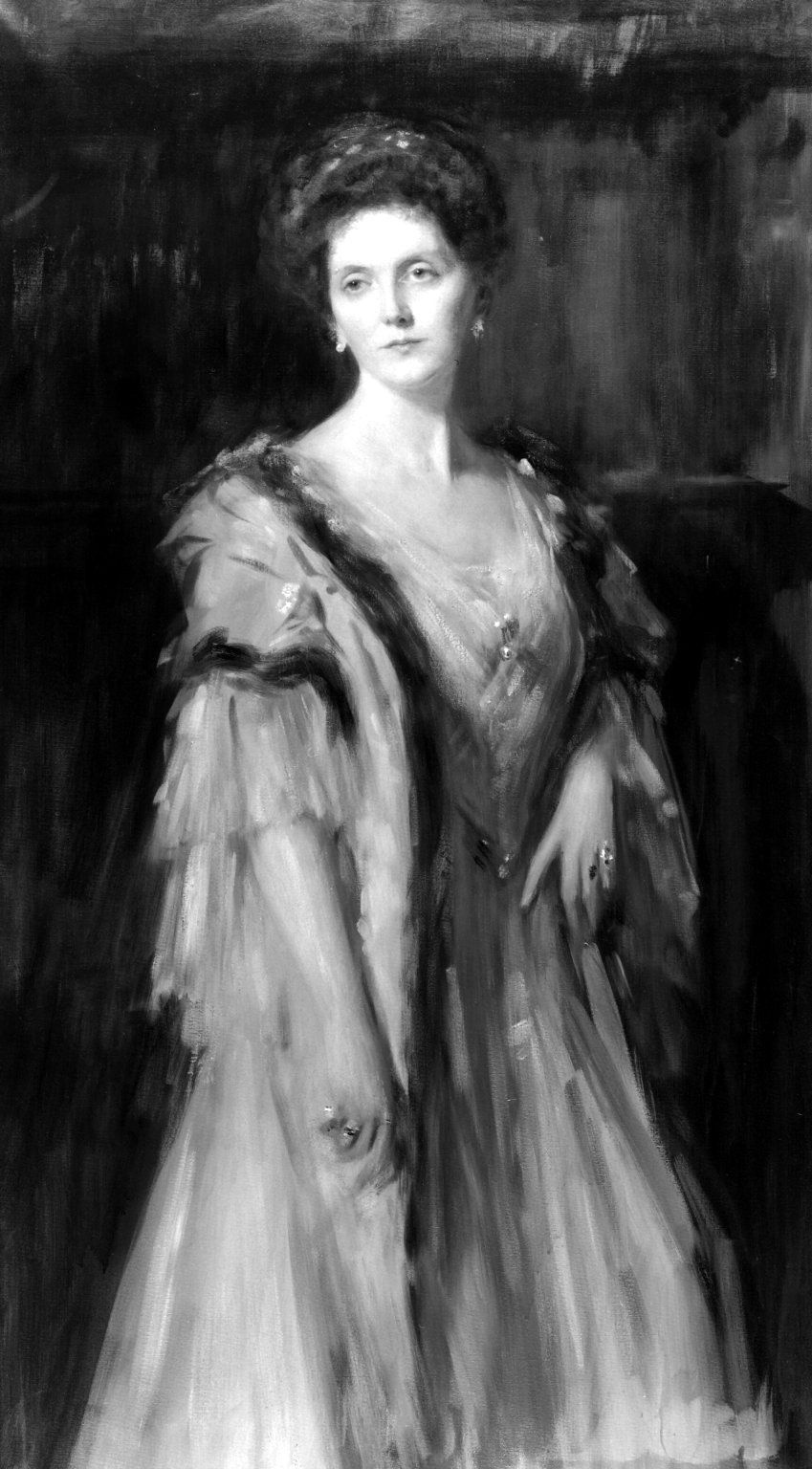
Emily Post ca.1906 Brooklyn Museum

From 1897 to 1915 his address was in London where he regularly met with the artist Lawrence Alma-Tadema. He had been mainly a sculptor and medallist, but he began oil painting, especially portraiture in oils, in 1897; his early mentor was John Singer Sargent. He exhibited works at the Royal Academy of Arts in 1898 and he taught there. He worked on commissions including portraits for Queen Victoria and Edward VII, and his portraits became fashionable among various patrons from the aristocracy and high society. He was honoured with the Royal Victorian Order (MVO) in 1909. While in England he was employed by the Birmingham Mint. By 1905 he had been teaching at Paris, Berlin, Munich, Vienna, and Rome and was making winter trips to the United States.

=== United States ===
Fuchs began going to the United States in 1905, primarily to paint portraits of wealthy socialites. In 1915 during World War I, "a wave of anti-German sentiment" swept England so, to escape it he moved permanently to New York, producing more works there and offering assistance with the war effort. He became a US citizen in 1924. He had surgery for cancer in 1928, and in anticipation of a death with great suffering he shot himself at the Hotel des Artistes in New York on 13 January 1929, aged 62. His will created a foundation which put his art on view as a permanent exhibit, and for this he left $500,000 plus artworks to the public.

== Artwork ==
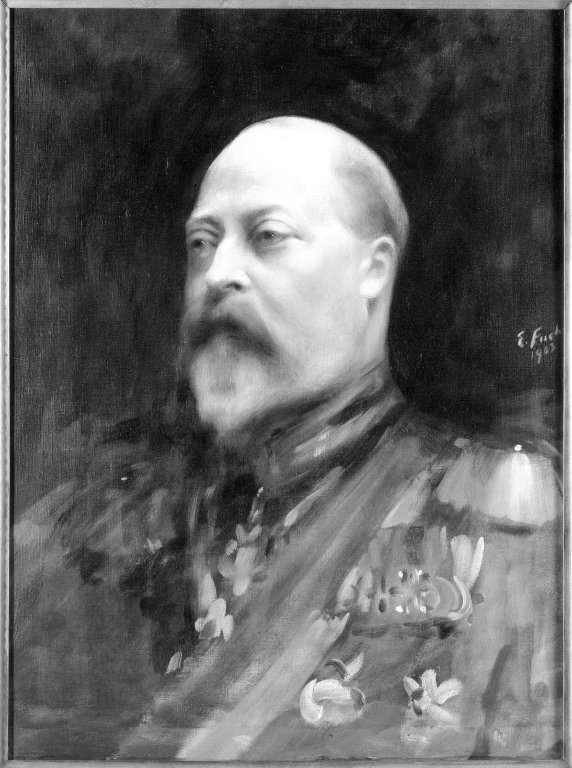
Edward VII, 1903 Brooklyn Museum

During his career in Vienna, Berlin, Rome, England and New York he created portrait busts, figurines, memorials, medals, oil paintings and other works of art. Collections of his work are held at the American Numismatic Society, Brooklyn Museum, the Metropolitan Museum of Art, the Thomas J. Watson Library and the Library of Congress.

=== Exhibitions ===
Between 1898 and 1902 he showed fourteen works over seven Royal Academy summer exhibitions. This included busts, figure groups, figurines, medals, and marble and bronze plaquettes. In 1898 he exhibited marble busts of Lady Alice Montagu and Mr Carl Meyer at the autumn exhibition in the Walker Art Gallery in Liverpool. In 1900 at the same gallery he exhibited a portrait of Arthur W. Pinero and a bronze sculpture called Grip of Death, and in 1901 a bronze head. In 1901 at the RA summer exhibition he showed a case of medals including "portraits of Her late Majesty Queen Victoria, H. M. King Edward VII., Lord Roberts, General Sir George White, General Baden-Powell, and the Peace Medal, of which two varieties exist". In 1902 he had a one-man exhibition at the Grafton Galleries, London.

=== Works ===
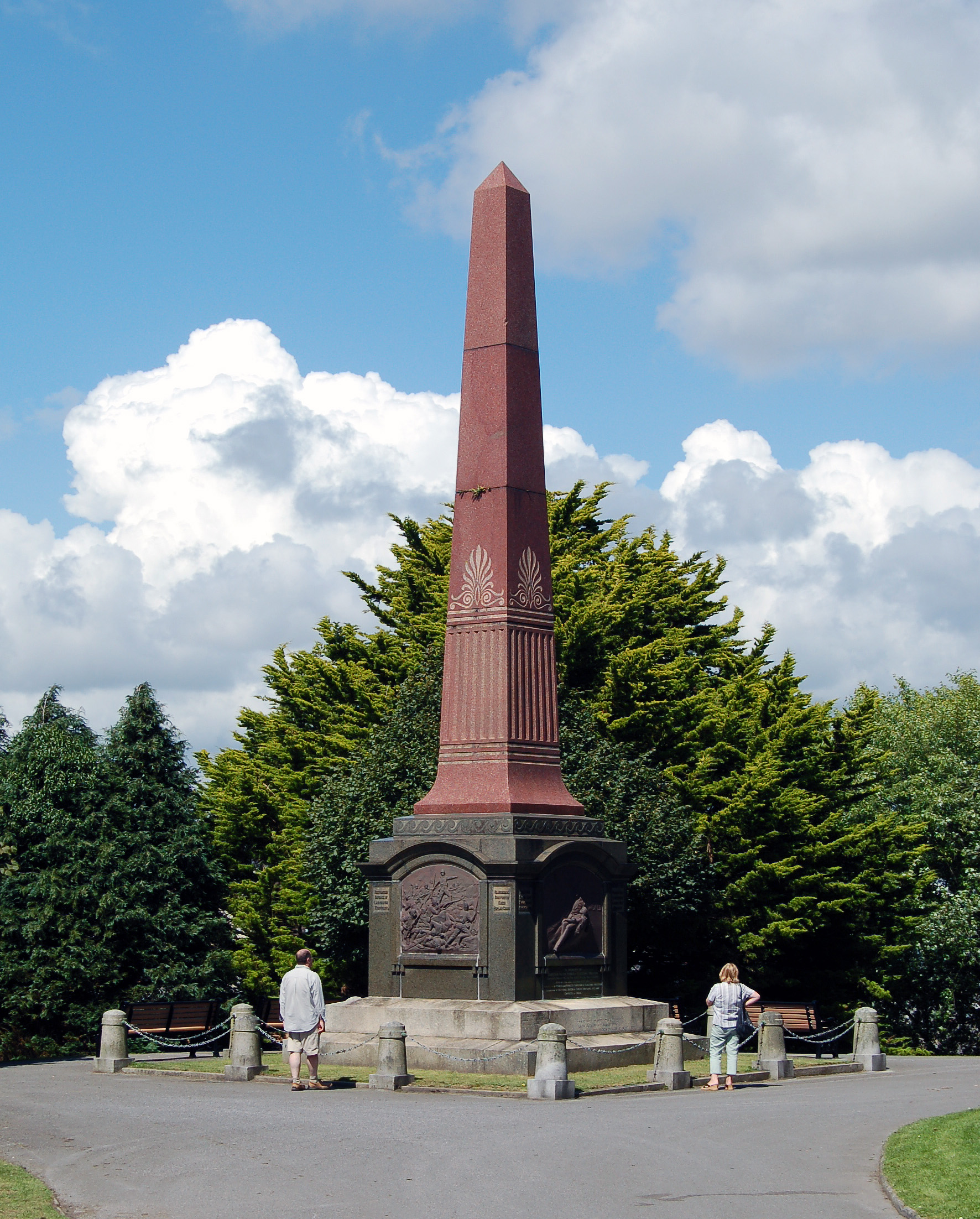
Prince Christian Victor Memorial, Plymouth, 1903

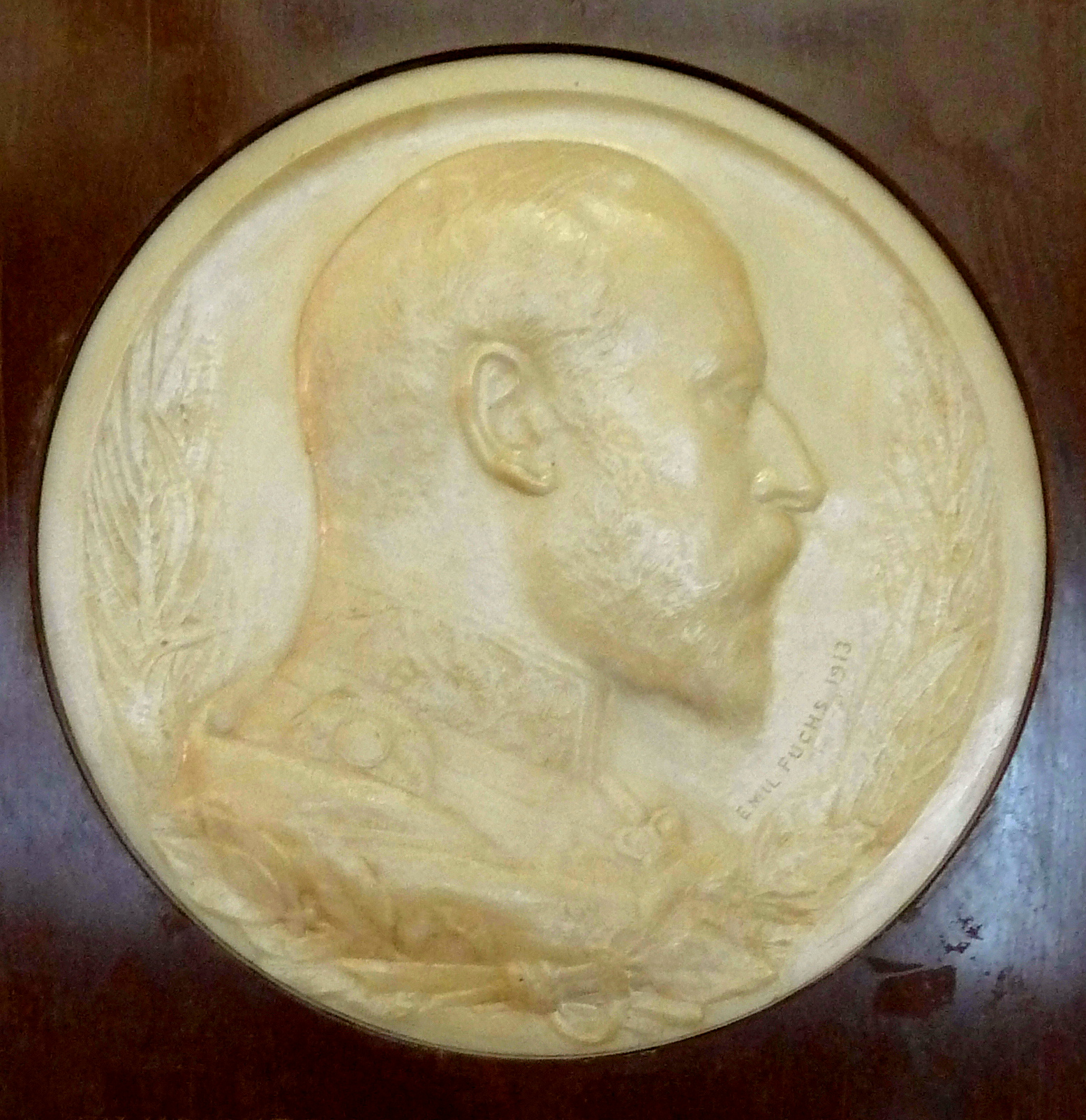
Plaque of Edward VII, The King's Hall, Herne Bay, 1913

The following is a selection of his work:

- Memorial to Prince Christian Victor (d.1900) at St George's Chapel, Windsor.
- Medals showing Alexandra of Denmark, commissioned by Queen Victoria (d.1901), at the Brooklyn Museum.
- Oil painting of Queen Victoria lying in state (1901), at Brooklyn Museum.
- Several medallions commissioned by Queen Victoria (d.1901), Edward VII (d.1910) and Queen Alexandra (d.1925).
- King Edward VII Coronation Medal (1902) at the Tate Gallery and the Brooklyn Museum.
- Plymouth's memorial to Prince Christian Victor and the fallen of the Second Boer War (1903).
- Portrait in oils of Edward VII (1903) for his Prussian regiment at the Brooklyn Museum.
- King Edward VII penny postage stamp (1902–1910).
- Portrait of Mrs Phil Benkard (1907)
- Medal commemorating the fiftieth anniversary of the American Numismatic Society (1908), at The Metropolitan Museum of Art.
- Circular Carrara marble memorial plaques of Edward VII (d.1910) executed at Sandringham and Copenhagen for Alexandra of Denmark (1910–1913), and a replica plaque carved for the opening of The King's Hall, Herne Bay, Kent (1913).
- A bust of Lord Wolseley (d.1913) (between 1897 and 1915).
- A design for the cover of The Saturday Evening Post (undated: between 1905 and 1929).
- A bronze statue of Henry J. Heinz was dedicated at the Heinz Company building in Pittsburgh, Pennsylvania on October 11, 1924.
- The Hudson-Fulon Celebration Medal (1909)

A selection of Fuchs' sculptures can be found in:

- Metropolitan Museum of Art, New York City
- Cleveland Museum of Art, Cleveland, Ohio
- Seattle Art Museum, Seattle, Washington
- National Academy of Design, New York City

A selection of Fuchs' paintings can be found at:

- Pioneers' Museum, Colorado Springs, Colorado
- Yale University, Sheffield Scientific School, New Haven, Connecticut
- Raydon Gallery, New York City
- Newark Museum, Newark, New Jersey
- Brooklyn Museum, Brooklyn, New York

A selection of Fuchs' medallic art can be found at:

- The American Numismatic Society, New York City

== Bibliography ==
- Fuchs, Emil, The work of Emil Fuchs; illustrating some of his representative paintings, sculpture, medals and studies. "Issued on the occasion of an exhibition of his works under the auspices of Messrs. Cartier, February 7th to March 5th, 1921." (New York city, 1921)
- Fuchs, Emil, With Pencil, Brush and Chisel: The life of an artist (Putnam NY, 1925) ISBN 9781406776621.
- Simmons, William, "Emil Fuchs and Etching," in The Print Connoisseur (1929).
