= Statue of Edmund Burke, Bristol =

Statue in Bristol, England, by James Havard Thomas

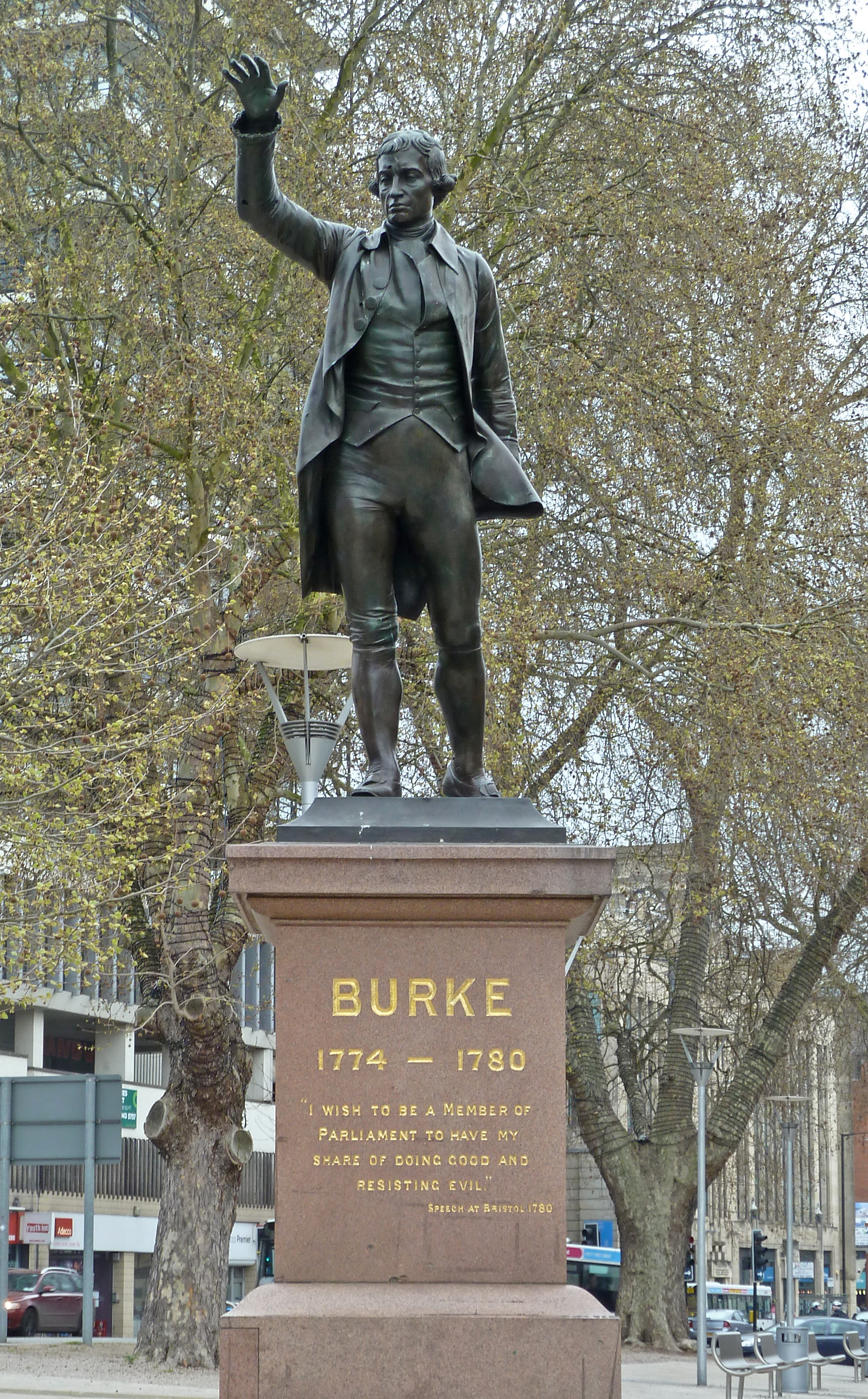
The statue in 2012

The statue of Edmund Burke in Bristol, England, is a commemorative bronze sculpture of Edmund Burke (1729–1797) standing in The Centre. It was created in 1894 by James Havard Thomas and is grade II listed.

A second copy of the sculpture stands on Massachusetts Avenue in Washington, D.C., United States. It has been said incorrectly that the statue is a copy of an 1858 marble work in the Palace of Westminster; that marble statue is by William Theed, the younger.

The bronze statue stands on a red granite plinth with the inscription "BURKE / 1774–1780 / I wish to be an MP to have my share of doing good and resisting evil / Speech at Bristol 1780". Burke was a Member of Parliament for Bristol from 1774 to 1780.

The National Heritage List for England record for the statue of Edward Colston, which until June 2020 stood nearby, gives as one of its reasons for listing the "group value with other Bristol memorials: a statue of Edmund Burke, the Cenotaph, and a drinking fountain commemorating the Industrial and Fine Art Exhibition of 1893", referring to this statue, the Bristol Cenotaph and the 1893 Exhibition fountain.
