= Statue of Edmund Burke (Washington, D.C.) =

Statue by James Havard Thomas in Washington, D.C., U.S.

- Edmund Burke
- U.S. Historic district – Contributing property
- D.C. Inventory of Historic Sites
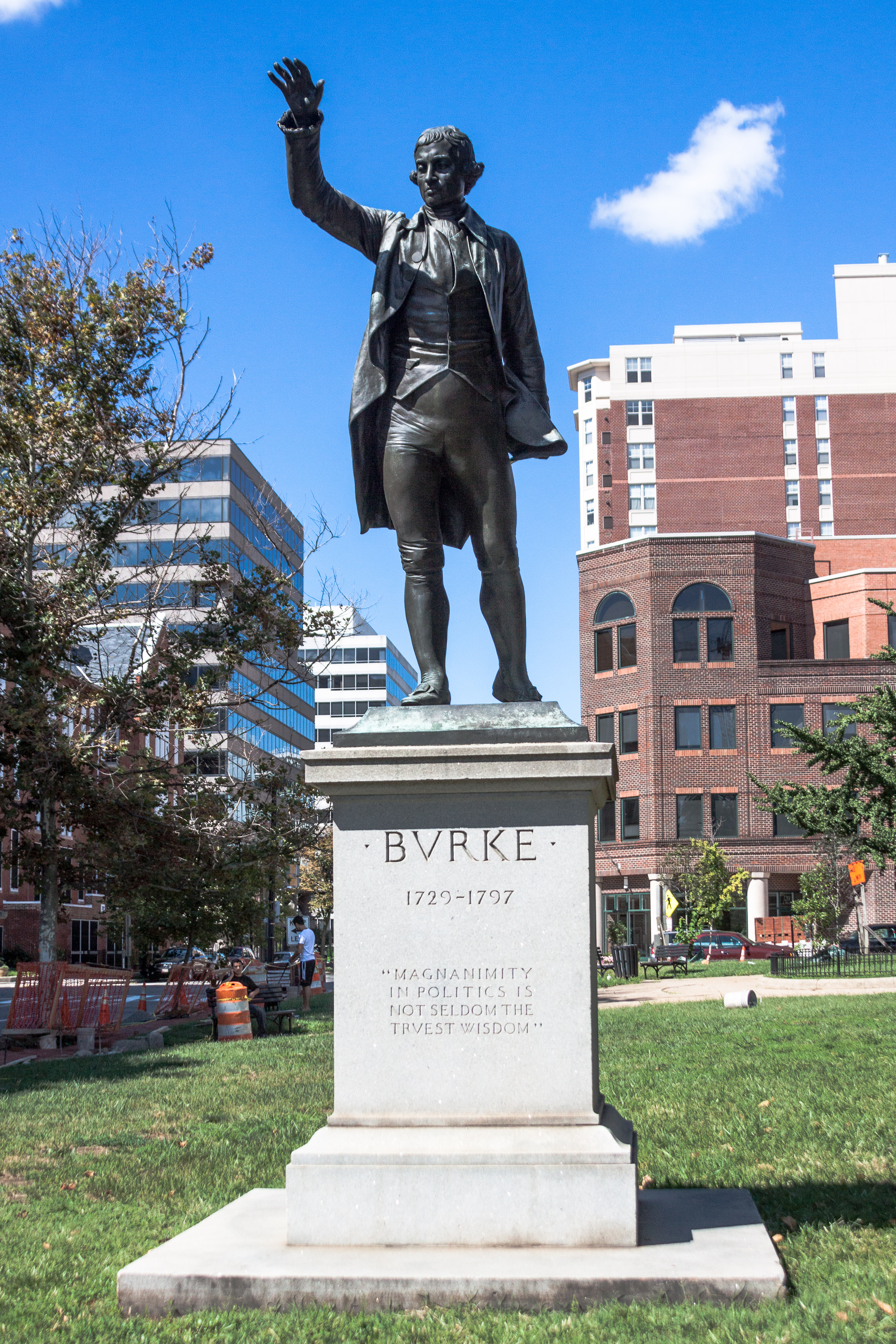
- Statue of Edmund Burke in 2012
- Location: 11th Street, L Street, and Massachusetts Avenue NW, Washington, D.C.
- Coordinates: 38°54′14″N 77°1′38.8″W
- Built: 1894, second cast 1922
- Architect: James Havard Thomas (statue); Horace Peaslee (base); H.H. Martyn & Co. (founder); New England Granite Works (fabricator)
- Part of: • American Revolution Statuary (78000256) • L'Enfant Plan (97000332) • Mount Vernon West Historic District (99001071)

Significant dates
- Designated CP: • July 14, 1978 (American Revolution Statuary) • April 24, 1997 (L'Enfant Plan) • September 9, 1999 (Mount Vernon West Historic District)
- Designated DCIHS: • March 3, 1979 (American Revolution Statuary) • April 24, 1997 (L'Enfant Plan) • July 22, 1999 (Mount Vernon West Historic District)

Edmund Burke is a bronze, full-length statue of British statesman, author, orator, political theorist, and philosopher Edmund Burke, created by British artist James Havard Thomas. The statue in Washington, D.C., is a cast of the original in Bristol, England. In Washington, it stands in Burke Park at the intersection of 11th Street, L Street, and Massachusetts Avenue NW, on the southern border of the Shaw neighborhood. The statue was a gift from Charles Wakefield, 1st Viscount Wakefield, on behalf of the Sulgrave Institution, an organization that promoted United Kingdom–United States relations by exchanging statues and busts between the two countries.

Burke was an influential philosopher and intellectual. After working as a private secretary for Prime Minister Charles Watson-Wentworth, 2nd Marquess of Rockingham, Burke was elected to the House of Commons, where he would often give powerful speeches during his 30-year tenure. During the lead-up to the American Revolutionary War, he often spoke about the hardships Britain imposed on the Thirteen Colonies. Burke feared if a war took place, Britain would lose. Following the British defeat, Burke attempted to mend the relationship with the newly formed United States by promoting peace treaties and trade.

The statue of Burke is 8 feet tall (2.4 m) and stands on a pedestal designed by Horace Peaslee. It was formally dedicated in October 1922. The statue is one of 14 sculptures in the American Revolution Statuary in Washington, D.C., that were collectively listed on the National Register of Historic Places in 1978 and the District of Columbia Inventory of Historic Sites the following year. The statue is a contributing property to the L'Enfant Plan and the Mount Vernon West Historic District, also known as the Shaw Historic District.

== History ==
=== Biography ===
Edmund Burke was born around 1729 in Dublin, Ireland, and later received his education at Trinity College Dublin. While at school, he established a debate group, the precursor to the College Historical Society. In the 1750s, Burke began writing, starting with A Vindication of Natural Society, followed by A Philosophical Enquiry into the Origin of Our Ideas of the Sublime and Beautiful. Although he had some success as a writer, Burke began dabbling in politics instead. He acted as the private secretary to William Gerard Hamilton and, beginning in 1765, to Charles Watson-Wentworth, 2nd Marquess of Rockingham, who was Prime Minister at the time.

Burke was elected to the House of Commons later that year, which marked the start of a 30-year career in Parliament. He became an active PM, advocating for religious tolerance, finance reform, liberty, and the affairs of the Thirteen Colonies. He adamantly opposed the heavy taxation imposed on the colonies, and often defended them while speaking in Parliament. Although he never called for the independence of the colonies, he believed that starting a war with them would lead to a British defeat.

When the American Revolutionary War began, Burke continued defending the colonies. Because his political party, the Whigs, was out of power during the war, the Tories and King George III were responsible for the continuation and eventual loss of the colonies. Burke tried to soften the hostility between Great Britain and the newly formed United States of America by encouraging trade and peace between the two countries. He served as Paymaster of the Forces and Rector of the University of Glasgow during his later years. Burke died in 1797, leaving a legacy that has inspired many conservatives who regard him as "one of the great philosophers of the Enlightenment".

=== Planning and dedication ===
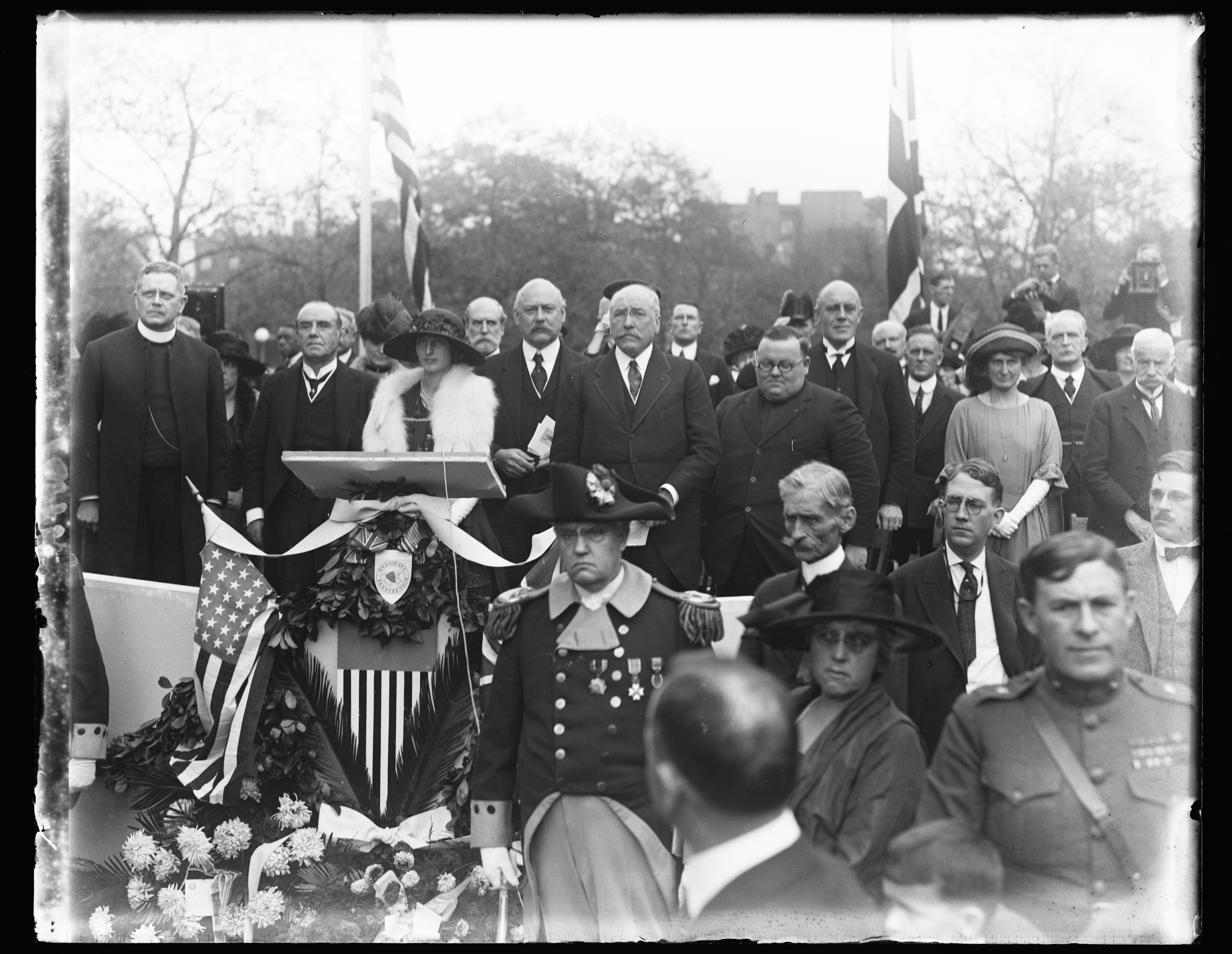
Attendees, including British officials, at the statue's dedication in 1922

In the 1920s, the Sulgrave Institution was formed to promote the bond between the United Kingdom and United States. The organization, on behalf of Charles Wakefield, 1st Viscount Wakefield, the former Lord Mayor of London and member of the Sulgrave Institution, gifted the statue of Edmond Burke, who had advocated for better relations with the Thirteen Colonies when it was engulfed in war. The statue they chose was a cast of the 1894 statue of Edmund Burke in Bristol, England. Sculpted by James Havard Thomas, the idea behind the installation of the statue was to help strengthen the bonds between the two countries after they worked together during World War I. One way to do this was by exchanging busts and statues of well-known British and American people in each other's countries. These included works depicting Alexander Hamilton, Abraham Lincoln, William Pitt the Younger, and former US ambassador to the UK, Joseph Hodges Choate.

On April 25, 1922, an Act of Congress approved the statue's installation. The architect chosen to design the statue's base was Horace Peaslee, although it was not installed until June 1923. A temporary base was sculpted by Frederick D. Owen. The original statue was founded by H.H. Martyn & Co. and the stonework was completed by New England Granite Works. The statue was installed in September 1922, but the official unveiling and dedication ceremony did not take place until October 12 of that year. A few weeks before the ceremony, it was announced that children from the nearby Webster School and Thomson School would participate by singing songs and waving flags.

Reverend George C. F. Bratenahl of the Washington Cathedral delivered the invocation for the ceremony. British and American diplomats, including the UK ambassador, Auckland Geddes, 1st Baron Geddes, joined others at the event. Prominent attendees included Secretary Charles Evans Hughes and Samuel Gompers. Both Wakefield and Secretary John W. Weeks gave speeches praising Burke and the UK-US relations. Weeks accepted the statue on behalf of all Americans. Reverend John I. Barrett from St. Patrick's Catholic Church gave the benediction.

=== Later history ===
The statue is one of 14 sculptures in the American Revolution Statuary that were collectively listed on the National Register of Historic Places (NRHP) on July 14, 1978. The statuary was added to the District of Columbia Inventory of Historic Sites (DCIHS) on March 3, 1979. Because it is located on government-owned property, the statue is a contributing property to the L'Enfant Plan, listed on the NRHP and DCIHS on April 24, 1997. The statue is a contributing property to the Mount Vernon West Historic District, also known as the Shaw Historic District, which was added to the DCIHS on July 22, 1999, followed by the NRHP a few months later on September 9, 1999.

== Location and design ==
The statue is located in Reservation 68, a triangular plot of land named Burke Park. The park is located at the intersection of 11th Street, L Street, and Massachusetts Avenue NW, on the southern border of the Shaw neighborhood. In 2012, several trees were planted in the park. Because the park is owned by the federal government, the statue is maintained by the National Park Service.

The full length sculpture of Burke, which measures 8 feet tall (2.4 m), depicts him stepping forward with his right leg. He is waving his right hand, and in his left hand he holds a three-cornered hat at his side. He wears a long jacket, a vest, and breeches. His hair curls up above his ears and is parted down the middle. The sculpture sits upon a rectangular granite base which measures 6 feet (1.8 m) by 7.7 feet (2.3 m). The bottom of the statue is signed: I. HAVARD THOMAS FECIT MDCCCXCIV CAST Á CIRE PERDVE H.H. MARTYN & Co. Ltd. Cheltenham 1922.

The front (east) side of the base is inscribed with:

BVRKE

1729–1797
"MAGNANIMITY
IN POLITICS IS
NOT SELDOM THE
TRVEST WISDOM"

The west side of the base is inscribed with:

THIS STATVE

A COPY OF THE WORK
OF HAVARD THOMAS IN
THE CITY OF BRISTOL
ENGLAND WAS PRESENT-
ED THROVGH THE SVL-
GRAVE INSTITVTION TO
THE PEOPLE OF AMERICA
BY SIR CHARLES CHEERS
WAKEFIELD BARONET
FORMERLY LORD MAYOR
OF LONDON
ERECTED A.D. 1922

== Gallery ==
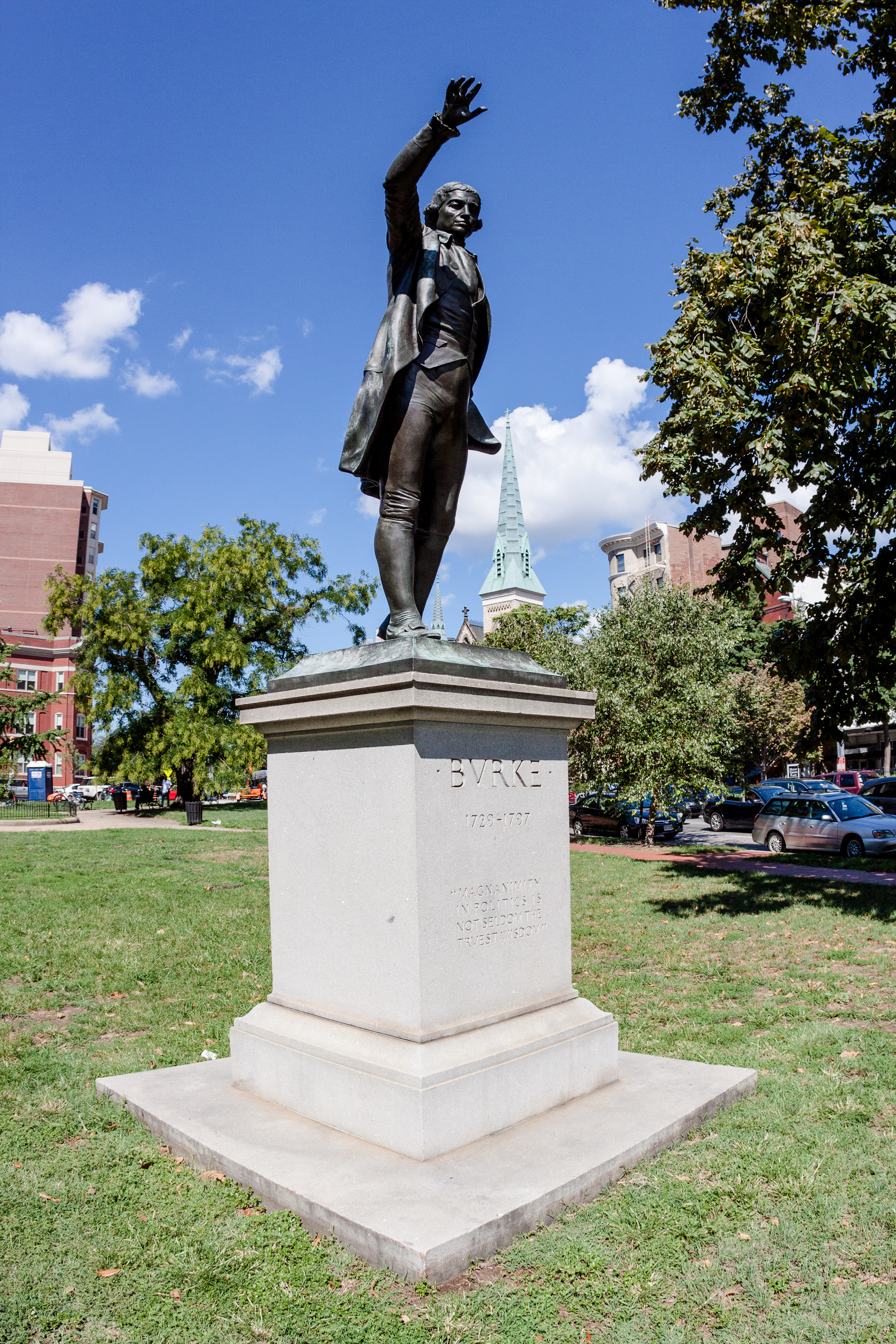
Full-angled view

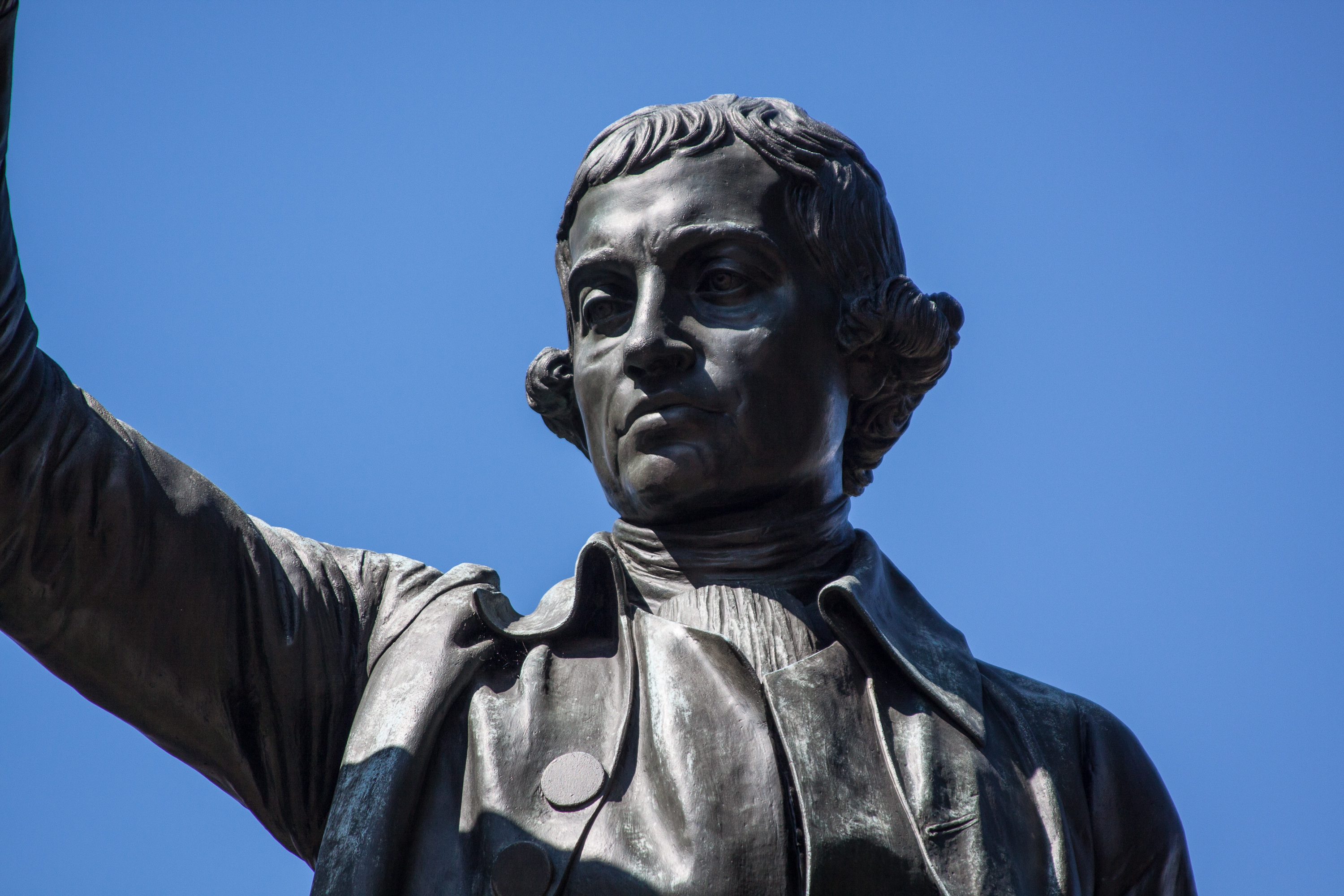
Closeup

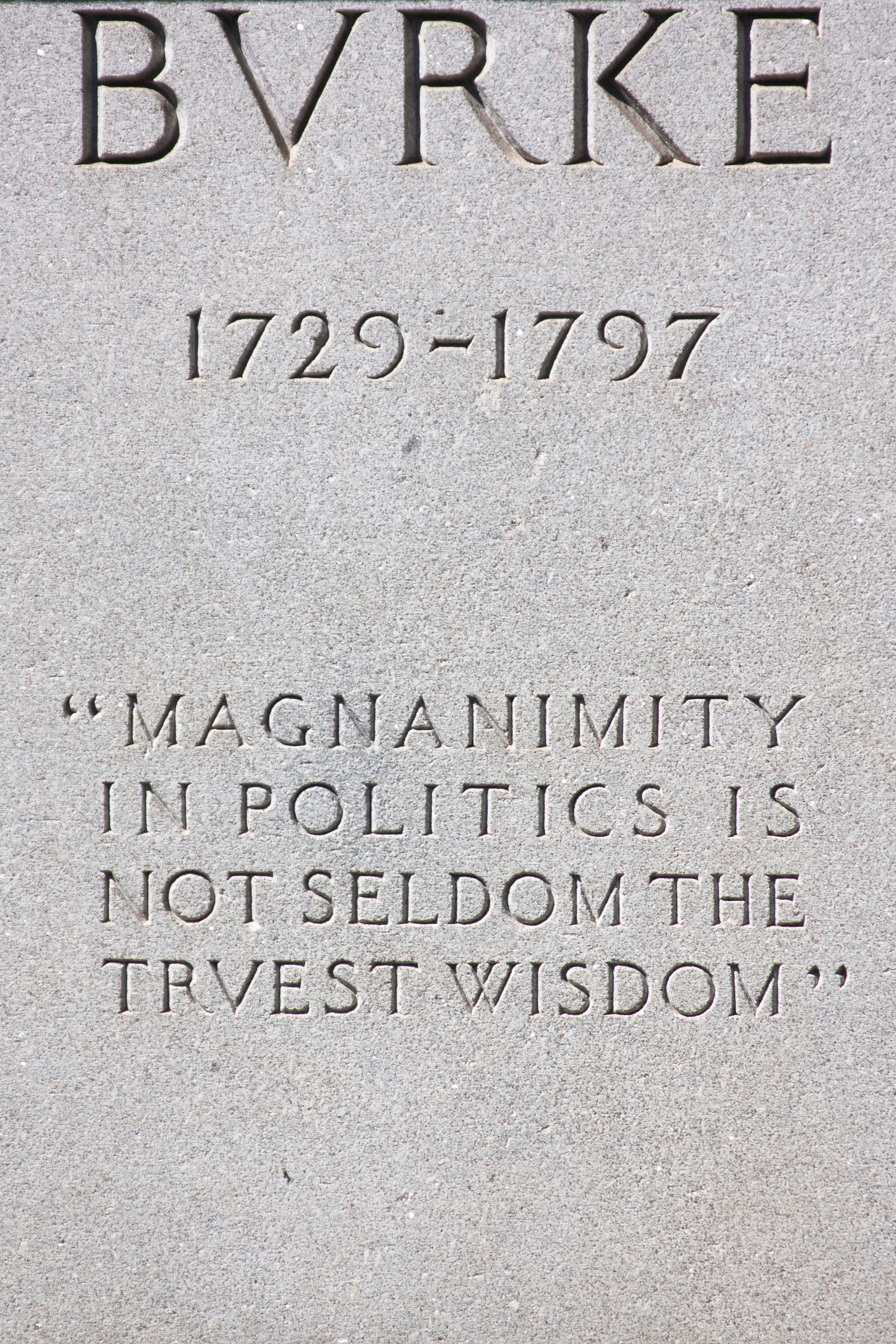
Front inscription

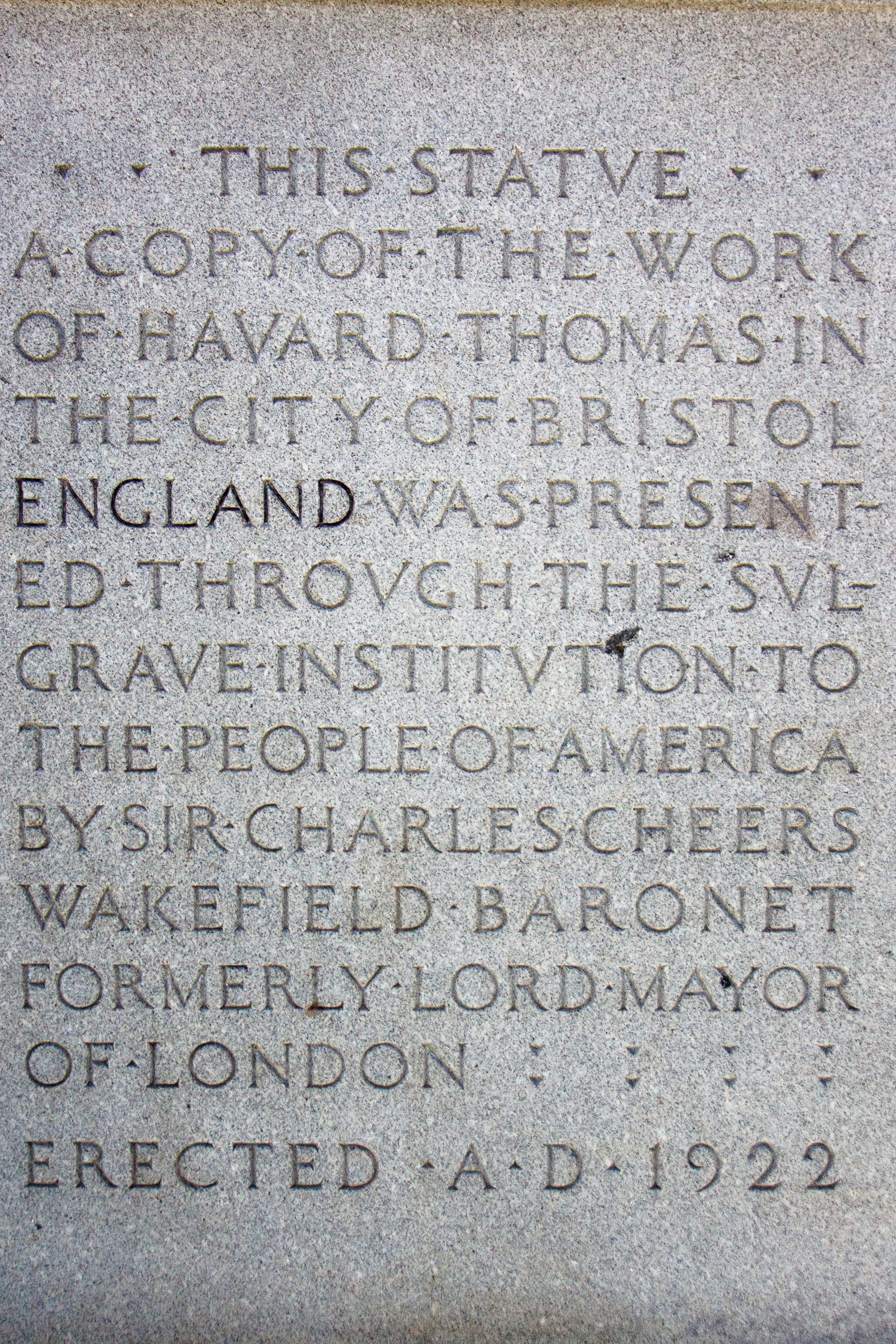
Back inscription

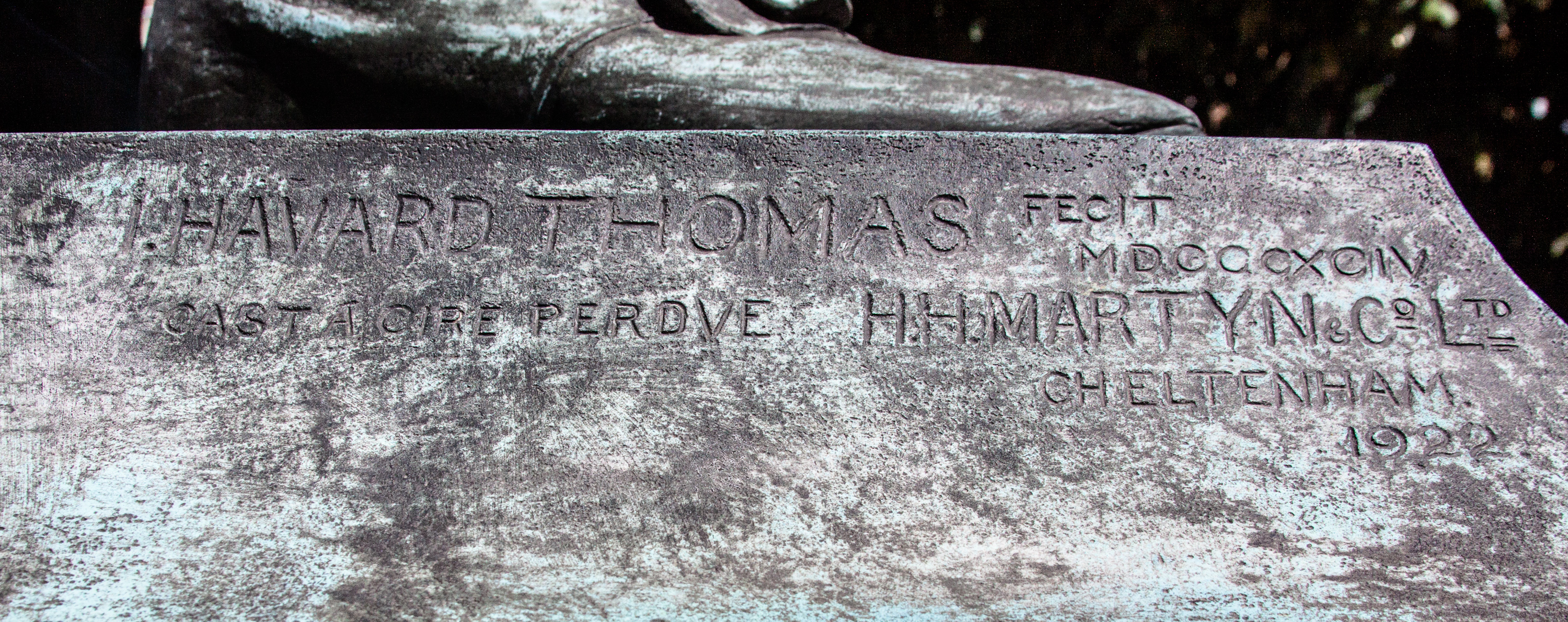
Sculptor signature and founder data

== See also ==
- List of public art in Washington, D.C., Ward 2
- National Register of Historic Places in Washington, D.C.
- Outdoor sculpture in Washington, D.C.
