= Statue of Queen Victoria, Bristol =

Statue in Bristol, England

Coordinates: 51.45220°N 2.59941°W

Queen Victoria
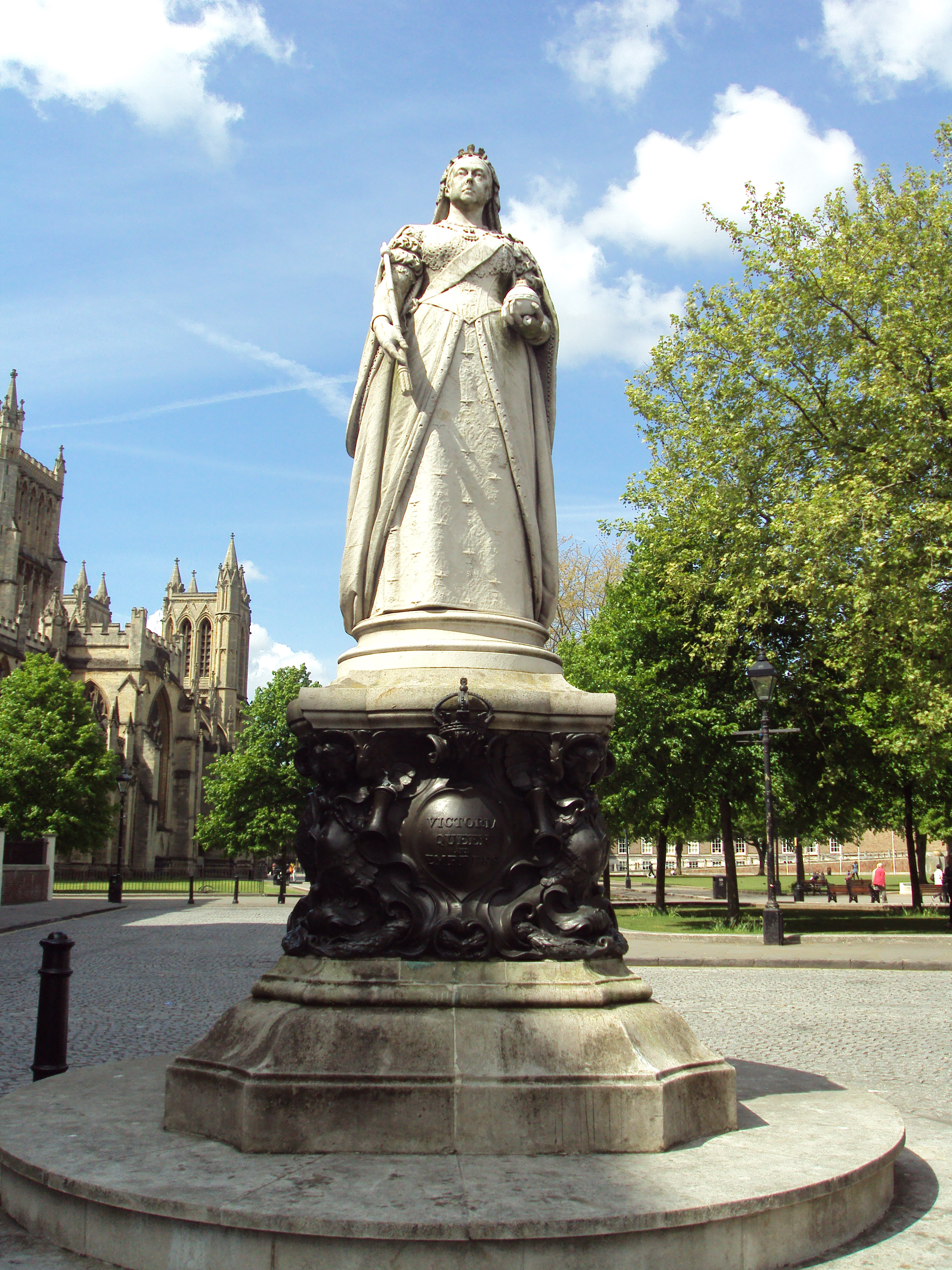
- Artist: Joseph Edgar Boehm
- Year: 1888
- Type: White marble
- Location: Bristol

The Statue of Queen Victoria by Joseph Edgar Boehm stands on College Green, Bristol, England. It is Grade II listed.

The statue was planned as part of the celebrations of the Golden Jubilee of Queen Victoria and was erected on the apex of College Green, displacing a replica of the medieval Bristol High Cross, which was moved to the centre of the Green.

The round steps of limestone ashlar lead to a square copper base with fish, putti, and inscribed panels, which support the marble statue. The figure of Queen Victoria is holding a sceptre and orb which are now broken. The statue itself is 8 feet 6 inches high and weighs four tons. It was unveiled on 25 July 1888 by Prince Albert Victor of Wales, one of Victoria's grandsons.

The statue is one of a series of very similar statues Boehm made for the Queen’s Jubilee to stand at Windsor, Balmoral Castle, Sydney, and Pietermaritzburg.

When it was put into place, a glass time capsule was incorporated into the plinth. This was uncovered during works in 2004 and given to Bristol City Museum and Art Gallery.

The statue has been moved several times.

== See also ==
- List of statues of Queen Victoria
- List of public art in Bristol
