= Eilis O'Connell =

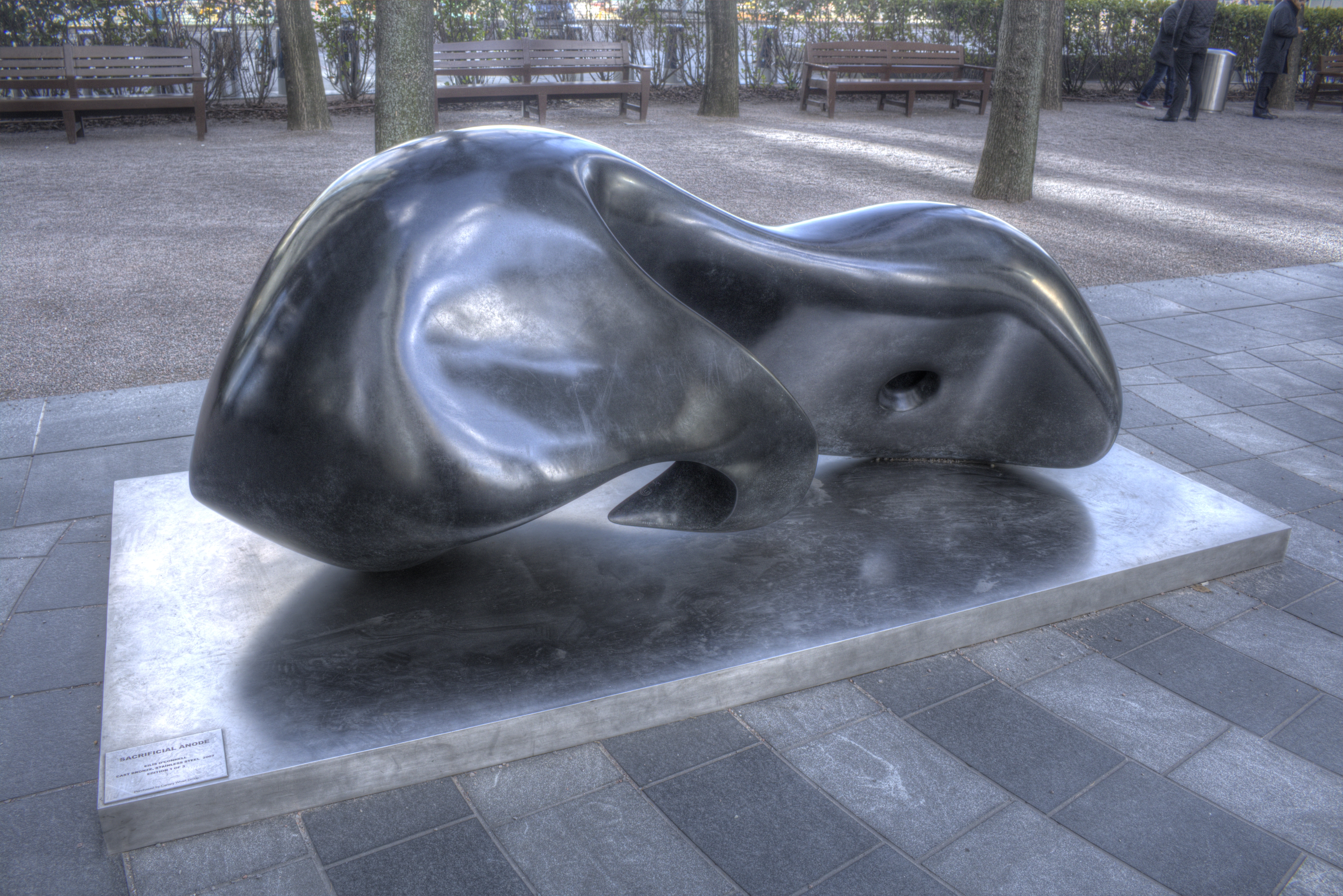
"Sacrificial Anode" in Montgomery Square, Canary Wharf, London

Eilis O'Connell (born 1953, Derry, Northern Ireland) is an abstract sculptor. She is known for her free-standing works and wall pieces.

== Early life and education ==
O'Connell was born in Derry and educated at the Crawford School of Art, Cork, Ireland and Massachusetts College of Art and Design, Boston, Massachusetts, USA.

== Career ==
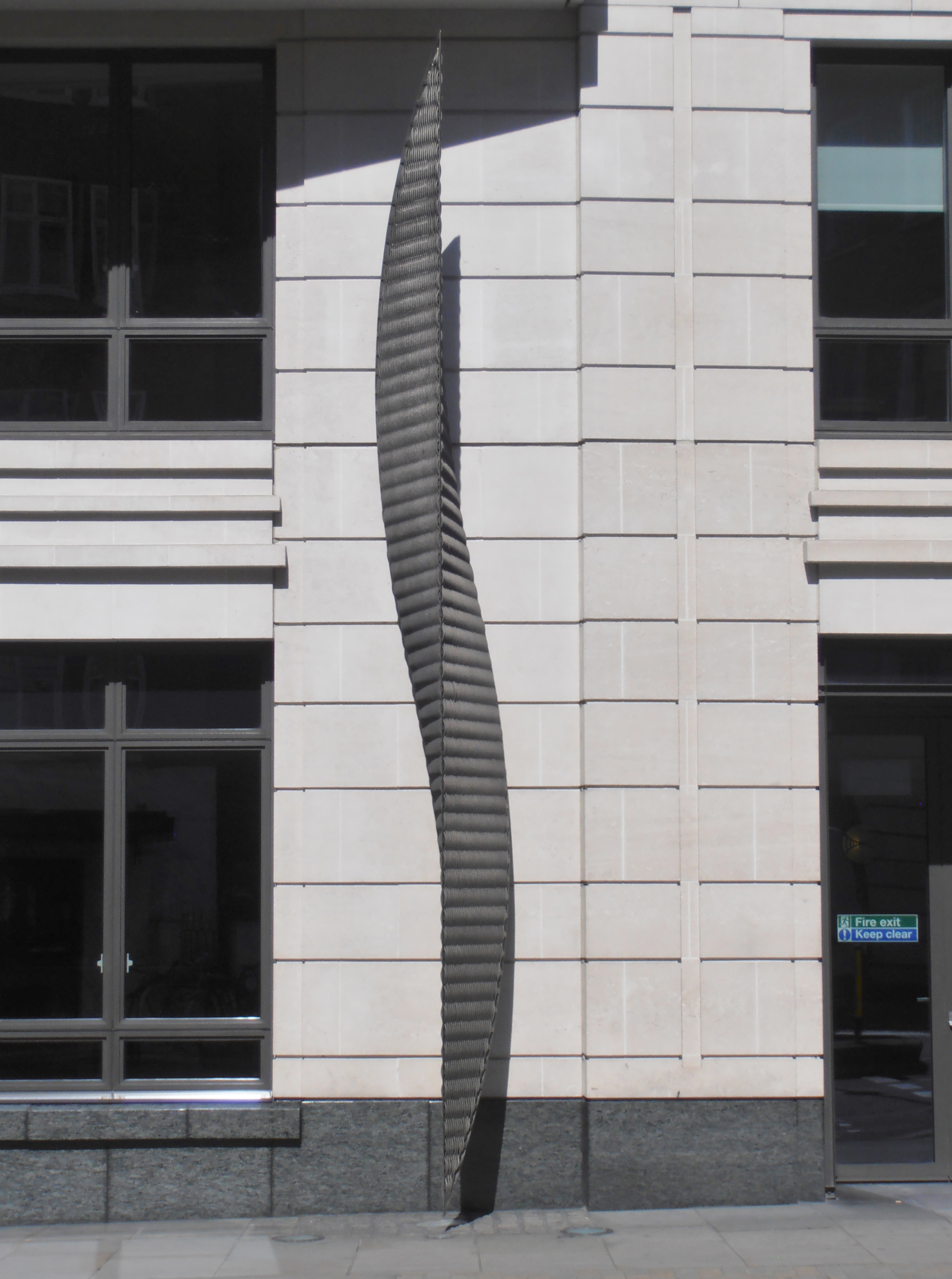
"Helix" at One Curzon Street, Mayfair, London

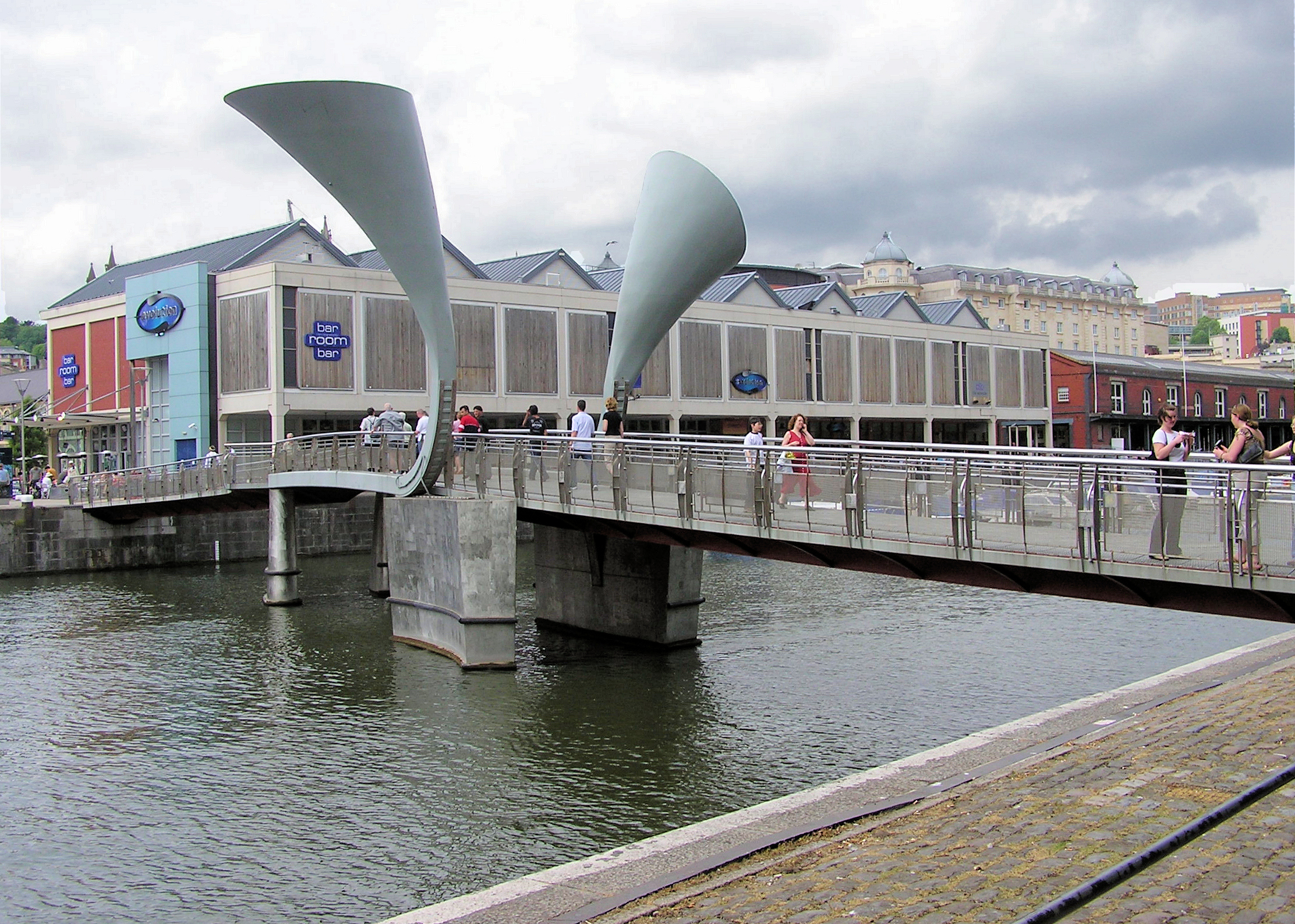
Sculpture over Pero's Bridge, Bristol

O'Connell has been commissioned to make public sculptures throughout the UK and Ireland.

She is a founder director of the National Sculpture Factory (Cork); a member of Aosdána and the Royal Hibernian Academy; and a former member of the Arts Council of Ireland.

Her honours include the Art & Work Award from Wapping Arts Trust, and Royal Society of Arts Award (1998). O'Connell's works were displayed at the Biennale de Paris (1982) and the São Paulo Art Biennial (1985). She has received fellowships from The British School at Rome and PS 1 in New York.

The artist's 1988 work "The Great Wall of Kinsale is one of the most contentious public artworks ever erected in Ireland." Composed of several sections and forms, it is also the longest sculpture in Ireland at 179 feet. The large rusted steel sculpture drew protest, concerns of safety, an attempt to deinstall it, and criticism of its appearance. Eventually, the rusty metal was painted, a water feature was added, and barriers were placed around it without O'Connell's permission. As such, she considers the work to have been "destroyed". In artist Sean Lynch's 2011 show, A Rocky Road, at the Crawford Art Gallery, he investigated the legacy of O'Connell's Great Wall of Kinsale.

She exhibited sculptures at Eileen Gray's E-1027 house in France in 2018.

O'Connell's work is in the collections of IMMA, Lismore Castle, Cass Sculpture Foundation, Chatsworth, Antony House and more.

== See also ==
- List of public art in the City of London
- List of public art in Bristol
- List of public art in Cork city

== Bibliography ==
- Finlay, Sarah (1989). The National Self-Portrait Collection of Ireland: 1979–1989. University of Limerick Press. ISBN 9780950342764.
- Ruckenstein, Lelia; O'Malley, James (20 November 2013). Everything Irish: The History, Literature, Art, Music, People, and Places of Ireland, from A to Z. Random House Publishing Group. ISBN 978-0-307-48445-1.
