= Onslow Whiting =

English sculptor

Onslow Ernest Whiting (4 June 1872 – 4 August 1937) was an English sculptor and teacher.

== Biography ==
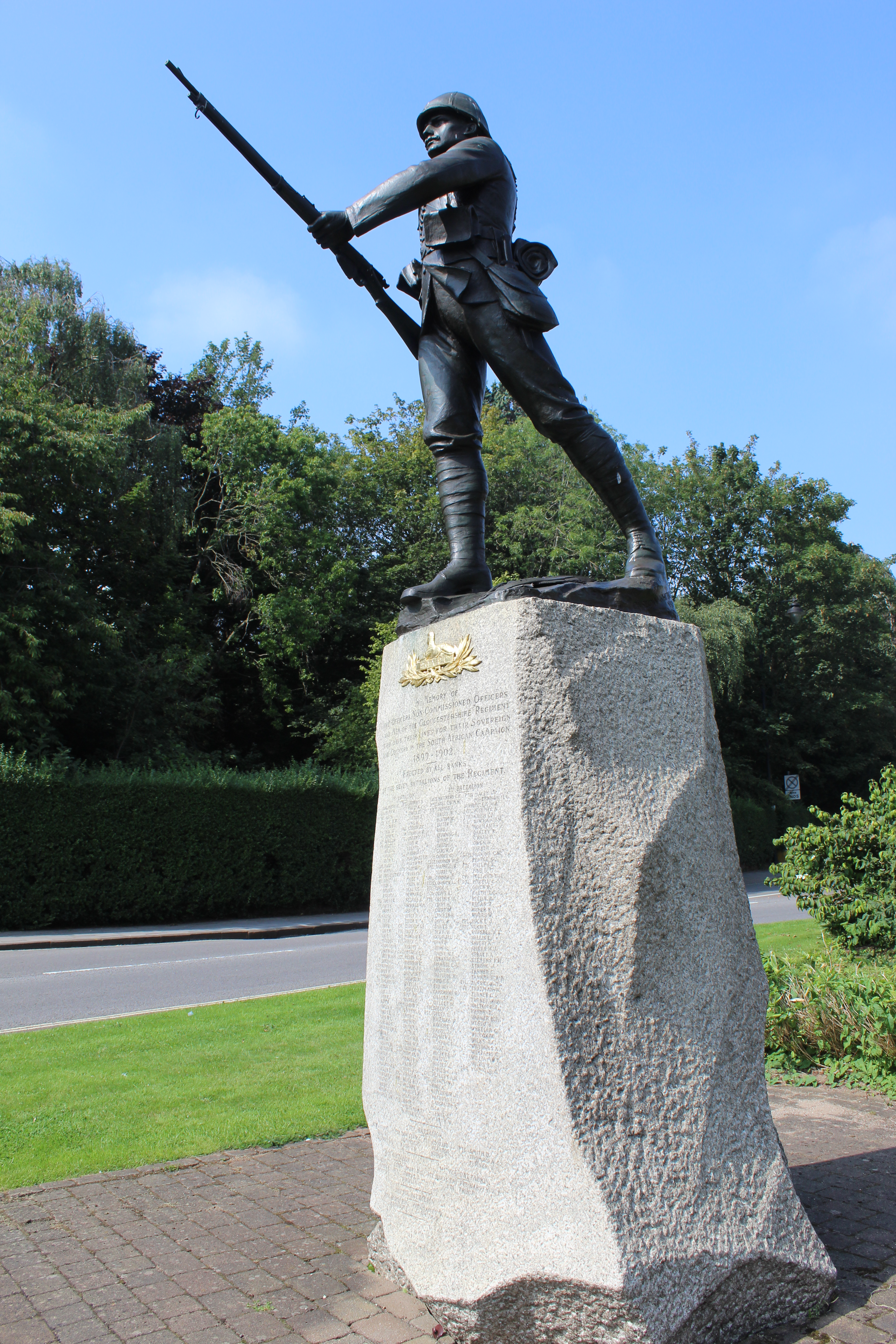
The Gloucestershire Regiment by Onslow Whiting, 1904, Bristol

Born in Shoreditch in London, from 1901 to 1927 Whiting worked as a teacher at the Central School of Arts and Crafts in London. The sculptor Cecil Thomas was among his pupils.

Whiting's best known works are war memorials. The Gloucestershire Regiment Memorial, Queen's Road, Bristol commemorates the Boer War and consists of a bronze figure of a soldier on a granite plinth. It was unveiled by Earl Roberts in 1905. The bronze was cast by the Parlanti Foundry of London.

The Letchworth Cross at Station Place, Letchworth, where Whiting went to live in 1905, commemorates the fallen of the First World War and was unveiled in 1921 by Viscount Hampden. It was listed in 2013.

Whiting also created three relief panels for the Prince Christian Victor Memorial, an obelisk commemorating the Second Boer War on Plymouth Hoe, a gift from Alfred Mosely, a philanthropist who had made his fortune in South Africa. The panel facing north shows the charge of the Devonshire Regiment at Waggon Hill and is inscribed with the words: "One point in our position was occupied by the enemy the whole day but at dusk in a very heavy rainstorm they were turned out of the position at the point of the bayonet in the most gallant manner by the Devon Regiment led by Colonel Park. General White's despatch 7 January 1900." Another panel shows the Somerset and Gloucestershire Regiments in action. The last panel carries the inscription: "This obelisk is erected by Alfred Mosely to the memory of Christian Victor Prince of Schleswig-Holstein and to the officers, non-commissioned officer and men of the Gloucestershire, Somerset and Devonshire Regiments who fell during the Boer War, 1899-1902. Onslow Whiting. November 1902."

Whiting carried out another commission for Mosely in 1906 when he created a large bronze plaque to the memory of Mosely's friend Cecil Rhodes, who died in 1902. The plaque is fixed to the facade of a terrace of houses from the 1870s which belongs to Oriel College, and marks the house where Rhodes spent the Michaelmas Term of 1881. Whiting made an effort to integrate the plaque into the architecture of the terrace and lined it up with the windows to create the effect of another window. The plaque is aedicular in shape and contains a relief portrait bust of Rhodes, with the arms of Oriel College, three lions on a shield above, and below him an inscription. The plaque was controversially granted Grade II listed status in July 2022, after the culture secretary overrode the earlier judgment by Historic England which determined that the plaque lacked the “richness of detail” required for listed status.

Whiting created many sculpture panels in metal as well as architectural metalwork. His panel St George and the Dragon was exhibited at the Royal Academy in London during 1895 and in 1899 at the sixth exhibition of the Arts and Crafts Exhibition Society. He exhibited a letter-plate entitled Mercury at the exhibition of 1910, where it was for sale for £3 3s. His door knocker Prometheus Bound was shown at the Spring Exhibition of the City Art Gallery, Leeds in 1897 and was for sale by commission in bronze for £10 10s. The sculpture panel A Dream was also shown at this exhibition.

Whiting was a member of the Royal Society of British Sculptors and the Art Workers' Guild and an Associate of the Guild of Art Craftsmen. Three of his works were published in the journal Academy Architecture and Architectural Review. Field Guns Going into Action (vol. 20 (1901) 85) is a metal relief sculpture showing a battle scene from the Boer War. His Designs for Bell-pushes, Finger-plates, etc. (vol.20 (1901) 87) make creative use of human figures in architectural hardware. A Young Minstrel (vol. 23 (1903) 97) is a three-dimensional sculpture of a boy playing a flute. These works were also exhibited at the Royal Academy, "Field Guns" in 1901 (no. 1730, the bell-pushes, finger-plates etc in 1901 (n.1774) and "A Young Minstrel" in 1903 (no.1817). In all, Onslow Whiting exhibited fifteen works at twelve Royal Academy exhibitions from 1895- 1937. From 1922 these exhibits were exclusively portraits.

Whiting died at St Catherine's Nursing Home, Letchworth, and is buried in the graveyard of the Church of St Mary, Letchworth.
