= Emma Saunders =

Philanthropist to railwaymen (1841–1927)

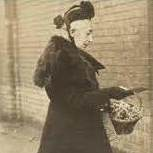
- Saunders with her basket
- Born: 2 March 1841; Middleton Stoney
- Died: 27 February 1927 (aged 85); Clifton, Bristol
- Occupations: missionary and philanthropist
- Known for: being "The Railwayman's Friend"

Emma Saunders known as The "Railwaymen's Friend" (2 March 1841 – 27 February 1927) was a British missionary (and philanthropist) to railwaymen in Bristol for fifty years.

== Life ==
Saunders was born in Middleton Stoney in Oxfordshire in 1841. She was the last of five children born to Mary Magdalene (born Morris) and Joshua Saunders. Her family moved about because of her father's work for the Bank of England. They spent two years in Manchester but they settled in Bristol where Saunders remained. Her mother offered a role model for good works. Mary M Saunders was on the committee of the "Industrial Home for Destitute Girls" and the Park Row Asylum which looked after women after they were released from prison. It was at a mission organised at the Christ Church, Clifton Down that she identified her own mission. She went into teaching, working at a ragged school and at a Sunday School.

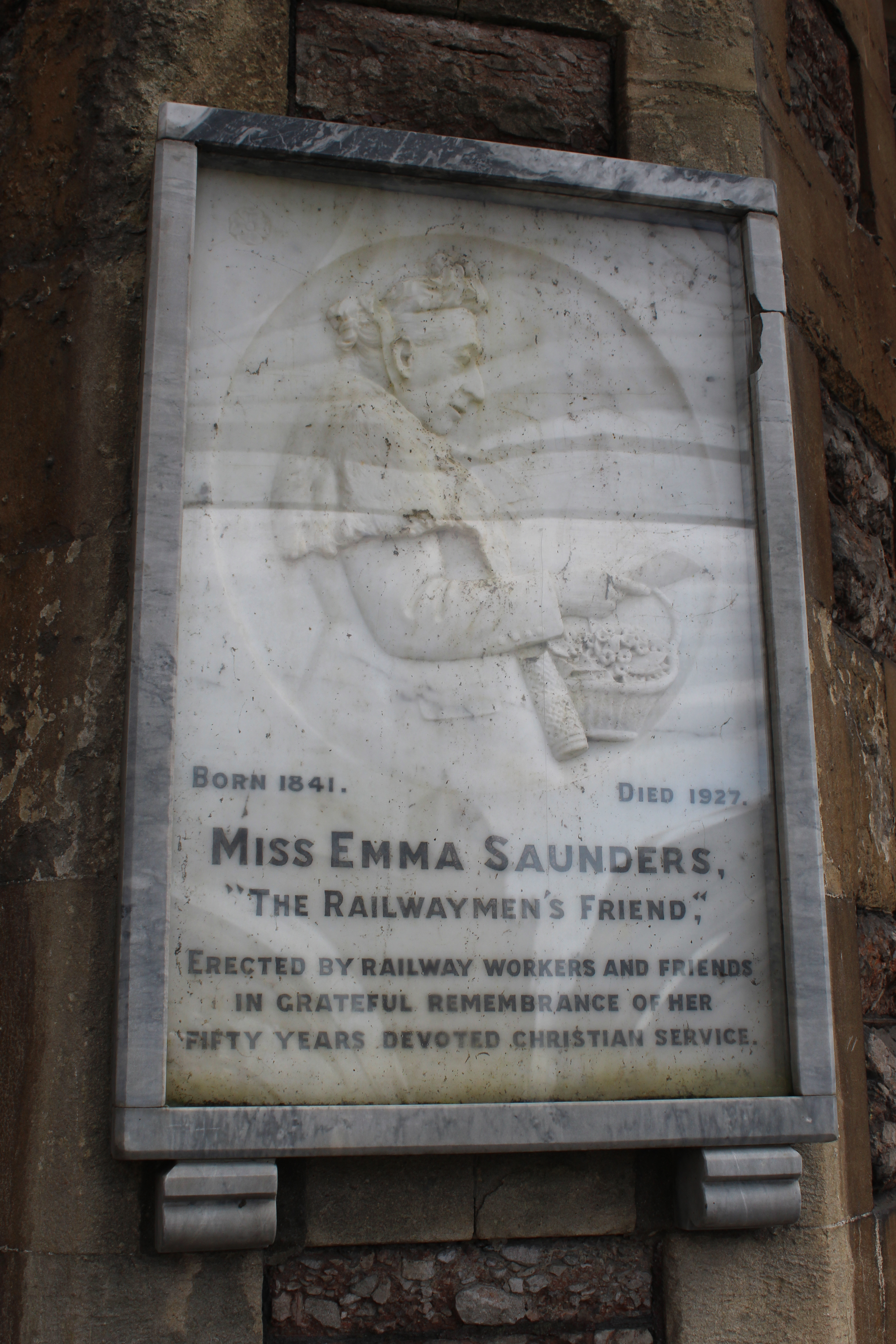
the plaque at Bristol Temple Meads Station

In 1878 Saunders had organised a bible class at Bristol Temple Meads railway station which was available each Sunday and on the Monday she held a similar meeting for mothers. This activity led to her visiting the places where the men were working at the time. Many worked on the Severn Tunnel which was thirteen years in construction until 1876. In 1881 the Railway Mission was founded which Saunders joined but her work predated the mission's formation. The Great Western Railway Temperance Society had assisted her in creating a "temperance hall" at Pyle Hill goods yard in the 1880s.

She is credited with founding the "Bristol and West of England Railwaymen's Institute" whose rooms included a canteen and classrooms. The classrooms could be used for religious meetings or to teach engineering. She was helped in her work by Miss Hickman who also served with the Bristol and Clifton Dorcas Society.

She was also known as the "Lady with the Basket" as she would visit any railway premise where she was invited or when someone was ill and she would give out a tract or a small present to those she met from her basket. She was said to visit 2,000 people every month. The visits continued until after the end of the first world war in 1919. Saunders died in the Clifton area of Bristol in 1927. On 1 July 1928 a plaque was unveiled at the entrance to Bristol Temple Meads station to celebrate her fifty years of "devoted Christian service" and showed her with her basket.
