= International Festival of the Sea, 1996 =

Coordinates: 51°27′N 2°36′W

The International Festival of the Sea was a maritime festival, held in and around the Floating Harbour in the English port city of Bristol. Held from 24 to 27 May 1996, it was the first of a series of International Festivals of the Sea that have since been held in various United Kingdom ports.

The key theme of the Bristol festival was John Cabot's pioneering voyage of discovery to the Americas. As part of the festival, a replica of Cabot's ship, the Matthew, was dedicated prior to its reenactment of Cabot's voyage the following year. Other vessels taking part included the tall ships Eye of the Wind, Pride of Baltimore, Rose, Kaskelot and Earl of Pembroke. The sail training ship Royalist made the news by going aground in the tricky passage of the Avon Gorge on the approaches to the Floating Harbour; no casualties or damage was sustained and the ship was subsequently refloated.

Unlike the annual Bristol Harbour Festival, the International Festival of the Sea was a ticketed event. This necessitated cordoning off the, usually publicly accessible, harbourside areas, together with nearby parts of the city centre. Within this cordon visitors were able to view the visiting ships and boats, and watch live music, street performances and other entertainments. The festival was brought to a close by a firework display.

The festival was extensively covered by BBC Television, with several live programs broadcast from the event. The coverage was presented by Peter Snow, Jill Dando and Sandi Toksvig, with additional material by Tony Robinson and Antony Worrall Thompson.

The festival failed to acknowledge Bristol's involvement in the slave trading industry.
