= Canon's Marsh =

Inner city area of Bristol, England

Coordinates: 51.45°N 2.60°W

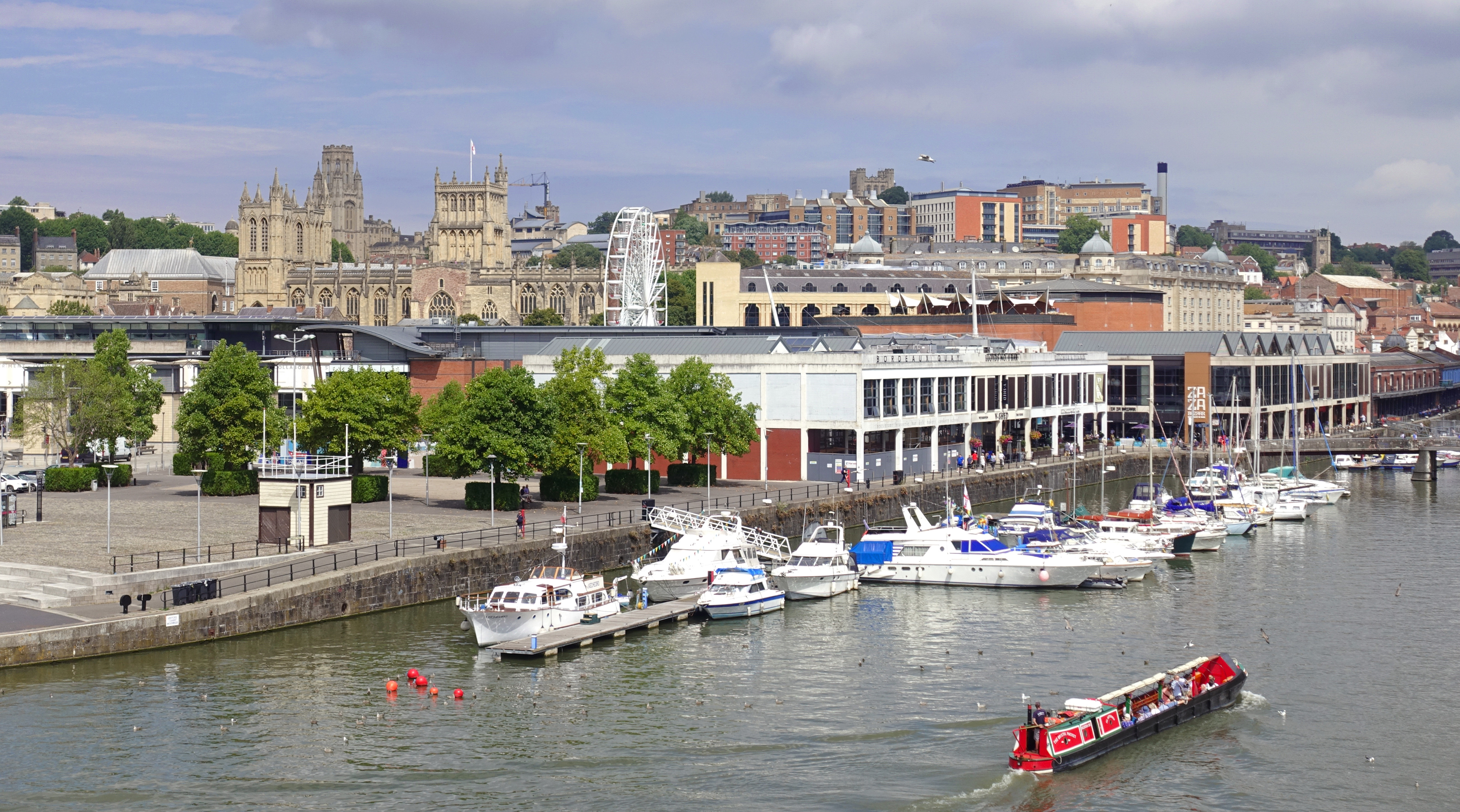
- Canon's Marsh – the low land in the foreground – with Bristol Cathedral and St Michael's Hill behind.

- Location within Bristol
- OS grid reference: ST583724
- Unitary authority: Bristol
- Ceremonial county: Bristol
- Region: South West
- Country: England
- Sovereign state: United Kingdom
- Post town: BRISTOL
- Postcode district: BS6
- Dialling code: 0117
- Police: Avon and Somerset
- Fire: Avon
- Ambulance: South Western
- UK Parliament: Bristol Central

Canon's Marsh (sometimes written Canons Marsh) is an inner city area of Bristol, England. Canon's Marsh occupies low-lying land on the north side of the Floating Harbour, immediately to the west of the River Frome spur (St Augustine's Reach) of the harbour. Canon's Marsh includes Bordeaux Quay, Canon's Wharf, Hannover Quay, and Millennium Square, and is part of the area that has been branded "Harbourside".

Formerly an industrial area, with busy quaysides, warehouses, railway transit sheds and one of the city's main gas works, Canon's Marsh was subject to urban regeneration beginning in the 1980s and completing in the 2010s. It is now a mixed use neighbourhood with residential and office developments alongside major leisure attractions.

Canons' Marsh borders Hotwells to the west, Clifton to the north, and the city centre to the north east. It is in the Hotwells and Harbourside electoral ward.

== History ==
It was a shipbuilding area until the last yard closed in 1904, incorporating two of Teast's Docks, and including J&W Peters shipyard.

Canon's Wharf was developed in the 1890s with open quaysides suited to the larger ships and increasing mechanisation of cargo transit of the age, becoming one of the busiest parts of the docks in the early 20th century. In 1891 it had a quayside steam crane, mounted on a stone tower that survives at Lloyds amphitheatre, and it later gained rail-mounted electric cranes. It had its own branch of the Bristol Harbour Railway and in 1906 the Great Western Railway built a large goods shed beside the railyard, pioneering the use of François Hennebique's reinforced concrete system.

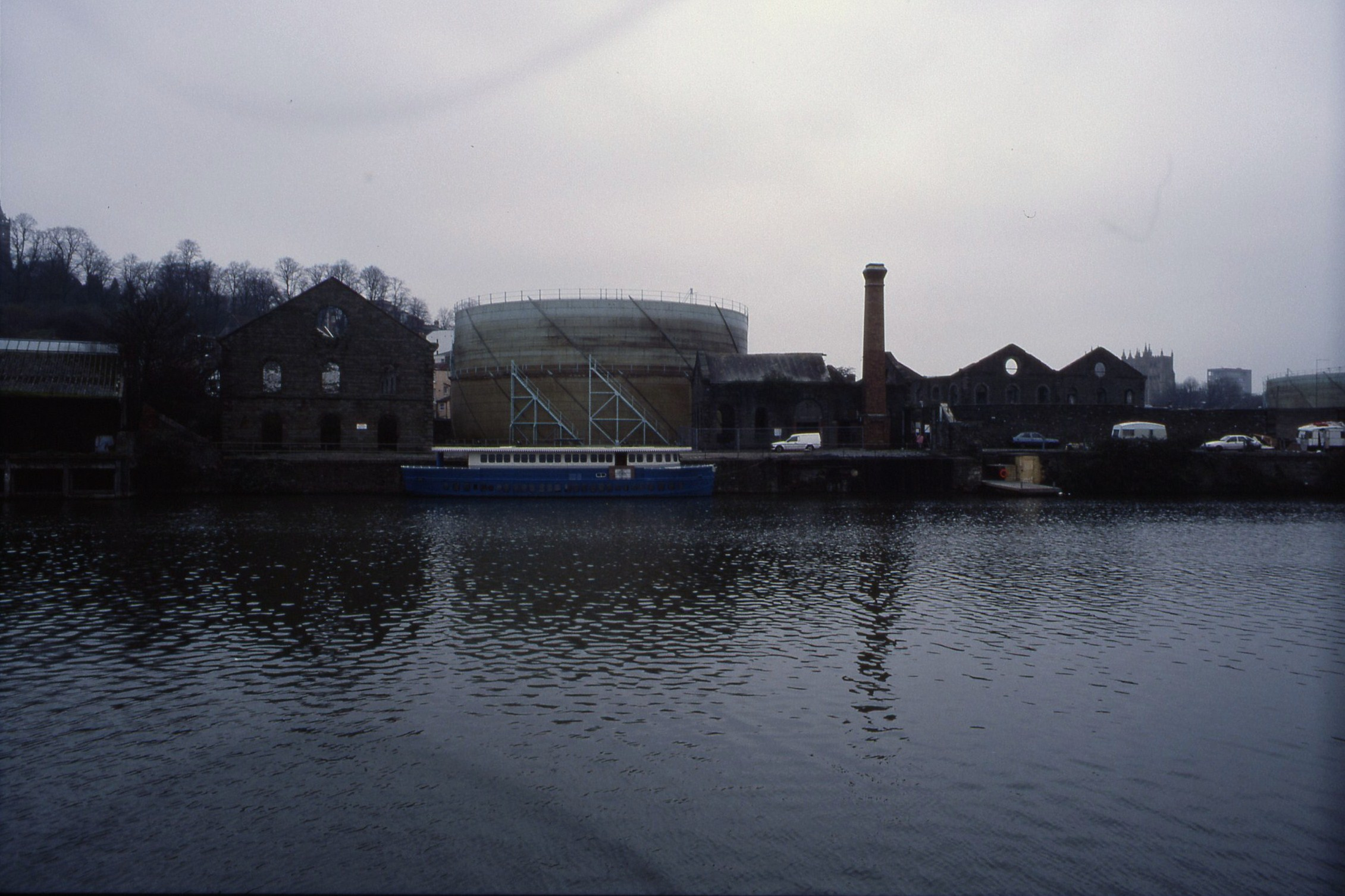
The derelict gasworks in 1994.

Bristol and Clifton Gas Company opened Canon's Marsh Gasworks at the western end of the site in the early 1820s, producing town gas. The gasworks constructed two large gas holders, in 1863 and 1933, which were prominent landmarks until their demolition in the 1990s.

In 1920, Imperial Tobacco built large 7-storey bond warehouses at Canon's Marsh, which were dominant on the skyline until they were demolished in 1988.

=== Regeneration ===
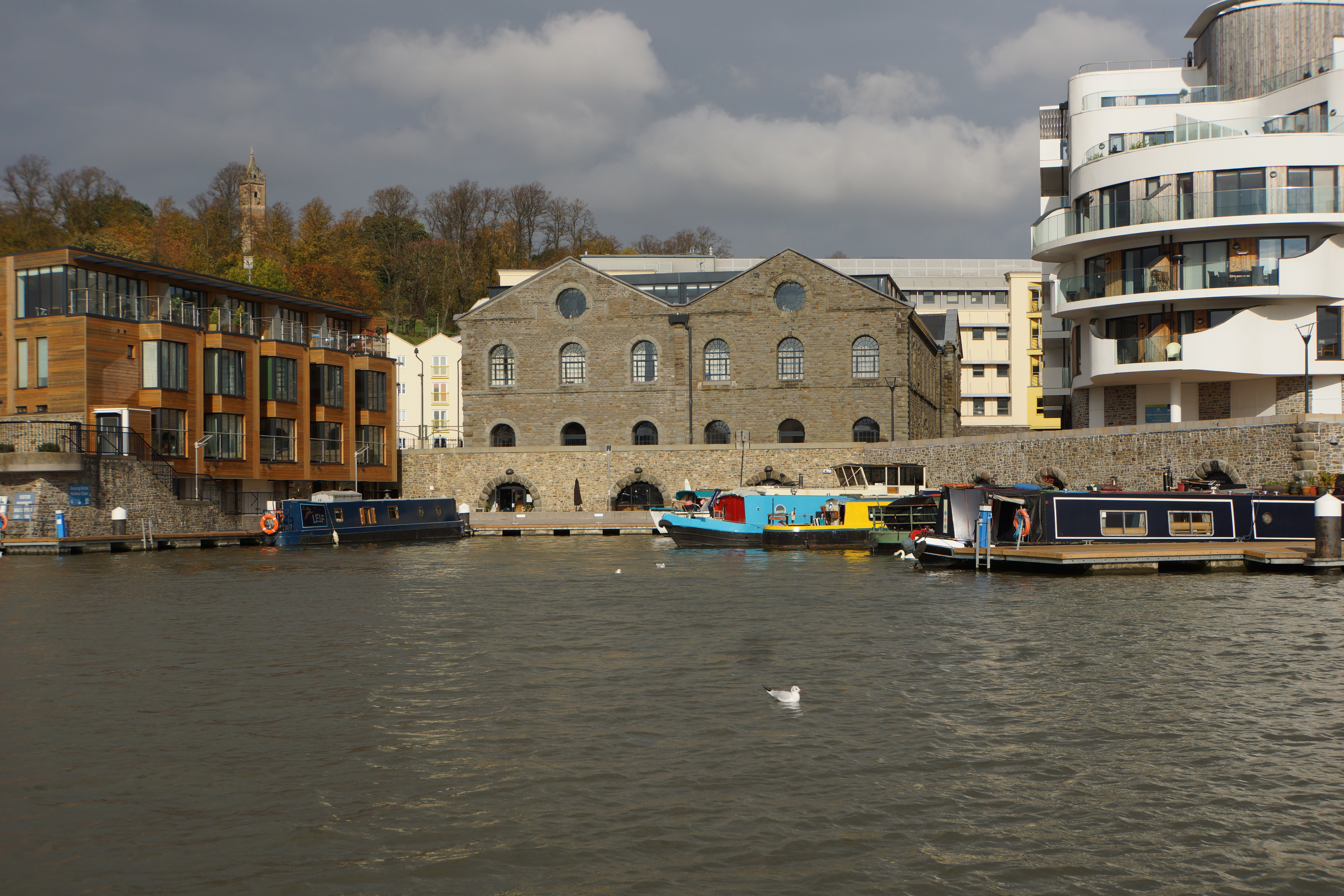
The gasworks site after regeneration.

With the expansion of the downstream Avonmouth Docks – more modern and accessible to shipping – throughout the 20th century, industrial use of Bristol's city centre docks declined, and they effectively closed in 1975. In 1969, Bristol City Council had proposed closing the harbour entirely, and began developing plans to build a system of major roads through harbourside areas including Canon's Marsh. A backlash against these plans, and increasing recognition of the potential leisure value of the water and waterfront led to the abandonment of the road plans in 1976.

Regeneration of Canon's Marsh began slowly, with the opening of Watershed in 1982 in disused transit sheds. In the 1970s, the former rail yard was converted into a temporary car park, which later closed in phases as regeneration slowly spread from east to west through the 1980s and 1990s. The first major phase of regeneration began in the late 1980s, with the tobacco warehouses cleared to make way for Canons House, a landmark office building constructed 1988-91 for Lloyds Bank. This included the first phase of opening up the quaysides as public space, with the construction of an amphitheatre shaped plaza.

Regeneration accelerated in the late 1990s, with more formal masterplanning from Bristol City Council leading to investment in the public realm, aided by National Lottery funding distributed by the Millennium Commission, which contributed to 1999's Pero's Bridge, the hands-on science museum We the Curious (then named @Bristol), and Millennium Square. In 1997, the now public quaysides of Canon's Wharf were named Bordeaux Quay (in the east) and Hannover Quay (in the south), to celebrate 50 years of Bristol's twin town relationships with Bordeaux and Hannover.

With public infrastructure in place, further waves of private investment followed, first of leisure and hospitality destinations on the quays on the eastern side of Canon's Marsh, and then of office and apartment buildings in the centre.

Due to the need for pollution mitigation, the gasworks at the western end of the site was the last phase of Canon's Marsh to be redeveloped, which, after the 2008 financial crisis was not completed until 2019. Three grade II listed buildings from the gasworks, East and West Purifier Houses and Engine House, were preserved and converted alongside the construction of new apartment buildings.
