= Bristol Marina =

Mooring place for small boats in Bristol, England

Coordinates: 51°27′00″N 2°36′28″W

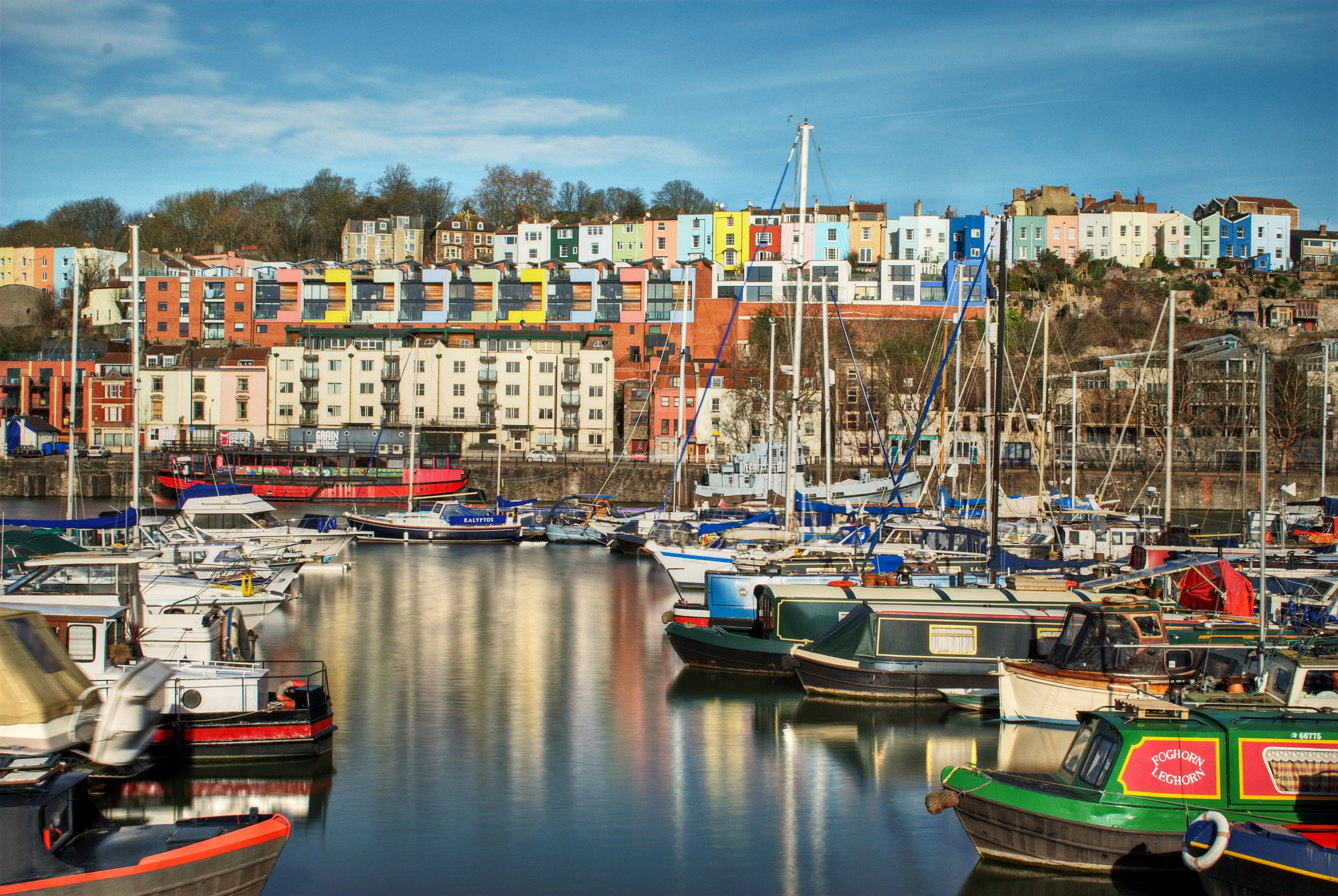
Bristol Marina

Bristol Marina, Bristol

The Bristol Marina is located in Bristol Harbour, Bristol, England. The marina has been in operation since 1980. It is situated adjacent to the SS Great Britain on the south side of the harbour on the site of the former Charles Hill & Sons Ltd's Albion Dockyard, which it shares with Abels Shipbuilders.

Facilities include 100 pontoon berths, 70 shore berths, a 30 tonne lift, showers, water, electric points, telephone points, fuel berth, chandlers and a sail-maker.
