= Bristol Harbour =

Harbour in Bristol, England

Coordinates: 51°27′N 2°36′W

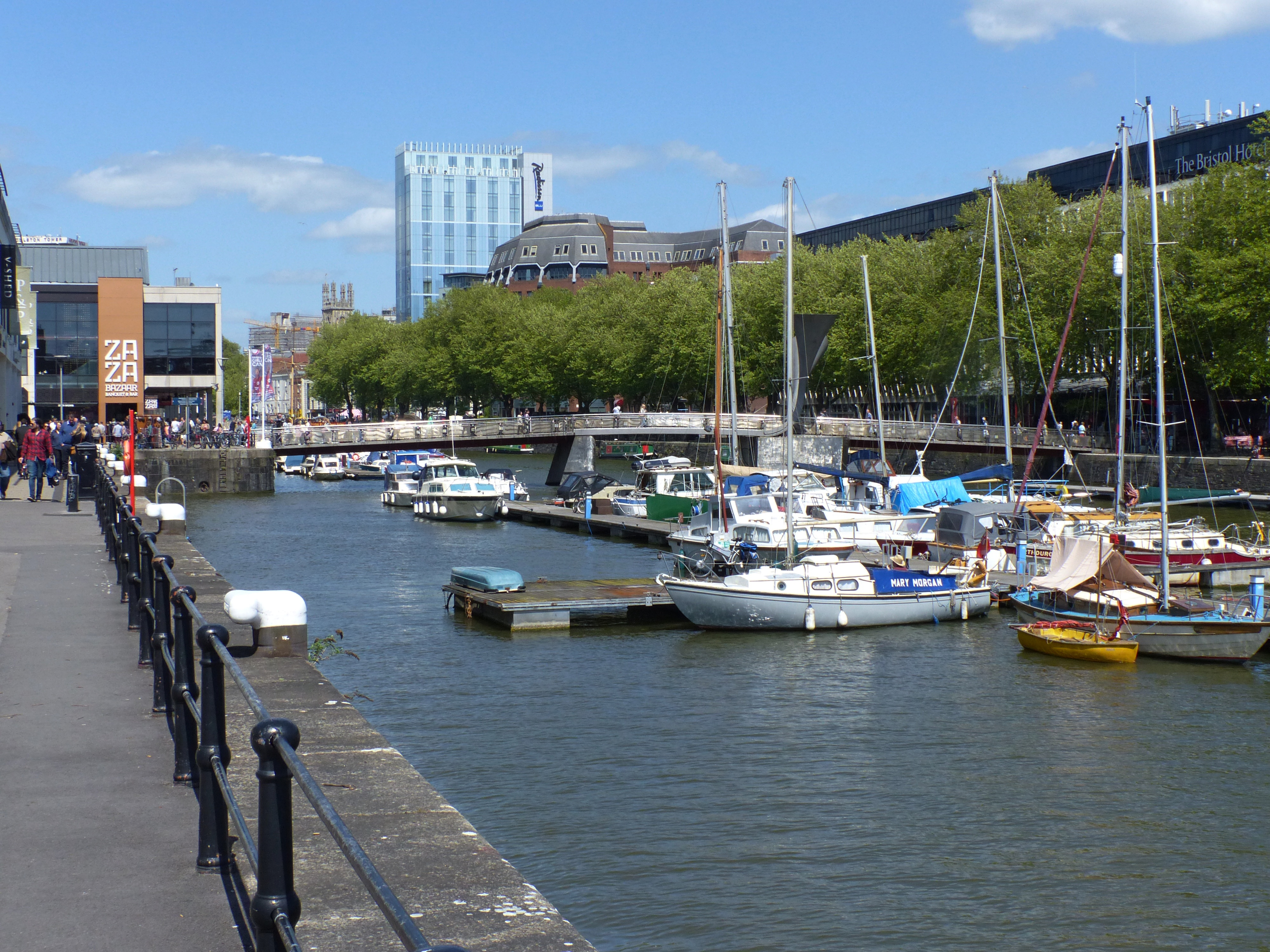
Bristol Harbour, looking toward the city centre

Bristol Harbour is the harbour in the city of Bristol, England. The harbour covers an area of 70 acres (28 hectares). It is the former natural tidal river Avon through the city but was made into its current form in 1809 when the tide was prevented from going out permanently. A tidal by-pass was dug for 2 miles through the fields of Bedminster for the river, known as the "River Avon New Cut", "New Cut", or simply "The Cut". It is often called the Floating Harbour as the water level remains constant and it is not affected by the state of the tide on the river in the Avon Gorge, The New Cut or the natural river southeast of Temple Meads to its source.

Netham Lock at the east end of the 1809 Feeder Canal is the upstream limit of the floating harbour. Beyond the lock is a junction: on one arm the navigable River Avon continues upstream to Bath, and on the other arm is the tidal natural River Avon. The first 1 mile (1.6 kilometres) of the floating harbour, downstream from Netham Lock to Totterdown Basin, is an artificial canal known as the Feeder Canal, while the tidal River Avon follows its original route. Downstream of Totterdown Basin, the floating harbour occupies the former natural course of the River Avon, whilst the tidal River Avon flows through an artificial channel known as the New Cut. This separation of the floating harbour and the tidal River Avon allows boats in the harbour to remain floating at low tide, reduces currents and silting and prevents flooding.

Between Bristol Temple Meads railway station and Hotwells, the harbour and the River Avon run parallel at a distance of no more than 5/8 mile (1 kilometre) apart. Downstream of Bristol Temple Meads railway station, the floating harbour meanders through Bristol city centre, Canon's Marsh and Hotwells. At Hotwells, the floating harbour rejoins the tidal River Avon, via a series of locks, and flows into the Avon Gorge.

Bristol Harbour was the original Port of Bristol, but as ships and their cargo have increased in size, it has now largely been replaced by docks at Avonmouth and Portbury. These are located 7 mi (11 km) downstream at the mouth of the River Avon.

== Sections, quays and harbourside features ==
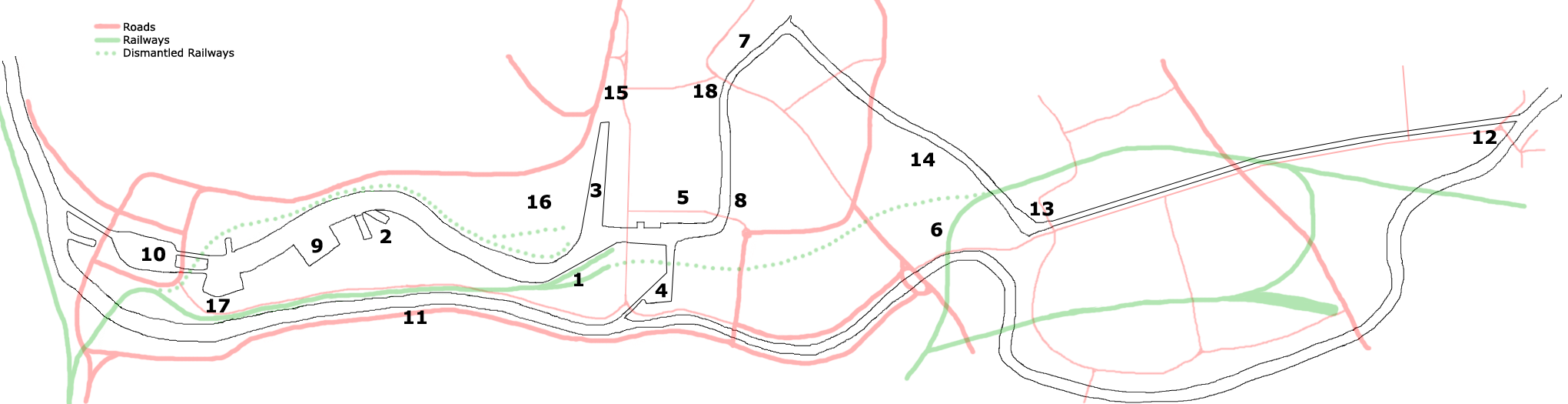

1. Prince's Wharf, including M Shed, Pyronaut and Mayflower adjoining Prince Street Bridge
2. Dry docks: SS Great Britain, the Matthew
3. St Augustine's Reach, Pero's Bridge
4. Bathurst Basin
5. Queen Square
6. Bristol Temple Meads railway station
7. Castle Park
8. Redcliffe Quay and Redcliffe Caves
9. Baltic Wharf marina
10. Cumberland Basin & Brunel Locks
11. The New Cut
12. Netham Lock, entrance to the Feeder Canal
13. Totterdown Basin
14. Temple Quay
15. The Centre
16. Canon's Marsh, including Millennium Square and We The Curious
17. Underfall Yard
18. Bristol Bridge and Welsh Back

== History of Bristol docks ==
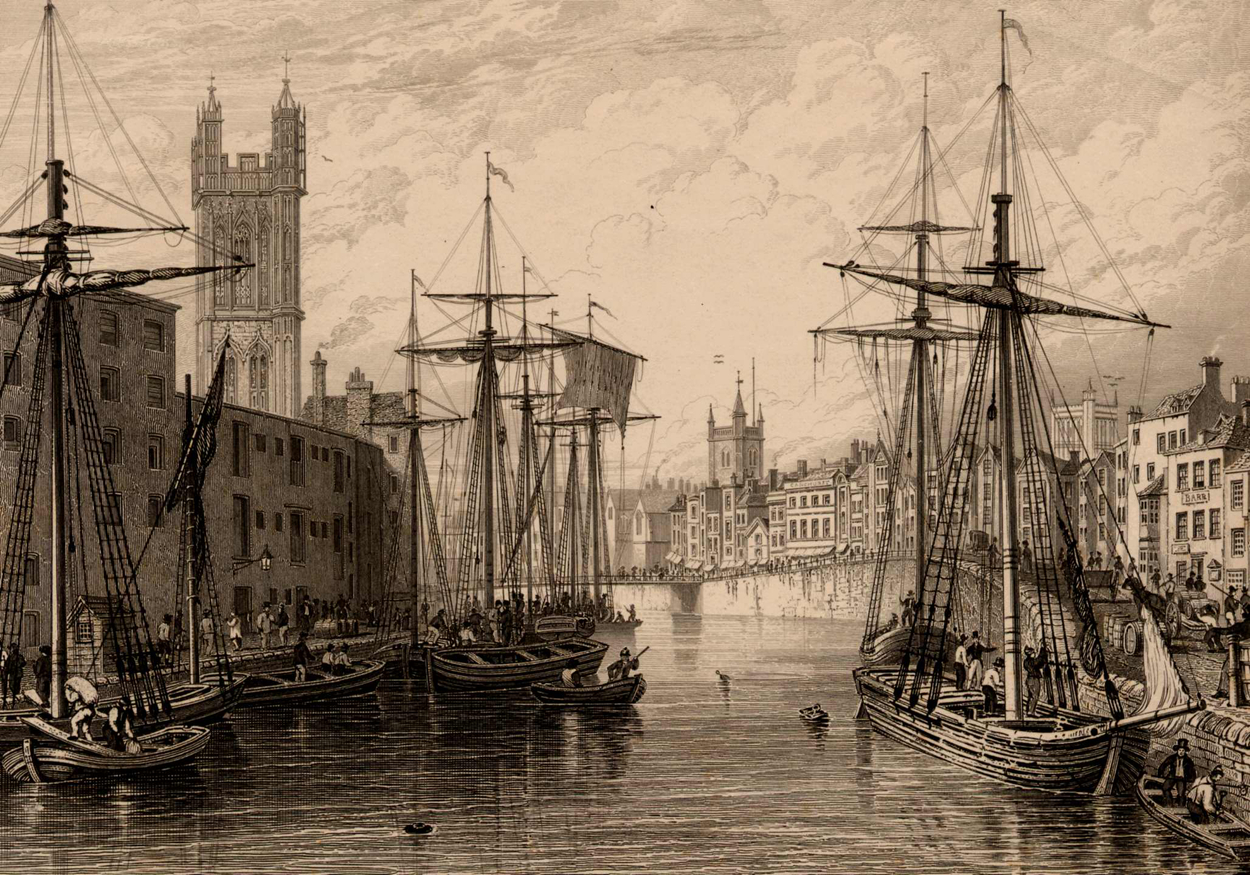
Black and white etching showing the towers of St Stephen's Church, St Augustine the Less Church and Bristol Cathedral, published c. 1850. The view shows the historic harbour with ten sailing ships and rowing boats before the channel was filled in 1892–1938.

Bristol grew up on the banks of the Rivers Avon and Frome. Since the 13th century, the rivers have been modified for use as docks including the diversion of the River Frome in the 1240s into an artificial deep channel known as "Saint Augustine's Reach", which flowed into the River Avon. Saint Augustine's Reach became the heart of Bristol's docks with its quays and wharfs. The River Avon within the gorge, and the River Severn into which it flows, has tides which fluctuate about 47 feet (14 metres) between high and low water. This means that the river is easily navigable at high tide but reduced to a muddy channel at low tide in which ships would often run aground. Ships had no option but to be stranded in the harbour for unloading, giving rise to the phrase "shipshape and Bristol fashion" to describe how ships and their secured cargo were capable of taking the strain of repeated strandings on the mud.

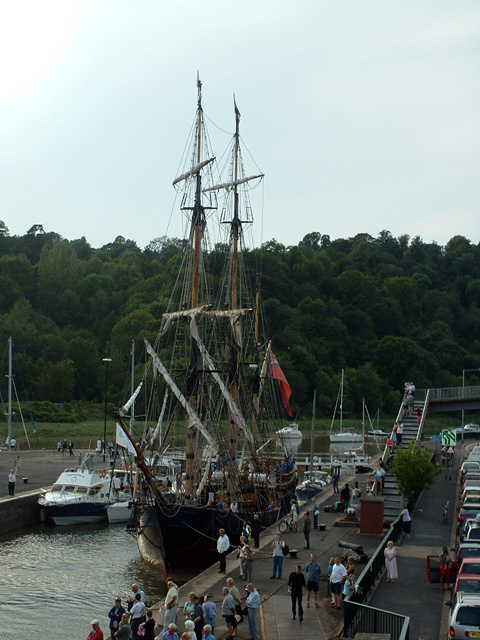
A tall ship in the Cumberland lock, Hotwells, during the 2004 Harbour Festival

As early as 1420, vessels from Bristol were regularly travelling to Iceland and it is speculated that sailors from Bristol had made landfall in the Americas before Christopher Columbus or John Cabot. After Cabot arrived in Bristol, he proposed a scheme to the king, Henry VII, in which he proposed to reach Asia by sailing west across the north Atlantic. He estimated that this would be shorter and quicker than Columbus' southerly route. The merchants of Bristol, operating under the name of the Society of Merchant Venturers, agreed to support his scheme. They had sponsored probes into the north Atlantic from the early 1480s, looking for possible trading opportunities. In 1552 Edward VI granted a royal charter to the Merchant Venturers to manage the port.

By 1670, the city had 6,000 tons of shipping, of which half was used for importing tobacco. By the late 17th century and early 18th century, this shipping was also playing a significant role in the slave trade.

=== Construction of the floating harbour ===
Bristol Harbour Act 1803
- Act of Parliament
- Parliament of the United Kingdom
- Long title: An Act for improving and rendering more commodious the Port and Harbour of Bristol.
- Citation: 43 Geo. 3. c. cxl

Dates
- Royal assent: 11 August 1803

Other legislation
- Repealed by: Bristol Dock Company Act 1848

Status: Repealed

Text of statute as originally enacted

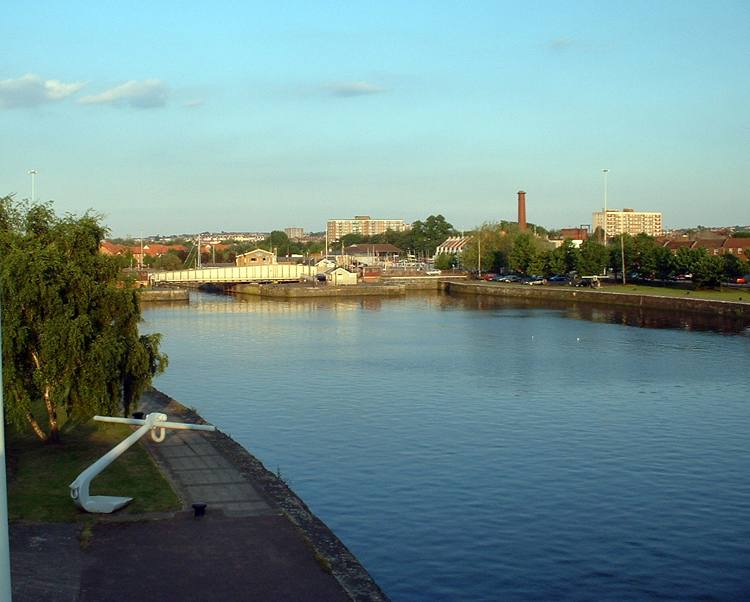
The Cumberland Basin

In the 18th century, the docks in Liverpool grew larger and so increased competition with Bristol for the tobacco trade. Coastal trade was also important, with the area called "Welsh Back" concentrating on trows with cargoes from the slate industry in Wales, stone, timber and coal. The limitations of Bristol's docks were causing problems to business, so in 1802 William Jessop proposed installing a dam and lock at Hotwells to create the harbour. The £530,000 scheme was approved by Parliament in the Bristol Harbour Act 1803 (43 Geo. 3. c. cxl) which incorporated the Bristol Dock Company, and construction began in May 1804. The scheme included the construction of the Cumberland Basin, a large wide stretch of the harbour in Hotwells where the Quay walls and bollards have listed building status.

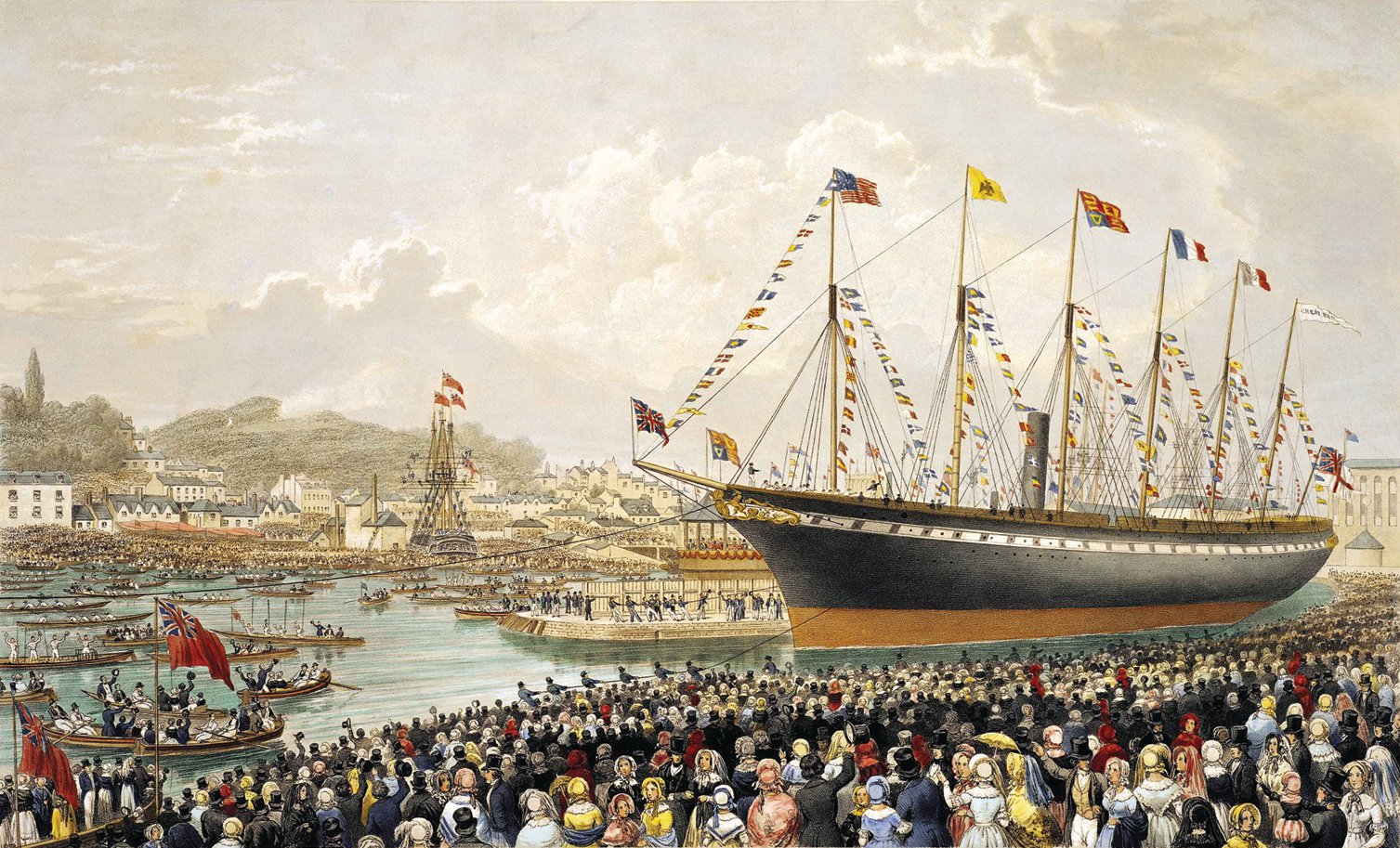
Launch of the SS Great Britain, the revolutionary ship of Isambard Kingdom Brunel, at Bristol in 1843

The tidal new cut was constructed from Netham to Hotwells, with another dam installed at this end of the harbour. The Feeder Canal between Temple Meads and Netham provided a link to the tidal river so that boats could continue upstream to Bath. However, the new scheme required a way to equalise the levels inside and outside the Dock for the passage of vessels to and from the Avon, and bridges to cross the water. Jessop built Cumberland Basin with two entrance locks from the tidal Avon, of widths 45 and 35 ft (13.7 and 10.7 m), and a 45-foot-wide (13.7 m) junction lock between the Basin and what became known as the Floating Harbour. This arrangement provided flexibility of operation with the Basin being used as a lock when there were large numbers of arrivals and sailings. The harbour was officially opened on 1 May 1809. The first vessel built in the Floating Harbour was Dochfour.

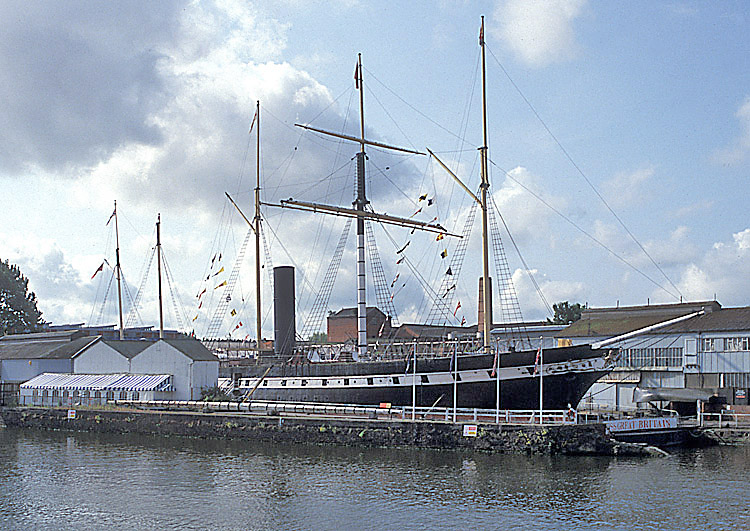
SS Great Britain

Patterson's yard within the harbour was used for the construction of many ships notably Brunel's SS Great Western in 1838 and the SS Great Britain in 1843. They were some of the largest ships to have been built at the time, and ironically hastened the decline of the city docks by proving the feasibility of large ships. The SS Great Britain was to be towed away from her builders, to have her 1,000 hp engines and interior fitted out on the River Thames, but her 48 ft (14.6 m) beam was too big to pass through the lock. Thus the SS Great Britain was moored in the Floating Harbour until December 1844, before proceeding into Cumberland Basin after coping stones and lock gate platforms were removed from the Junction Lock. At one time there were dozens of Bristol shipyards, the largest in the harbour being Hilhouse, who became Charles Hill & Sons in 1845.

=== 19th century improvements ===
Bristol Dock Company Act 1848
- Act of Parliament
- Parliament of the United Kingdom
- Long title: An Act for facilitating the Transfer of the Bristol Docks to the Mayor, Aldermen, and Burgesses of the City of Bristol, and for other Purposes.
- Citation: 11 & 12 Vict. c. xliii

Dates
- Royal assent: 30 June 1848

Text of statute as originally enacted

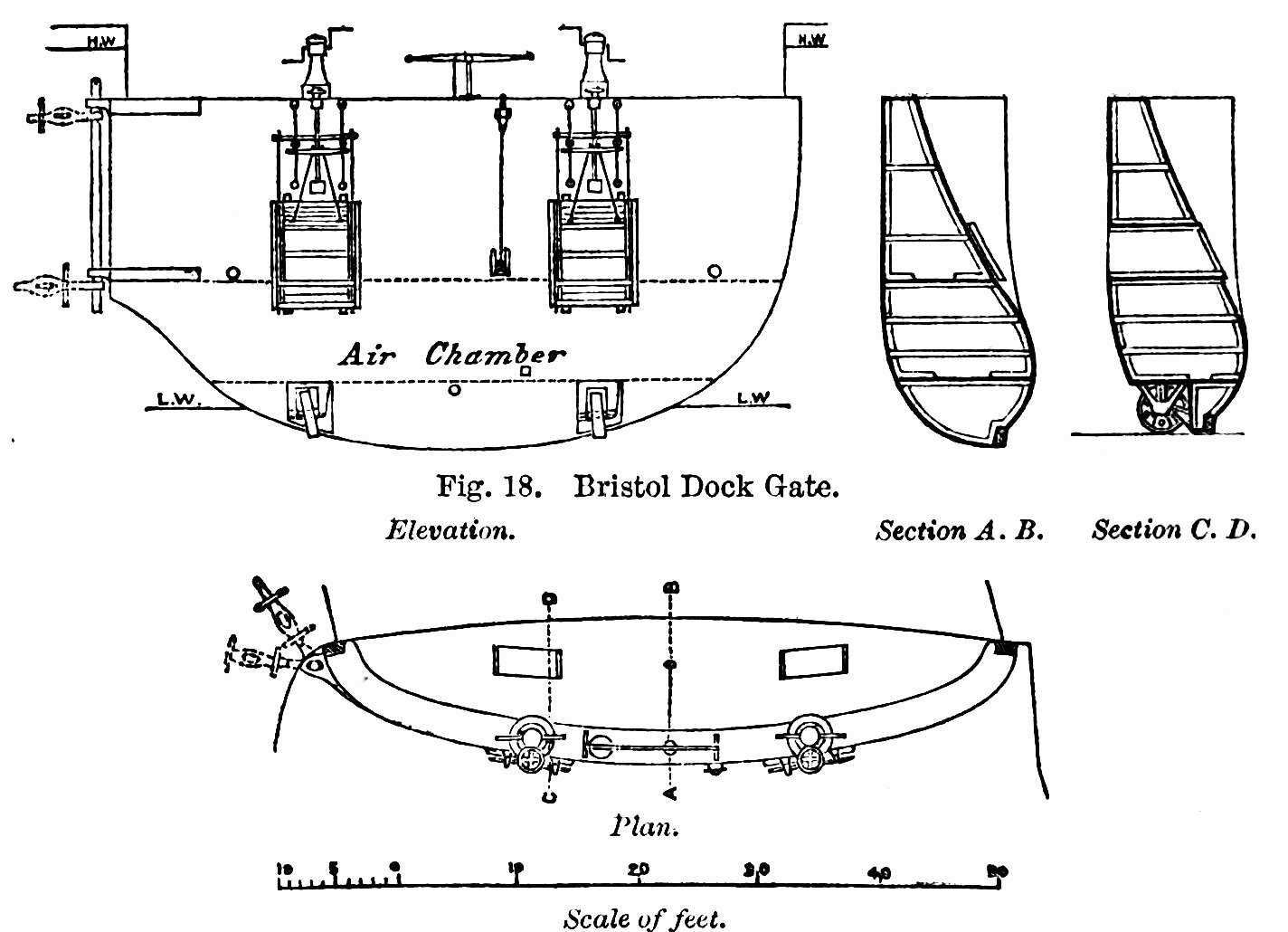
Bristol Dock gates designed by Brunel

The harbour cost more than anticipated and high rates were levied to repay loans, reducing any benefit the new harbour had at drawing companies back from Liverpool. In 1848 the city council bought the Bristol Dock Company to force down the rates; this was authorised by the Bristol Dock Company Act 1848 (11 & 12 Vict. c. xliii). They employed Isambard Kingdom Brunel to make improvements, including new lock gates, a dredger and sluice gates designed to reduce siltation.

By the middle of the 19th century there was a regular steam packet passenger service to Cork, Waterford, Dublin, Tenby, Carmarthen, Haverford West, Milford Haven, Swansea, Cardiff and Newport operated by the Bristol General Steam Navigation Company from Broad Quay in St Augustine's Reach.

By 1867, ships were getting larger and the meanders in the river Avon prevented vessels over 300 ft (91 m) from reaching the harbour. A scheme to install a much larger lock at Avonmouth to make the entire river a floating harbour, and to straighten the sharper bends, was dropped after work began on the much cheaper docks at Avonmouth and Portishead. The present entrance lock was designed by Thomas Howard and opened in July 1873. This has a width of 62 ft (18.9 m) and is the only entrance lock now in use at the City Docks.

From 1893 until 1934 the Clifton Rocks Railway provided a funicular railway link, inside the cliff face, from the western end of the harbour, which is close to the locks, into Clifton.

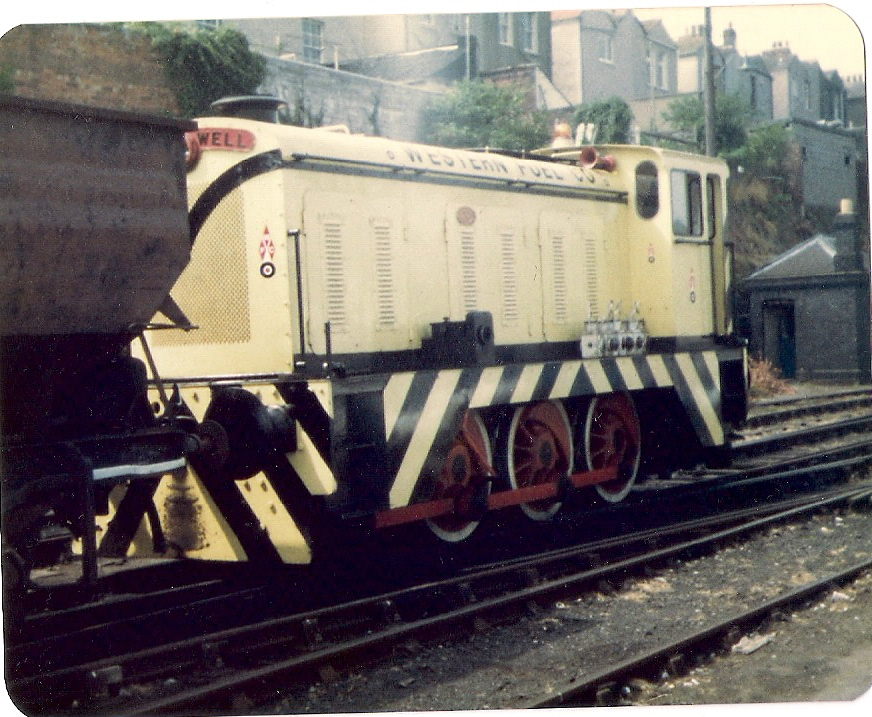
Western Fuels diesel locomotive shunting coal trucks at the Coal Concentration Depot in 1981

==== Railways ====
The original Bristol Harbour Railway was a joint venture by the GWR and the Bristol and Exeter Railway, opened in 1872 between Temple Meads and the Floating Harbour. Its route included a tunnel under St Mary Redcliffe church and a steam-powered bascule bridge over the entrance locks at Bathurst Basin. In 1876 the railway was extended by 1/2 mi (800 m) to Wapping Wharf. In 1906, new branches from the south via the Ashton Avenue swing bridge were built to Canons Marsh on the north side of the Floating Harbour and to Wapping via a line alongside the New Cut. A Coal Concentration Depot owned by Western Fuels was established at Wapping Wharf just behind the Industrial Museum but this closed in 1987.

==== Underfall Yard ====
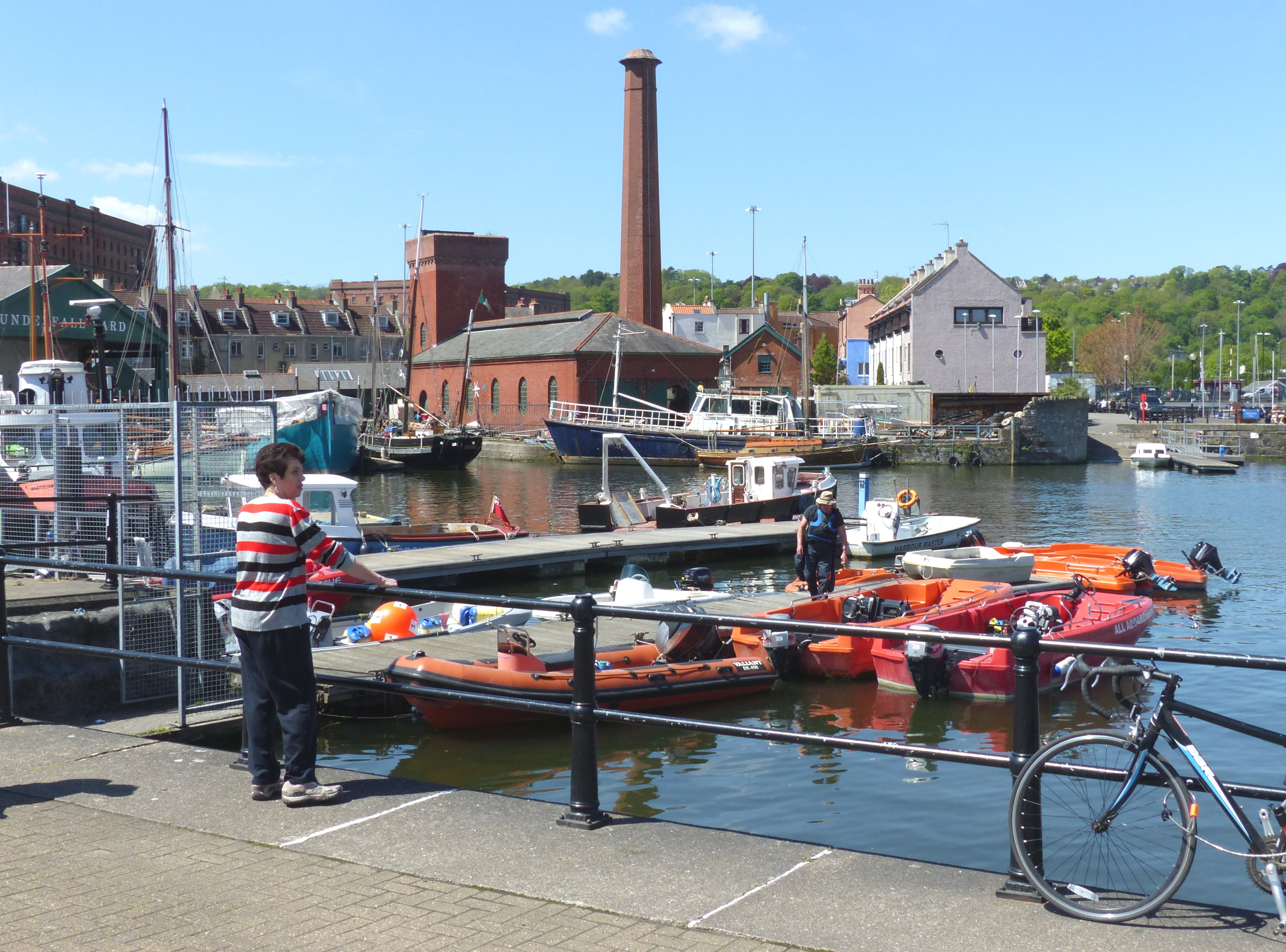
Entrance to the Underfall Yard

The docks maintenance facility was established on the land exposed by the damming of the river to construct the harbour and remains sited at this location to the present day. William Jessop had created a weir in the dam at Underfall to allow surplus water to flow back into the New Cut; this was known as the 'Overfall'. By the 1830s, the Floating Harbour was suffering from severe silting. Isambard Kingdom Brunel was, however, able to devise a solution to this problem. In place of the Overfall he advised better use of three shallow sluices and one deep scouring sluice between the harbour and the New Cut, together with a dredging vessel. This drag boat would scrape the silt away from the quay walls. When the deep sluice opened at low tide, a powerful undertow sucked the silt into the river to be carried away on the next tide. The shallow sluices enabled adjustment of the dock water level according to weather conditions.

Several old buildings, which date from the 1880s, remain at Underfall Yard and have listed building status. The octagonal brick and terracotta chimney of the hydraulic engine house dates from 1888, and is grade II* listed, as is the hydraulic engine house itself. It is built of red brick with a slate roof and contains pumping machinery, installed in 1907 by Fullerton, Hodgart and Barclay of Paisley, which powers the dock's hydraulic system of cranes, bridges and locks. The former pattern-maker's shop and stores date from the same period and are grade II listed, as are the Patent slip and quay walls.

==== Warehouses ====
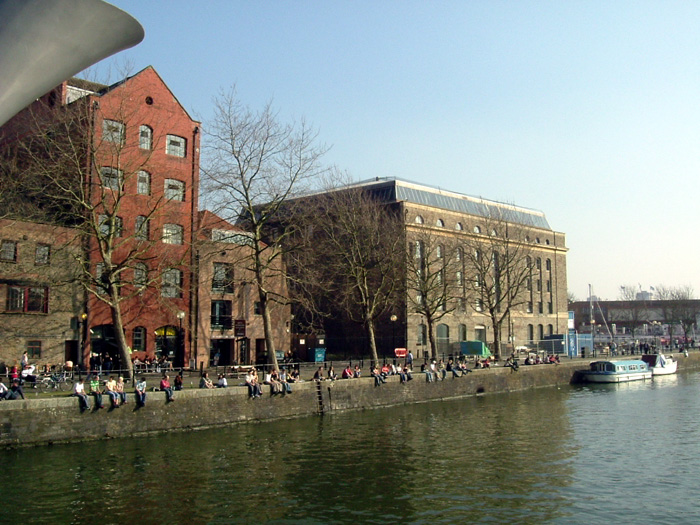
The Arnolfini

A large number of warehouses were built around the harbour for storage and trade. Many survive today and some are being converted into apartment blocks but many have been demolished as part of the regeneration of the area.

One which has survived is the A Bond Tobacco Warehouse, which was built in 1905 and was the first of the three brick built bonded warehouses in the Cumberland Basin, and is a grade II listed building.

B Bond Warehouse dates from 1908 and was the first in Britain to use Edmond Coignet's reinforced concrete system. It is now used by Bristol City Council and houses Bristol Archives, the CREATE Centre and council offices.

Robinson's Warehouse built in 1874 by William Bruce Gingell, and the Granary on Welsh Back are examples of the Bristol Byzantine style with coloured brick and Moorish arches.

The Arnolfini art gallery occupies Bush House, a 19th-century Grade II* listed tea warehouse, and the Watershed Media Centre occupies another disused warehouse.

=== 20th century improvements ===
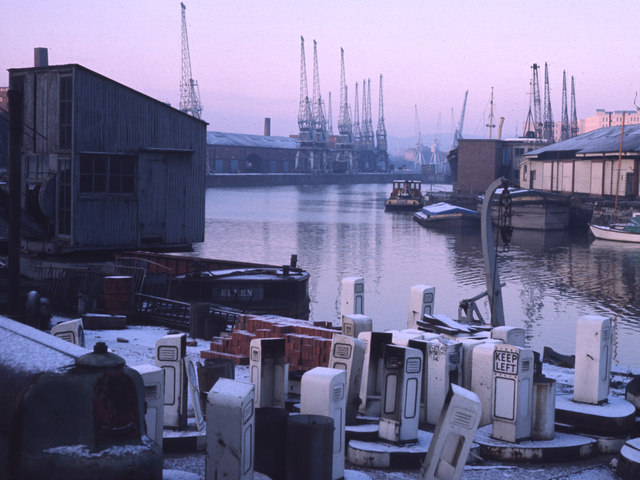
City Docks looking West from near Redcliffe Bridge in 1971

In 1908, the Royal Edward Dock was built in Avonmouth and in 1972 the large deep water Royal Portbury Dock was constructed on the opposite side of the mouth of the Avon, making the Bristol City Docks in the floating harbour redundant as a freight dock. However, the city centre docks continued to be used for smaller trading ships until the early 1970s, despite suffering significant damage to its infrastructure during the Bristol Blitz.

In 1977 Charles Hill & Sons, the last shipbuilder at the Albion Yard, closed after delivering the 1,541 tonne beer tanker Miranda Guinness. Part of the yard reopened in 1980 when Abels Shipbuilders began operating. It produced a steady stream of small ferries, survey vessels, tugs and other craft before going out of business in 2006.

Amey Roadstone (formerly T R Brown and Holms Sand & Gravel) sand dredgers worked from Poole's Wharf in Hotwells until 1991. Occasionally coastal trading vessels enter the Cumberland Basin to be loaded with large steel silos manufactured by Braby Ltd at their nearby Ashton Gate works.

The old Junction Lock swing bridge is powered by water pressure from the Underfall Yard hydraulic engine house at 750 psi (5,200 kPa; 52 bar). The new Plimsoll Bridge, completed in 1965, has a more modern electro-hydraulic system using oil at a pressure of 4,480 psi (30,900 kPa; 309 bar).

==== Regeneration of the harbourside ====
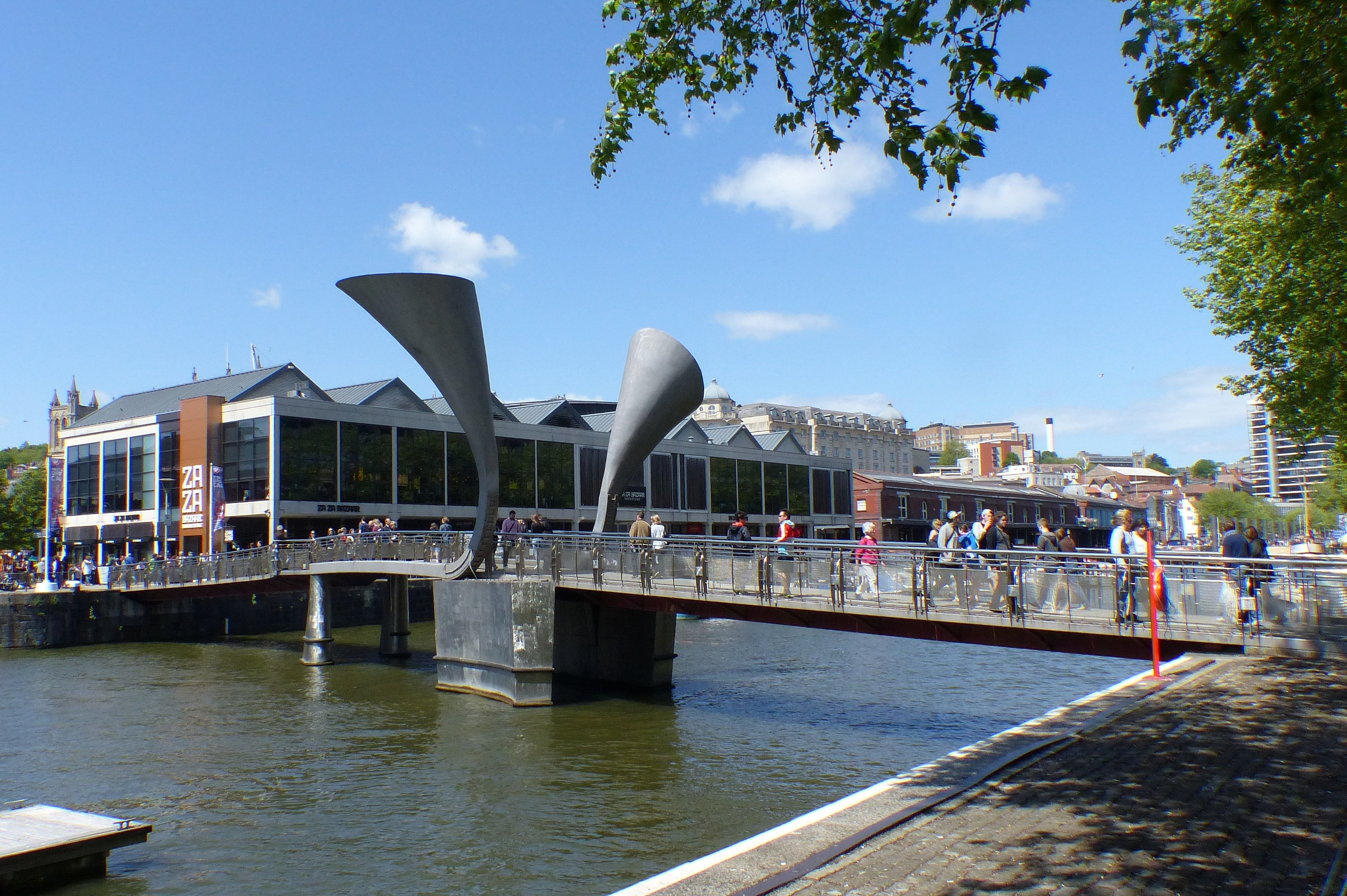
Pero’s Bridge is a bascule bridge over Bristol Harbour. The two horns are counter weights to assist when the two halves open. The buildings beyond are the Watershed.

The Arnolfini moved to its present location in 1975, the Bristol Industrial Museum opened in 1978 and the Watershed Media Centre in 1982. Since the 1980s, millions of pounds have been spent regenerating the harbourside. In 1999, Pero's Bridge was constructed, linking the @Bristol exhibition with Bristol tourist attractions. In 2000, the @Bristol centre opened on semi-derelict land at Canon's Marsh and some of the existing Grade II listed buildings were refurbished and reused. It was funded with £44.3 million from the National Lottery, the Millennium Commission, South West of England Regional Development Agency, and a further £43.4 million from Bristol City Council and commercial partners, including Nestlé. Private investors are also constructing studio apartment buildings.

The regeneration of the Canon's Marsh area is expected to cost £240 million. Crest Nicholson were the lead developers, constructing 450 new flats, homes and waterside offices. It is being carried out under the guidance of The Harbourside Sponsors’ Group, which is a partnership between the City Council, key stakeholders, developers, businesses, operators and funders.

The Cumberland Basin & Baltic Wharf are used by a variety of small boats by Baltic Wharf Sailing Club and is surrounded by tourist attractions. The old hydraulic pumping station has been converted into a pub and is a Grade II listed building.

There are two (since 2016) active boat building companies in the harbour: Bristol Classic Boat Company and the Slipway Co-operative at the Underfall Yard.

=== The harbour today ===
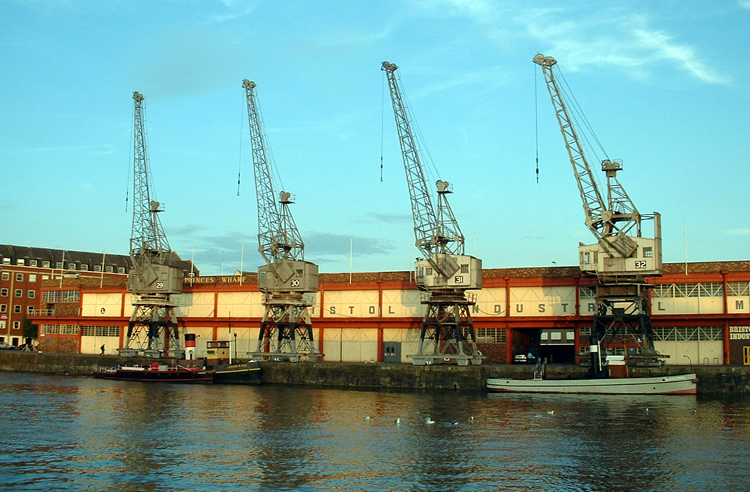
The former Bristol Industrial Museum, now M Shed

The harbour is now a tourist attraction with museums, galleries, exhibitions, bars and nightclubs. Former workshops and warehouses have now largely been converted or replaced by cultural venues, such as the Arnolfini art gallery, Watershed media and arts centre, M Shed museum, Antlers Gallery and the We The Curious science exhibition centre, as well as a number of fashionable apartment buildings. The Bristol Harbour Railway, operated by M Shed, runs between the museum and the CREATE Centre on some weekends and bank holidays. Historic boats are permanently berthed in the harbour. These include Isambard Kingdom Brunel's SS Great Britain, which was the first iron-hulled and propeller-driven ocean liner; and a replica of the Matthew, in which John Cabot sailed to North America in 1497. The historic vessels of M Shed museum, which include the steam tug Mayflower, firefloat Pyronaut and motor tug John King, are periodically operated.

Bristol Ferry Boats and Number Seven Boat Trips operate ferry services along the harbour from near Temple Meads station to the Underfall Yard, serving landing stages in the city centre and close to most of the harbour-side attractions. A separate cross-harbour ferry carries pedestrians from the ferry landing at the Great Britain to the new harbour inlet opposite. Bristol Packet Boat Trips offer regular harbour tours with commentaries and river cruises on the Tower Belle up the River Avon to Conham, Hanham and Bath and downstream to Avonmouth.

In late July each year, the Bristol Harbour Festival is held, resulting in an influx of boats, including tall ships, Royal Navy vessels and lifeboats. There is a bylaw that prohibit swimming in the docks, with a fine of up to £1,000 for infringement.

== Events ==
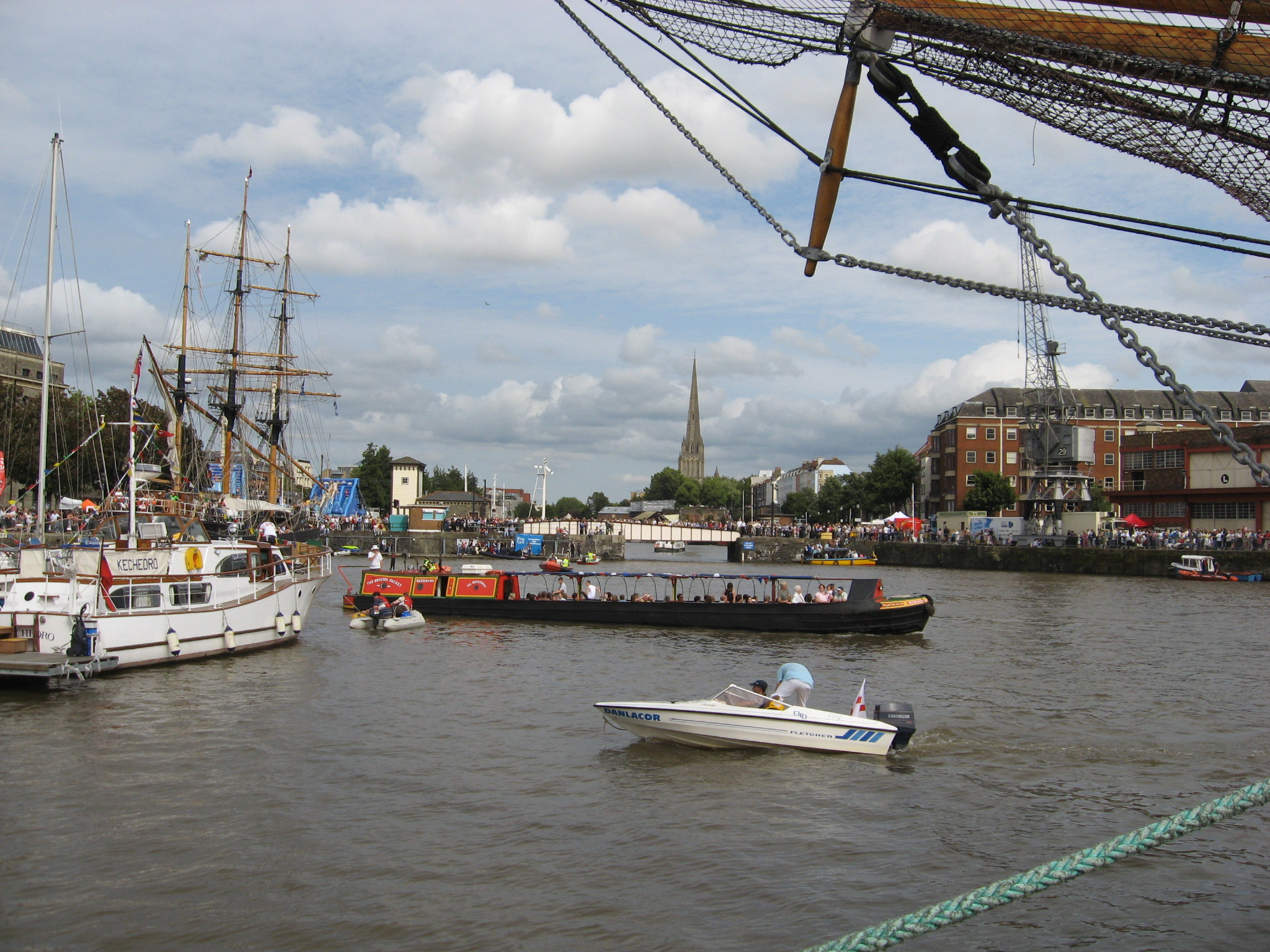
Bristol harbour festival

Bristol Harbour hosts the Bristol Harbour Festival in July of each year, attended by tall ships and hundreds of ships and boats of all kinds. About 200,000 visitors view the boats, and watch live music, street performances and other entertainments.

In 1996, the harbour was the setting for the first International Festival of the Sea. A larger version of the annual harbour festivals, this was attended by many tall ships, including the Eye of the Wind, Pride of Baltimore, Rose, Kaskelot and Earl of Pembroke. The key theme was John Cabot's pioneering voyage of discovery to the Americas and a replica of Cabot's ship, the Matthew, was dedicated prior to its reenactment of Cabot's voyage the following year. In 2009, the 200th anniversary of the Floating Harbour was commemorated with a series of celebratory events.

In June 2020, the statue of Bristol slave trader Edward Colston was pushed into the harbour by protestors, after being pulled down from its plinth, jumped upon and daubed in paint.

== Gallery: Historic Images of Bristol Harbour ==
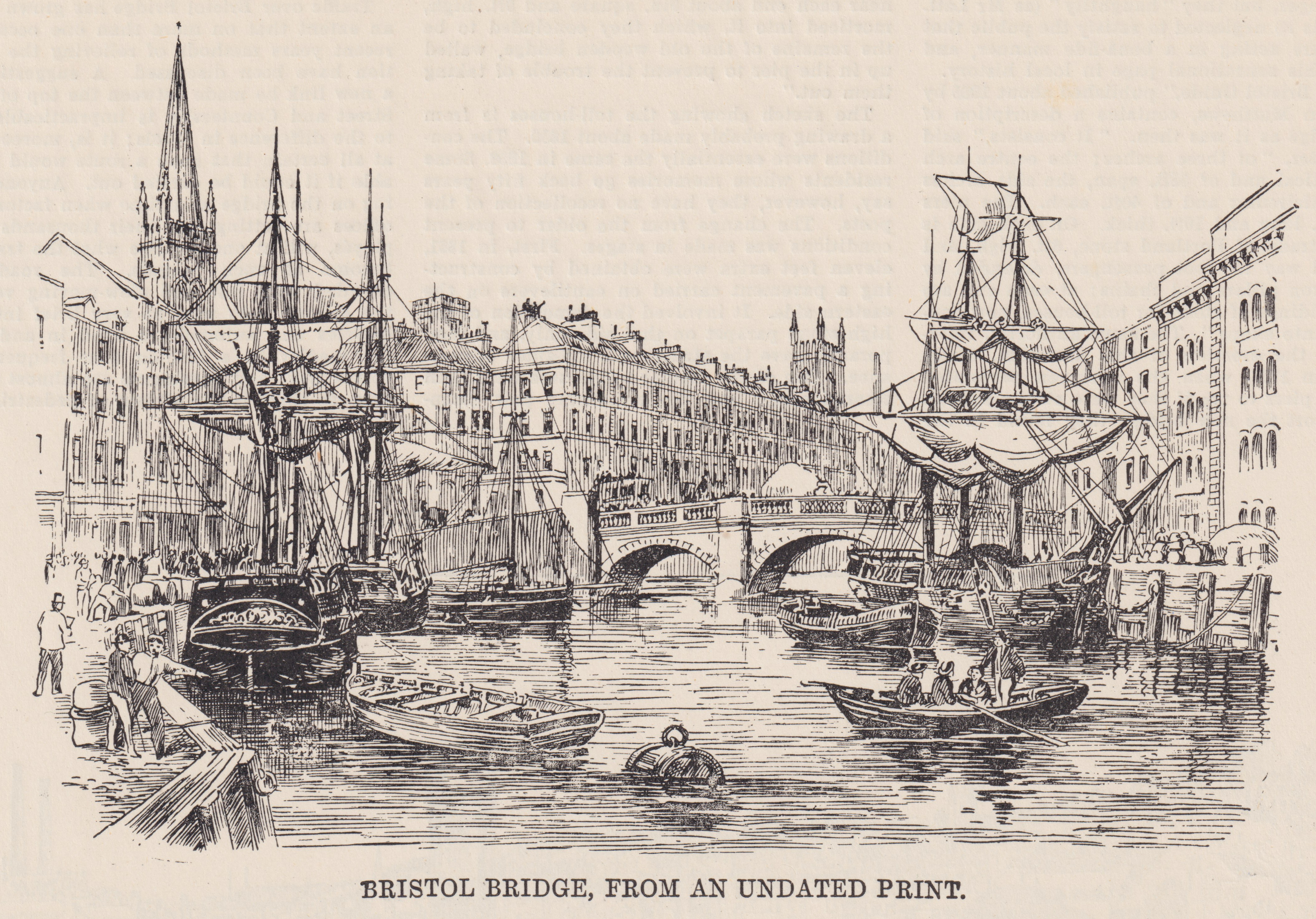
Bristol Bridge and harbour c.1850

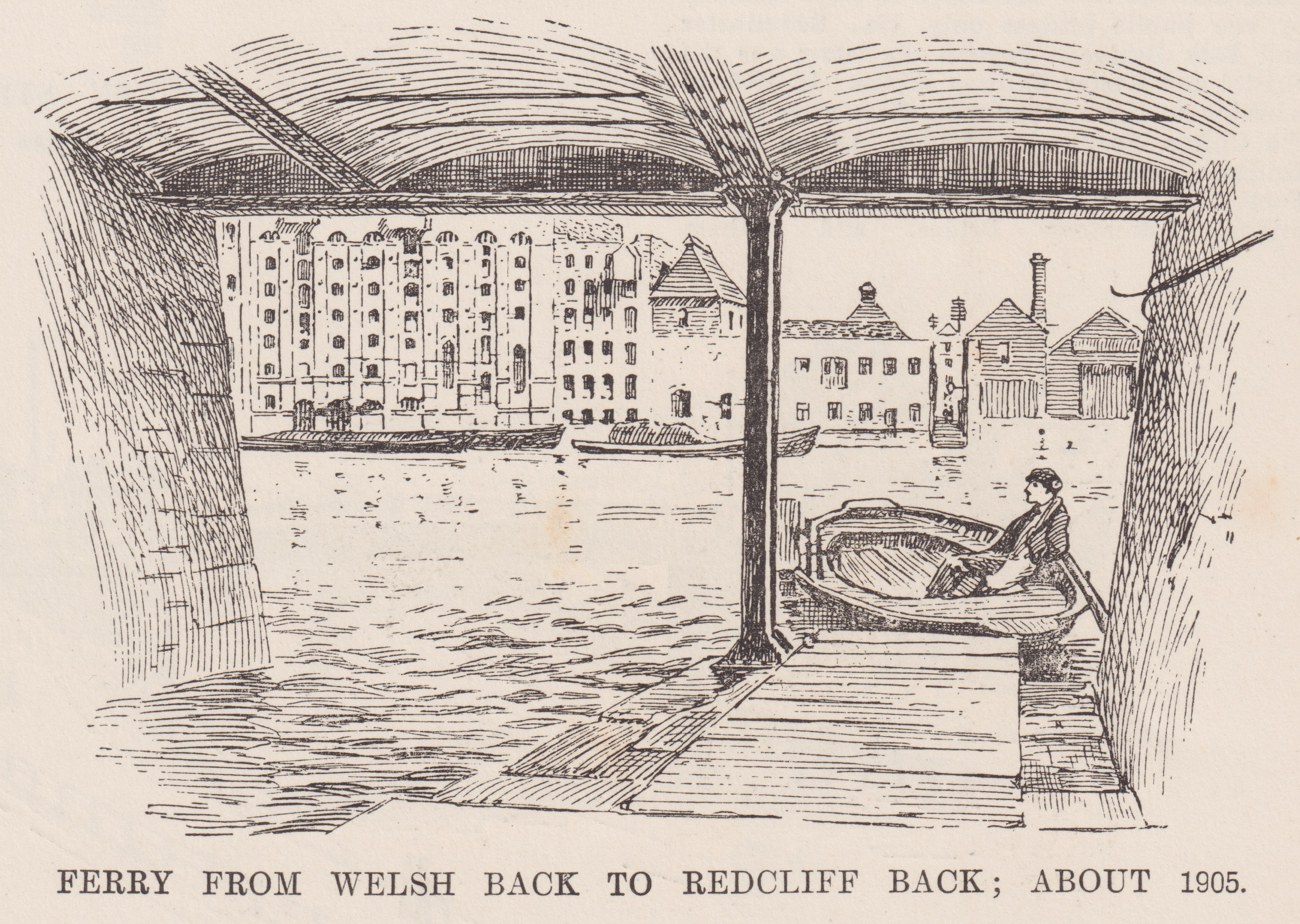
Welsh Back Ferry, 1905

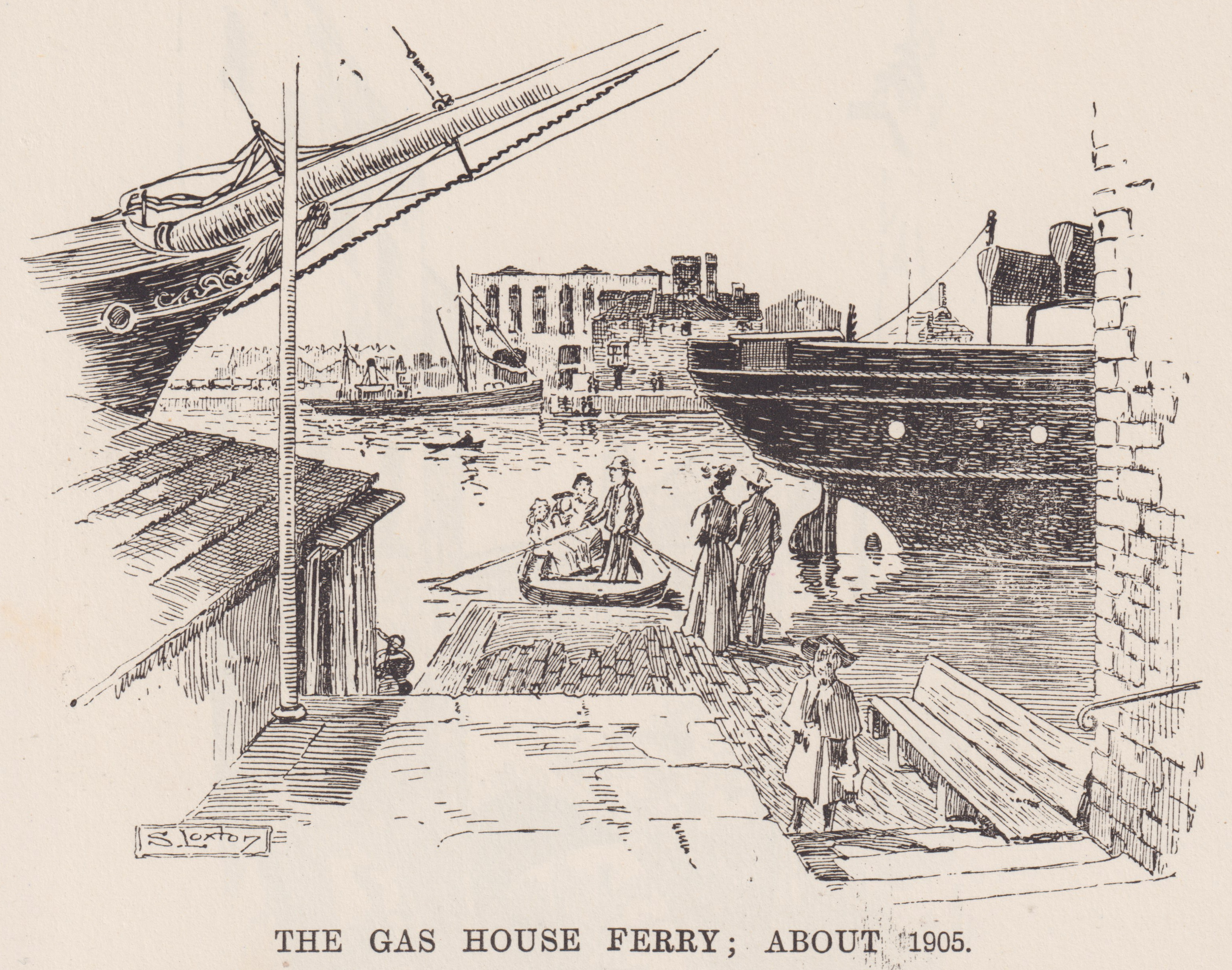
Gas House Ferry, 1905

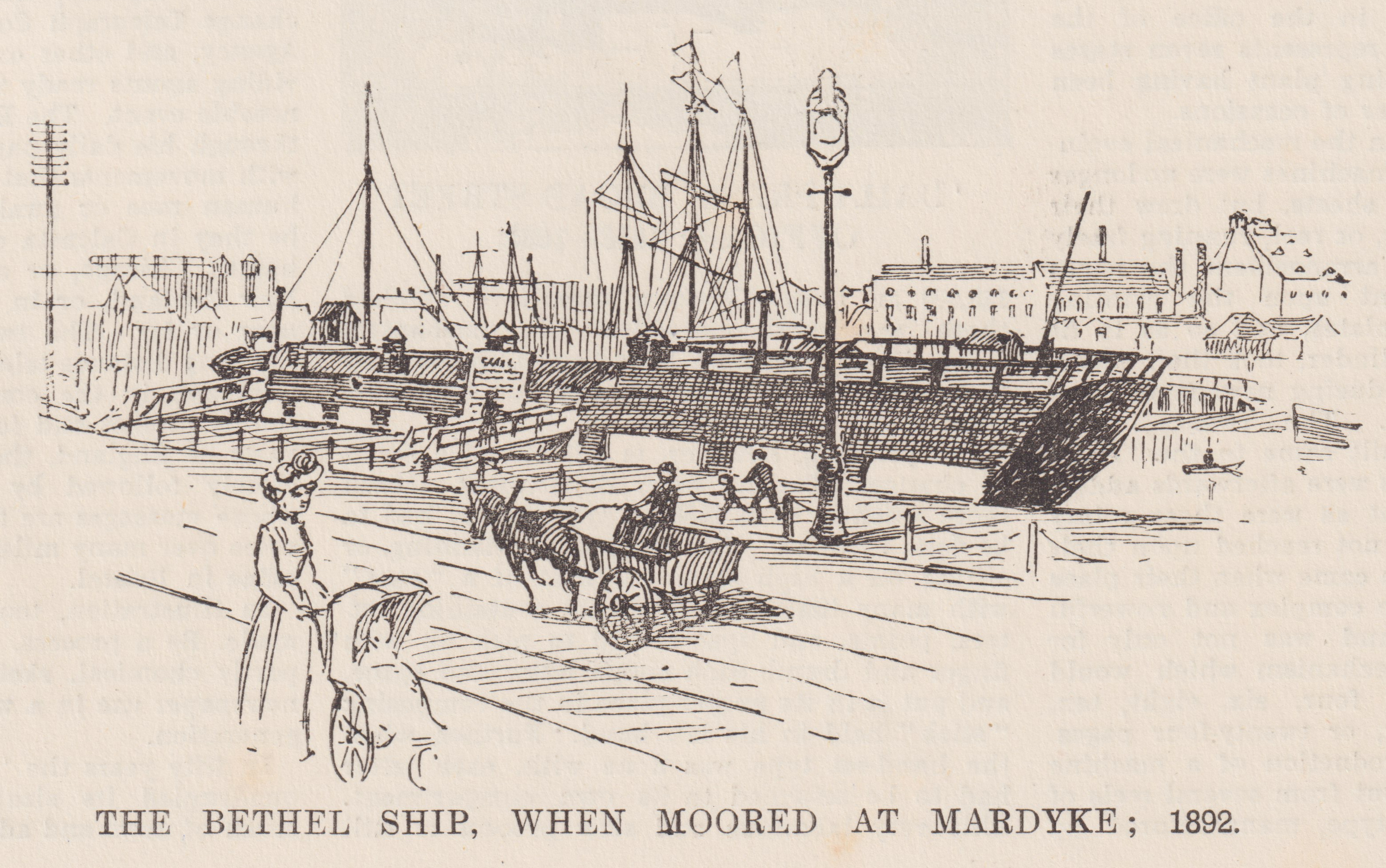
The Bethel Ship, Floating Harbour, 1892

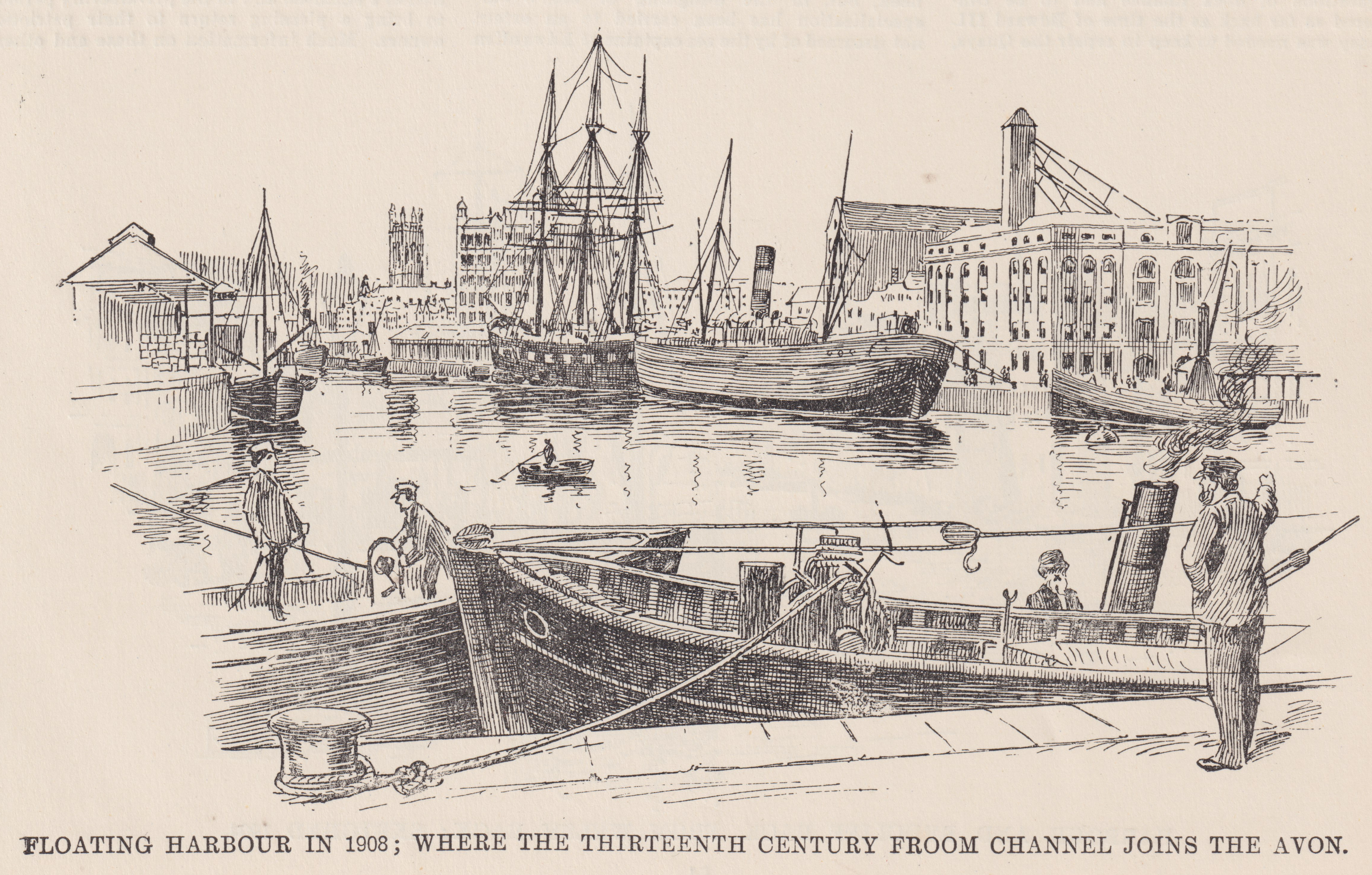
Floating Harbour at the junction of the Frome

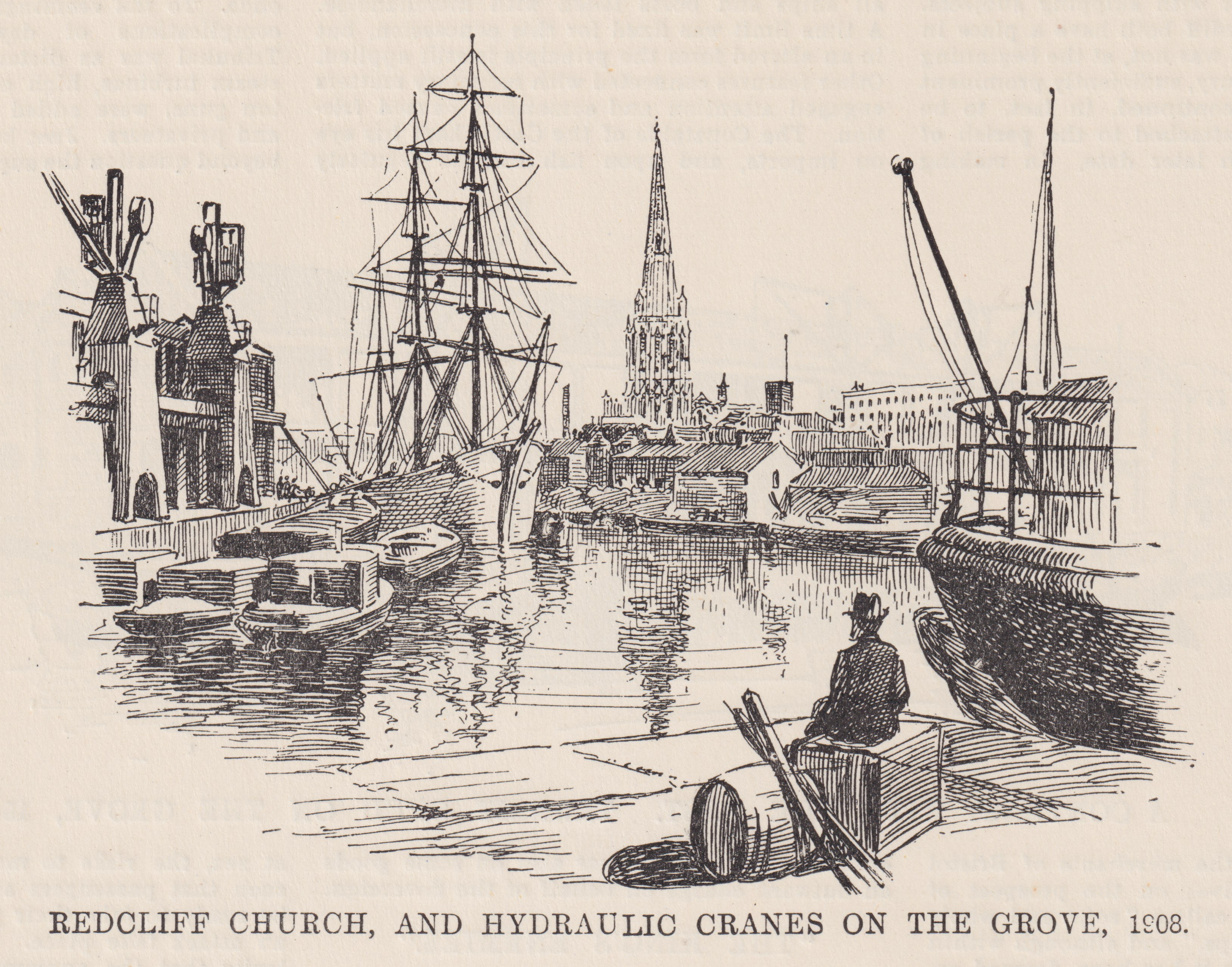
Floating Harbour near Redcliffe Church, 1908

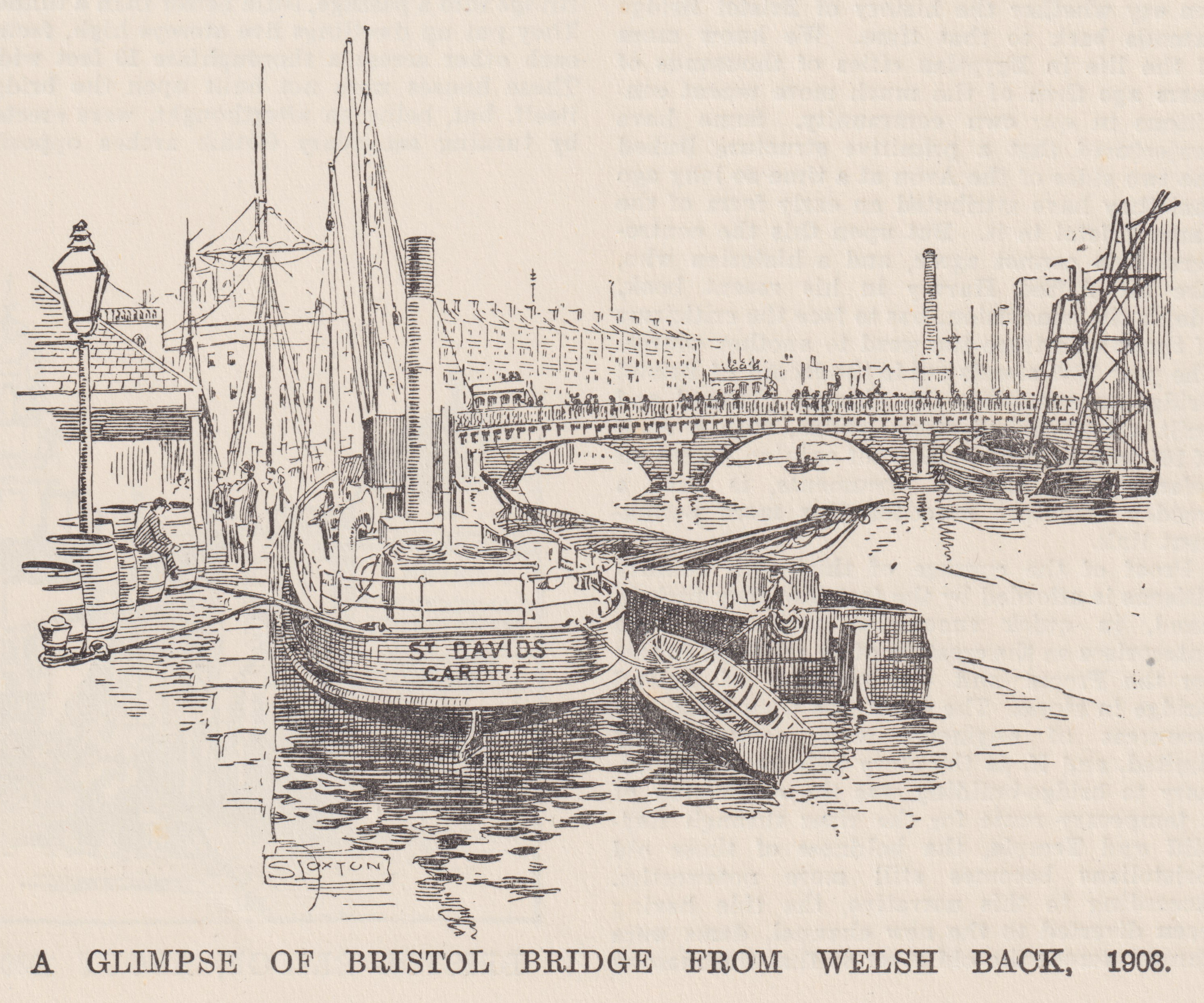
Welsh Back and Bristol Bridge, 1908

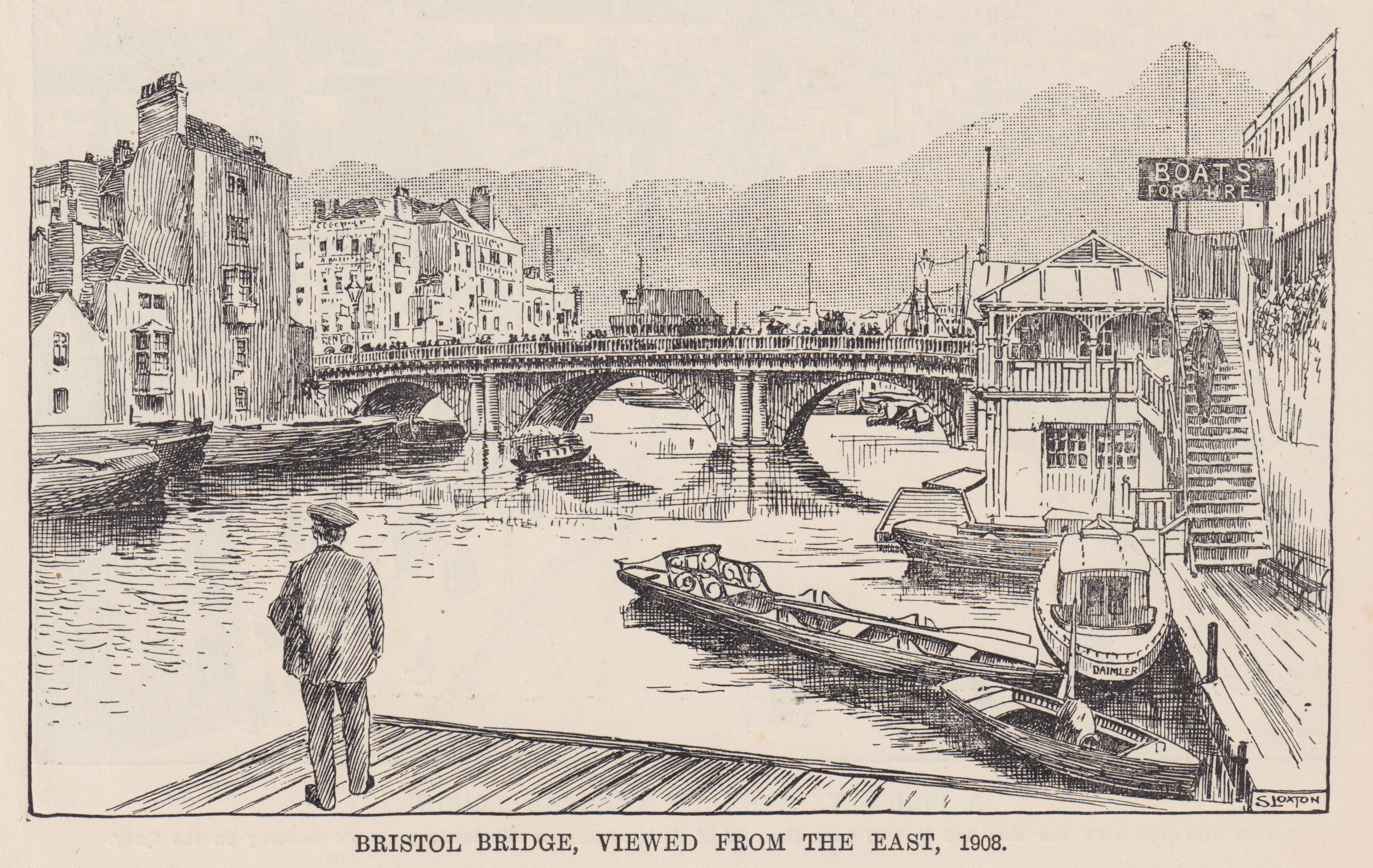
Bristol Bridge from the east, 1908

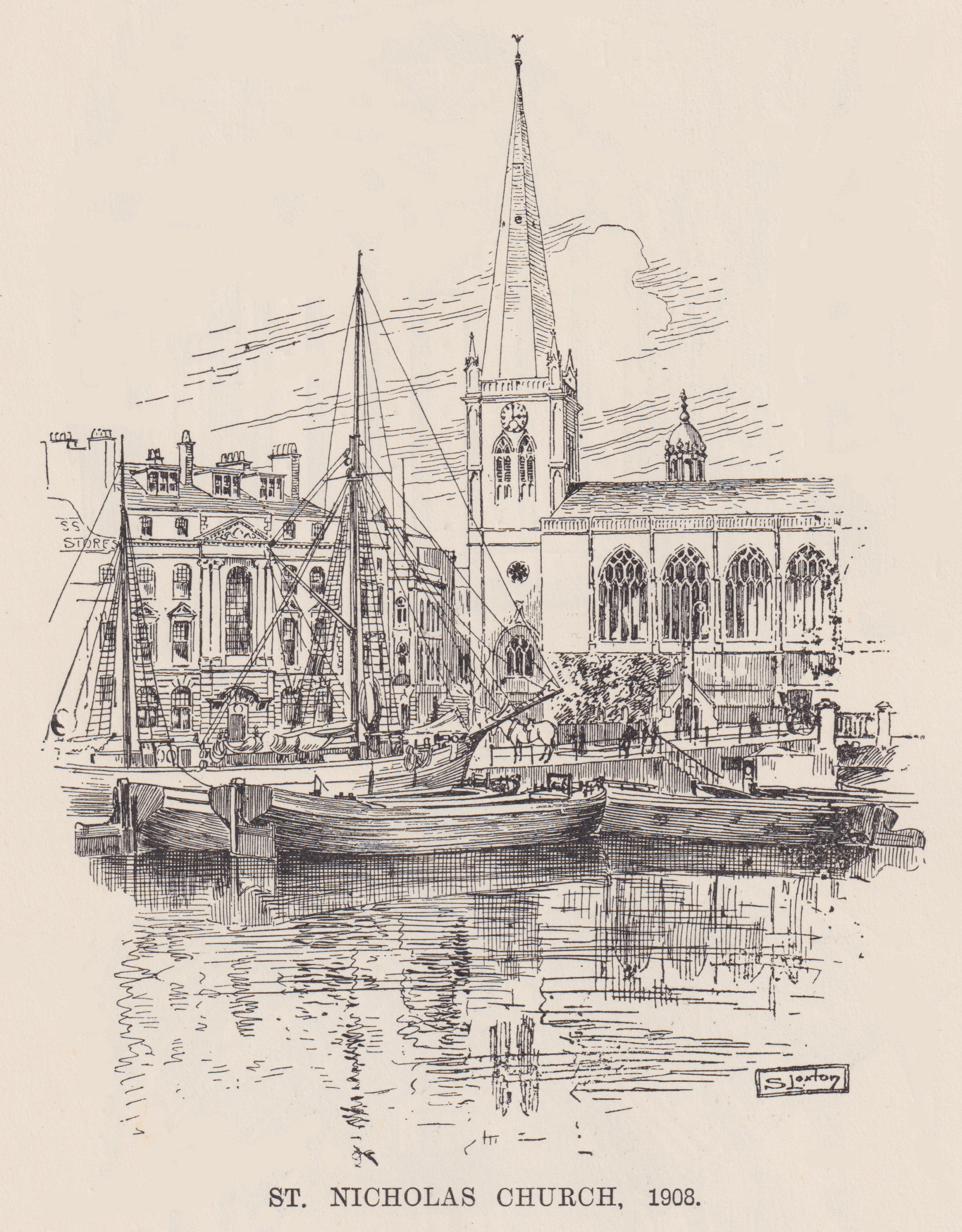
St Nicholas Church and harbour, 1908

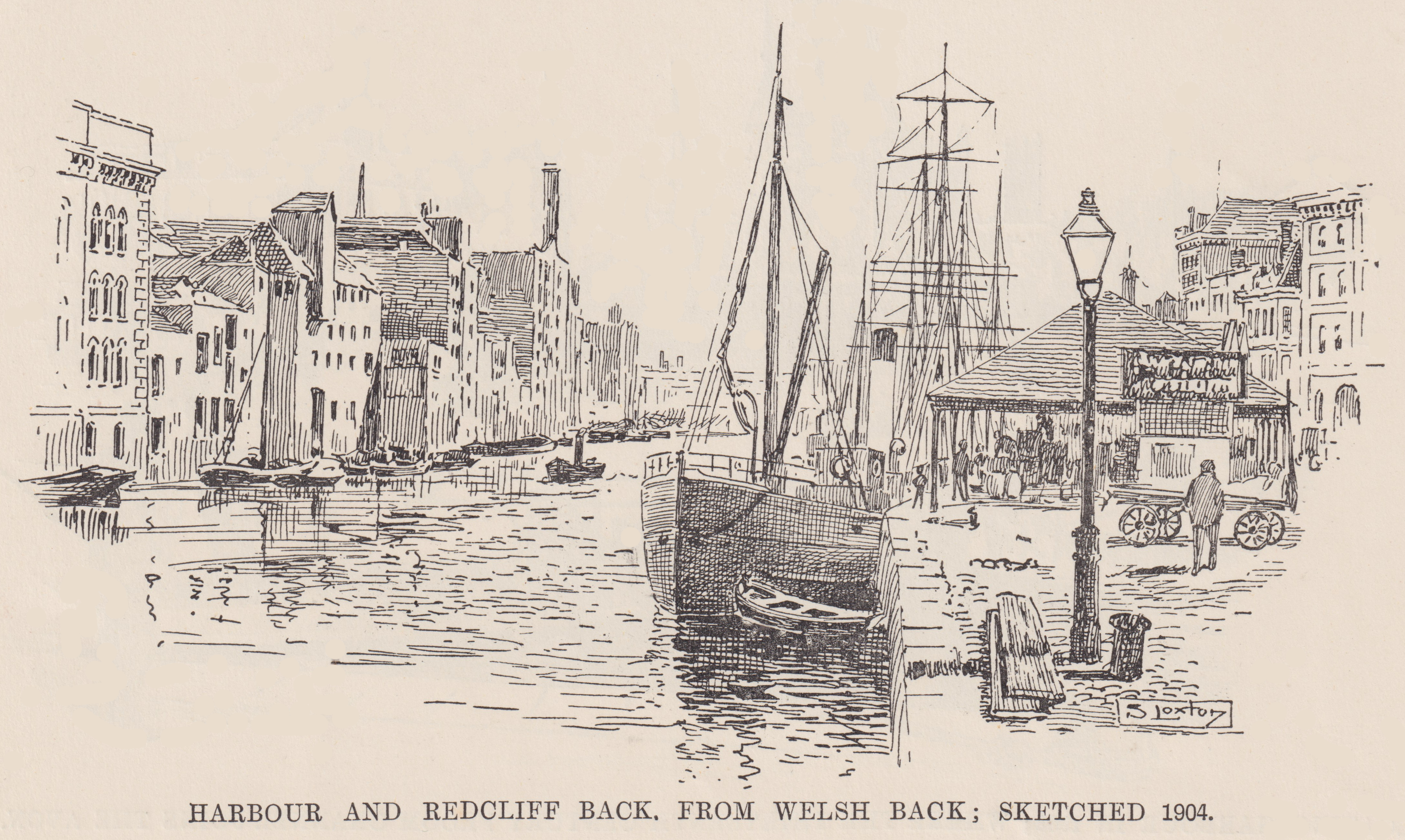
Harbour and Redicliff Back Bristol 1904

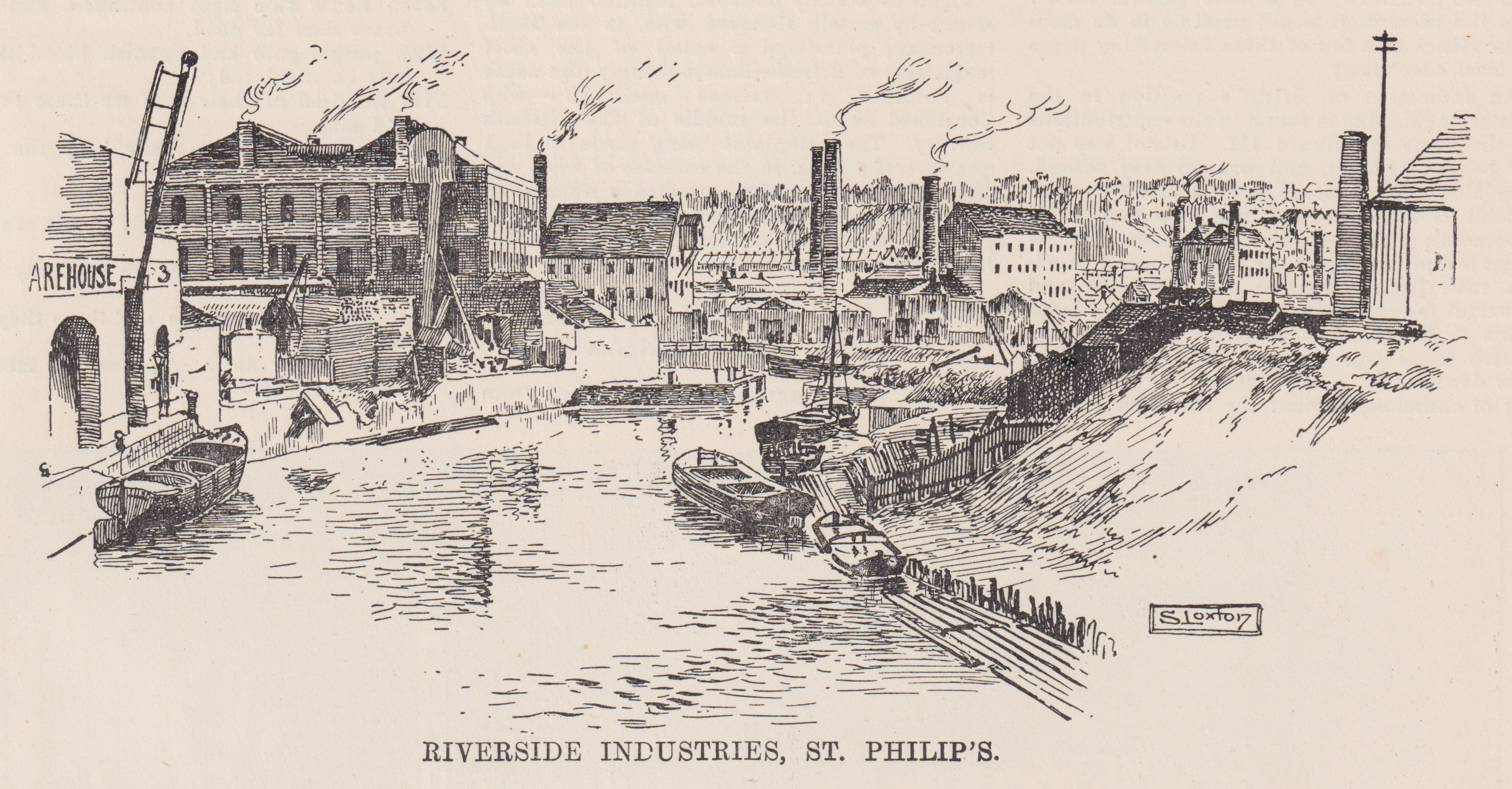
Riverside Industries, St Philips, Bristol, 1908

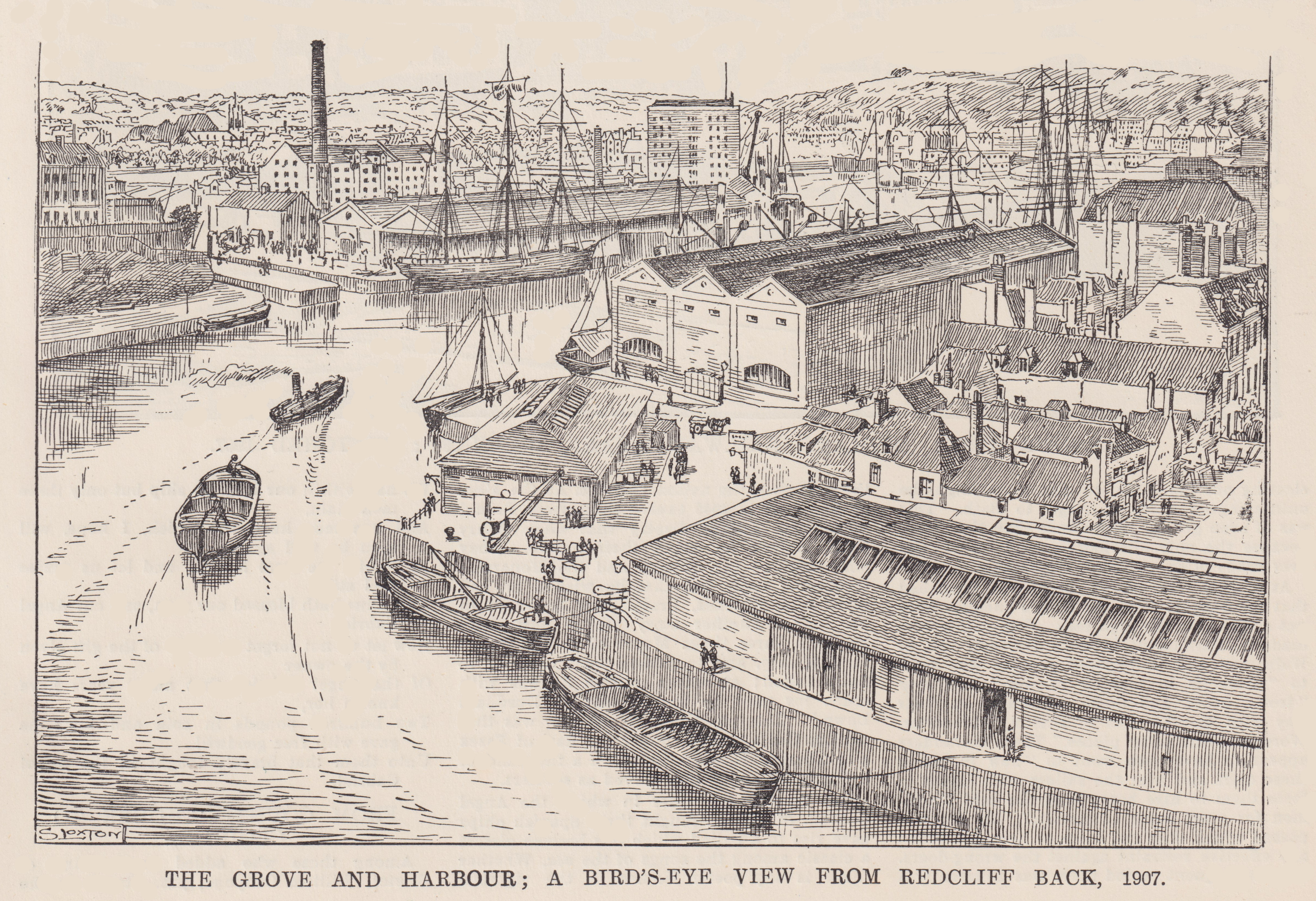
The Grove and Harbour, Bristol, 1907

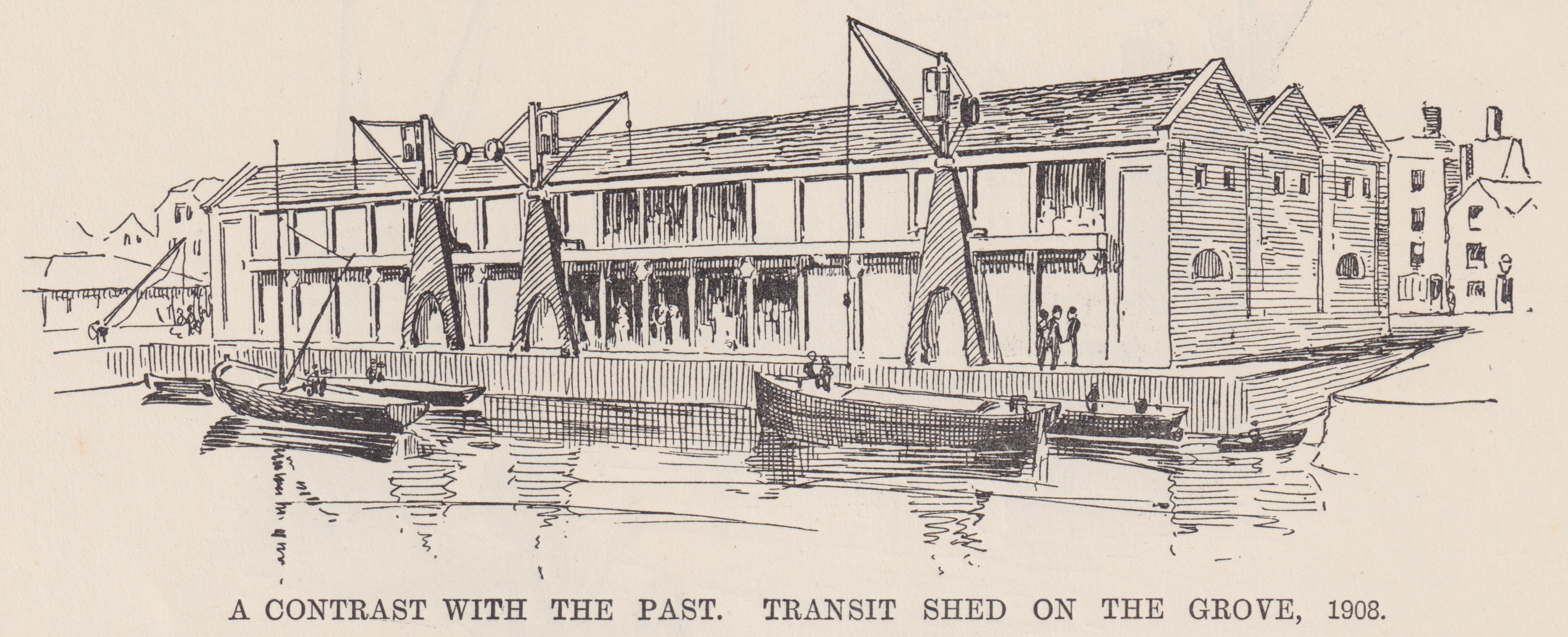
Transit Shed on The Grove, Bristol Harbour, 1908

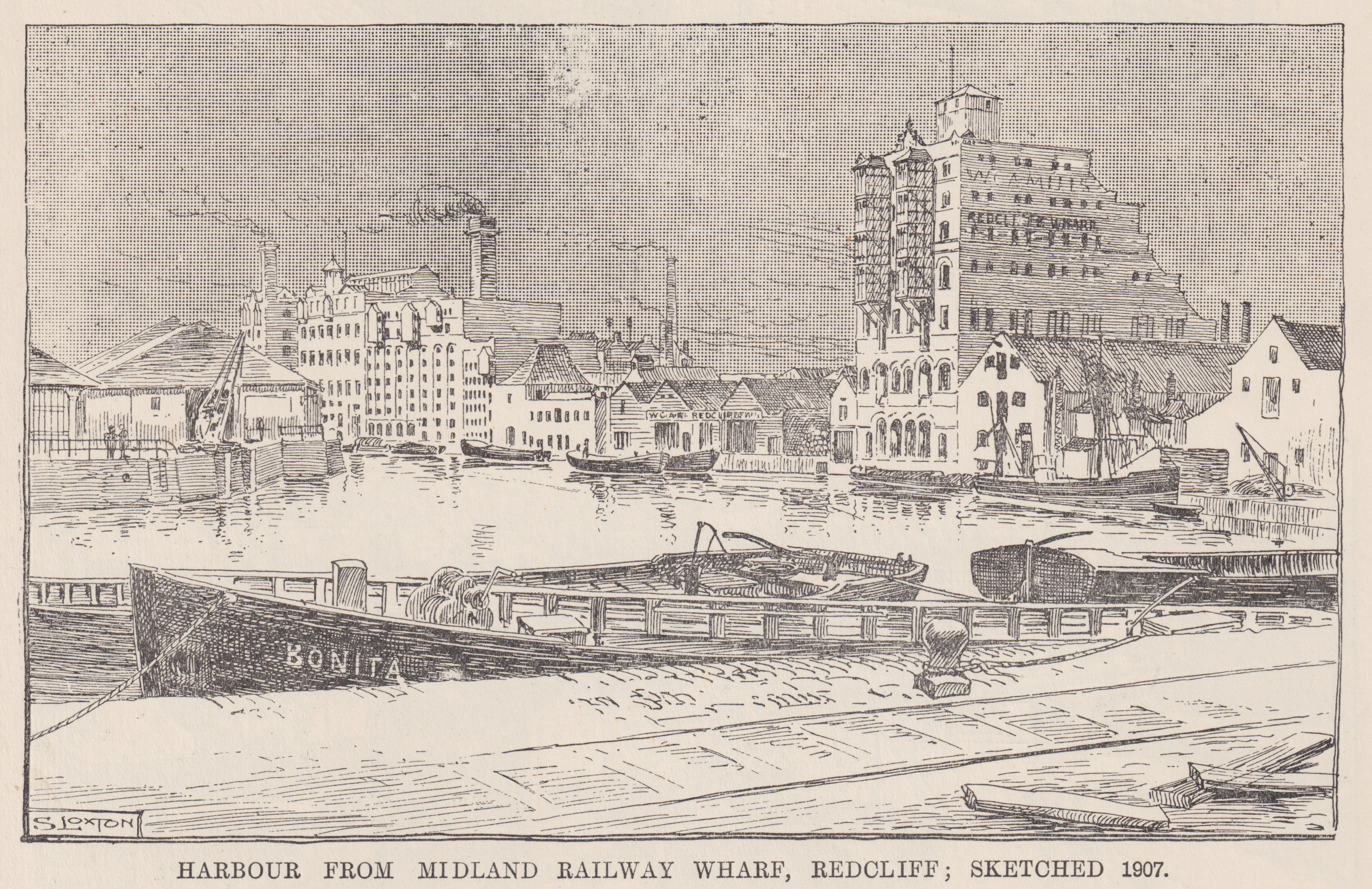
Bristol Harbour from Redcliffe, 1907

== See also ==
- Port of Bristol
- Bristol Harbour Festival
- Bristol Marina
