= Millennium Square, Bristol =

Square in Bristol, England

Coordinates: 51°26′59″N 2°36′01″W

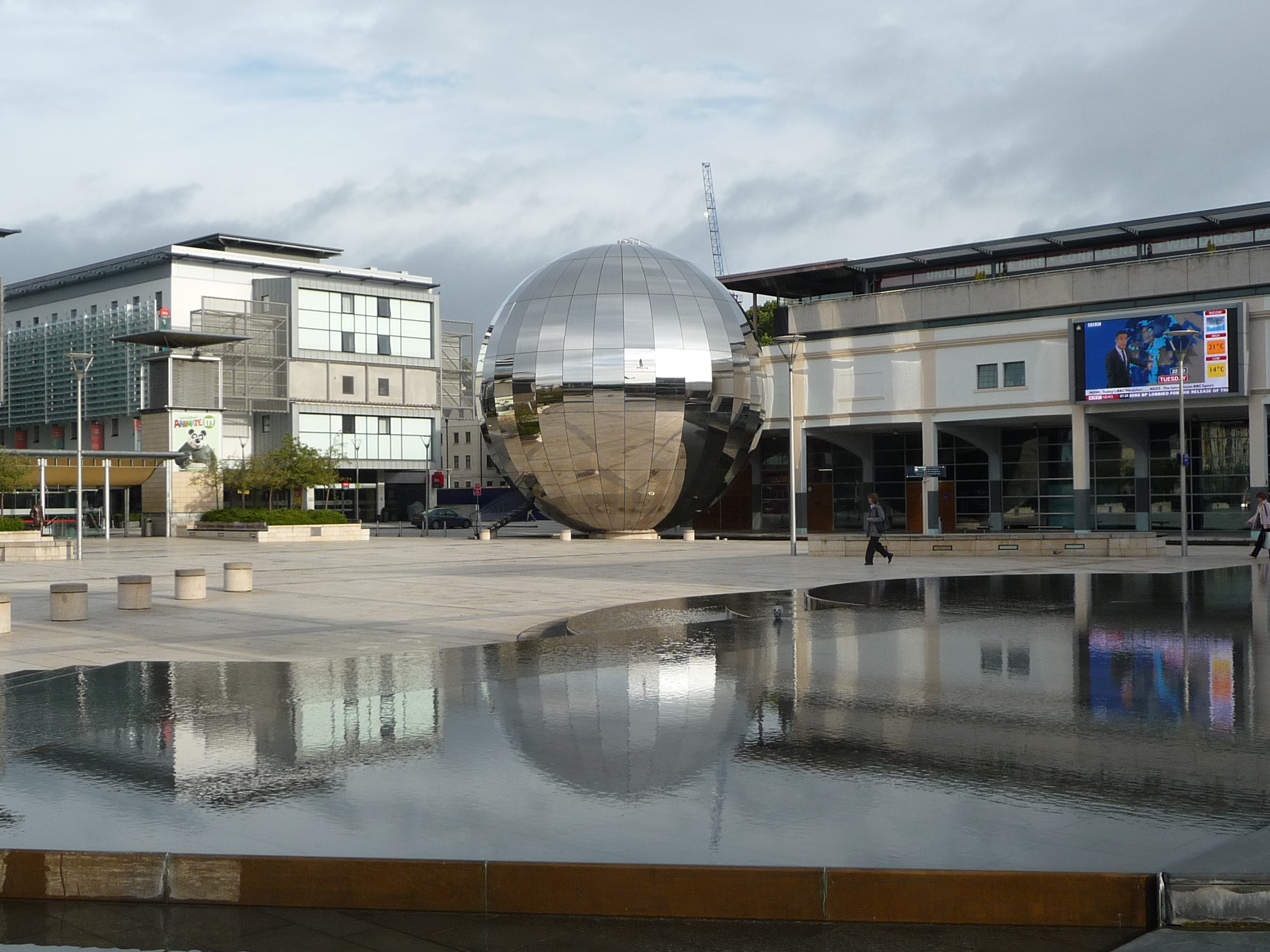
Millennium Square, Bristol

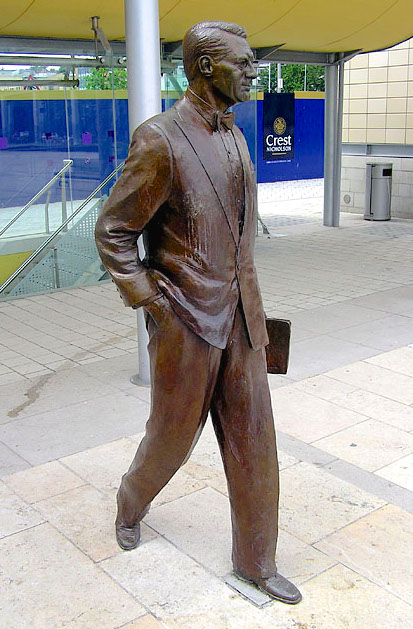
Statue of Cary Grant in the square

Millennium Square is a city square in the Canon's Marsh area of Bristol, England. It was built in the late 1990s as part of the harbourside regeneration and We The Curious (then named @Bristol) development, and has become a popular public area and event space. The square is a 55 by 40 metres (180 by 131 ft) pedestrianised space, joined at its northeast corner to the smaller Anchor Square, forming part of the Brunel Mile, a sequence of traffic-free and low-traffic spaces forming a route through central Bristol.

The square sits above a 2-storey underground car park and is flanked by ten ventilation towers.

== Attractions ==
We The Curious, a hands-on science museum, stands to the north in a grade II listed former railway goods shed, behind a reflecting pool that runs the length of the square. The museum's planetarium – a 15-metre (50 ft) diameter sphere clad with mirrors designed to appear to float in the pool – is a prominent landmark in the northwest corner of the square.

Along the east side of the square is a large water sculpture, Aquarena, designed by William Pye, containing fountain walls and terraced cascades, which is often used as a paddling pool on warm days.

Millennium Square regularly hosts free public events, such as music and entertainment during the Bristol Harbour Festival. It is home to a BBC Big Screen, which was installed in 2008 and upgraded in 2020. which has been used to screen sporting events, and state occasions.

There are several permanent statues and sculptures in the square, including:

- Cary Grant: a bronze statue of the Bristol-born actor by sculptor Graham Ibbeson, which was unveiled by Grant's widow in 2001.
- William Penn, William Tyndale and Thomas Chatterton: bronze statues seated on various benches in the square, by Lawrence Holofcener.
- "Bill and Bob": a pair of painted bronze Jack Russell Terrier dogs set into the paved surface, as if they were swimming, by Cathie Pilkington. One of the dogs was stolen in 2021.
- "Telespine", a 20 metres (66 ft) steel tower shaped like a vertebral column, designed by architect Chee Horng Chang and Concept Planning Group and installed in 2000 to disguise telecommunications equipment on the south side of the square.
- "Zenith", an arc of 52 lights embedded in the paving representing the analemma, by David Ward.

Alongside these, the square regularly hosts temporary art installations and touring exhibitions, which have included the Bristol Whales, by Cod Steaks, in 2015, and installations for Bristol Light Festival since 2020.

== History ==
The area now occupied by Millennium Square had been a railway yard handling cargo for Bristol Harbour, and in 1906 the Great Western Railway built a goods shed – the present We The Curious building – pioneering the use of François Hennebique's reinforced concrete system. After the decline of the city docks in the mid-20th century, the derelict became a makeshift surface car park from the 1970s while the future of the site was considered. Regeneration proceeded slowly, and by the mid-1990s the only developments to have been completed were Canons House and Lloyds Amphitheatre, adjoining Millennium Square to the south, and the conversion of some of the quayside transit sheds to hospitality and cultural uses to the east.

Millennium Square, alongside Anchor Square and Pero's Bridge, were part of a package of investment in the public realm and cultural facilities made in the late 1990s intended to accelerate the wider regeneration of the site, supported in part by National Lottery funding through the Millennium Commission. The square was designed by Bristol-based Alex French Architects, and construction completed in 1998. Construction of commercial buildings facing the west side of the square followed in the mid-2000s.

== See also ==
- List of public art in Bristol
