= BBC Big Screen =

Large video screens located across the United Kingdom

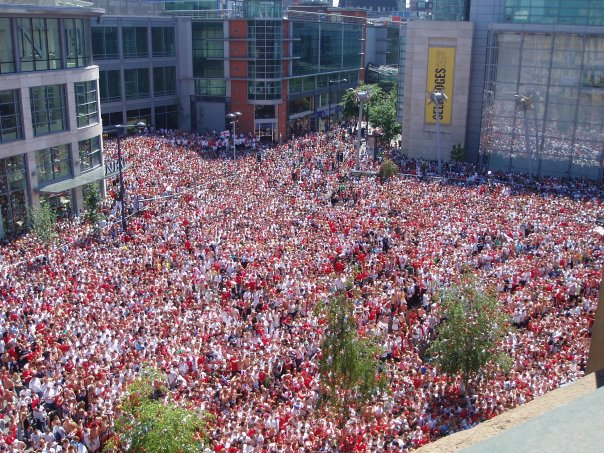
Exchange Square in Manchester during a BBC Big Screen showing of a FIFA World Cup football game.

The BBC Big Screens are 25-square-metre (270 ft^{2}) LED screens with sound systems situated in prominent locations in city centres in the United Kingdom. The project setting up these screens involved the BBC, LOCOG (London Organising Committee of the Olympic Games and Paralympic Games), and local councils. The premise on which the screens are operated is as a platform for all, to provide local information, and to allow filmmakers and other visual artists a platform on which to display their work.

There are 21 Big Screens in cities across the UK. Between 2002 and 2013 the BBC operated these screens, but the BBC department to manage the screens centrally closed in 2013 following funding cuts. Since 2013, some of the screens have been decommissioned, and some have been transferred to local authority ownership, where they continue to operate.

== Locations ==
Belfast: Big Screen Belfast is in Donegall Square in the grounds of Belfast City Hall, and was installed in May 2011, the first Big Screen in Northern Ireland. In 2013 ownership of the screen transferred to Belfast City Council, but it was put up for auction in 2017 due to council funding cuts.

Birmingham: The Big Screen was temporarily installed adjacent to the Birmingham Town Hall during its refurbishment. The Big Screen in Birmingham was removed from Chamberlain Square on 19 September 2007 after the renovation of the Town Hall was completed. It was then erected in Victoria Square in November 2007. Some controversy has existed over the screen in terms of the number of objections to the renewal of its planning permission. Three years after it was due to be switched back on it had finally been fully activated. However, funding was cut by the BBC and the Big Screen was switched off on 10 December 2012, Birmingham City Council have yet to remove the screen due to budget cuts themselves. But was later removed permanently by September 2013.

Bradford: Big Screen Bradford is situated in Centenary Square, at the heart of Bradford City Centre. Adjacent to City Hall and the new urban park development.

Bristol: We The Curious Big Screen is a public screen based in Millennium Square, Bristol on the We The Curious building (formerly At-Bristol). The Big Screen was installed by the London Organising Committee for the London 2012 Olympic and Paralympic Games for the London 2012 Olympics (LOCOG). At the end of 2012, the Screen was gifted to Bristol City Council, who then gifted it to We The Curious. The Big Screen is now a free community resource that provides the people of Bristol with free film screenings, public information, and content, as well as providing local groups and charity organisations the opportunity to showcase their work and message.

Cardiff: Big Screen Cardiff is located at the Hayes.

Coventry: Big Screen Coventry is situated at the Coventry Transport Museum, Millennium Place. In 2018 it was revealed that the screen is no longer operational but has not been removed.

Derby: Big Screen Derby was installed in 2007. The screen was a partnership between the BBC, Derby City Council, the University of Derby and LOCOG and was located in the Market Place next to the Assembly Rooms. In early September 2013, the screen was removed by Derby City Council in a cost-cutting exercise, although its return in some form has not been ruled out.

Derry: Big Screen Derry was one of the most recent screens to be launched, and the second in Northern Ireland. It was installed in Waterloo Place in November 2011, and was a focal point during both the 2012 Olympics and also Derry's City of Culture celebrations in 2013. In 2017, Derry City Council suggested that it may be removed as the "location has not proved a success".

Dover: The Dover Big Screen was in Market Square, next to the museum and library. In September 2013, Dover District Council voted to remove it, due to maintenance costs, a lack of available parts and the BBC's decision to no longer provide content or technical support.

Edinburgh: Big Screen Edinburgh was located in Festival Square, across the road from the cultural trio of Usher Hall, Lyceum and Traverse Theatres. The screen was decommissioned by The City of Edinburgh Council in March 2015.

Leeds: Big Screen Leeds, launched in late 2005, can be found in Millennium Square.

Leicester: Big Screen Leicester was unveiled in January 2010 and is located in Humberstone Gate.

Manchester: Big Screen Manchester was the first Big Screen within the pilot project to be launched in May 2003. The BBC had already explored screens in relation to events such as Proms in the Park, the 2002 World Cup and the Manchester Commonwealth Games. For the Queen's Golden Jubilee ten temporary screens were installed in major cities around the UK. Due to their success, Manchester became the first permanent screen and from this the project has grown. Big Screen Manchester is housed in Exchange Square, a busy public area regenerated after the IRA bomb in 1996. A new Big Screen was installed Spring 2010, replacing the 7-year-old original.

Middlesbrough: Big Screen Middlesbrough is located in Centre Square. Removed in 2022 due to being non operational

Norwich: Big Screen Norwich is situated on Chapelfield Plain which is in the heart of Norwich City Centre.

Plymouth: Big Screen Plymouth is located in Armada Way on the Piazza.

Portsmouth: Big Screen Portsmouth is in Guildhall Square, beside the Civic Offices and Portsmouth Guildhall. It is currently operated as a partnership between Portsmouth City Council and University of Portsmouth.

Swansea: Big Screen Swansea is located in Castle Square, in the heart of the city centre. However, due to technical issues and a lack of maintenance, Big Screen Swansea stopped working

Swindon: Big Screen Swindon is sited within the town's main shopping centre at Wharf Green. The screen was bought for Swindon Borough Council by the New Swindon Company as part of a project to redevelop the Wharf Green area in 2008.

Waltham Forest: Waltham Forest is an outer London borough situated north east of the city. The Big Screen is located in Walthamstow Town Square, installed in time for the Beijing 2008 Olympics.

Woolwich: Woolwich, in the Royal Borough of Greenwich, received its Big Screen installation in General Gordon Square in 2009. The Big Screen was temporarily switched off during the redesign of General Gordon Place, 2010–2011.

== Previous locations ==
Hull: Big Screen Hull was launched for the beginning of the Summer Olympics in 2004. The screen's erection was the subject of controversy caused by the Opposition Liberal Democrats who claimed that Council Leader Colin Inglis had authorised the purchase of the screen without the matter reaching a council committee.In fact the contract with the BBC was authorised by a Decision Record of the relevant Cabinet Member without pre-decision scrutiny due to the need to finalise arrangements before the 2004 Olympics began. The Council had abolished Service Committees in 1998 when it moved to a Cabinet system with Scrutiny Committees and Area Committees with limited executive delegations pre-empting the changes created in local government by the 2000 Local Government Act. When the five-year contract between Hull City Council, Philips and the BBC ended in 2009, the then Liberal Democrat administration had the screen dismantled and moved into storage. It remained in an East Hull Council-owned warehouse for some years, its technology having been superseded by the time a Labour administration returned to power and sought it

Liverpool: Big Screen Liverpool was situated in Clayton Square, in the heart of Liverpool's retail quarter. In May 2015 it was announced that the screen was due to be removed due to unrepairable faults.
