= Bristol Harbour Festival =

English festival

Coordinates: 51°27′N 2°36′W

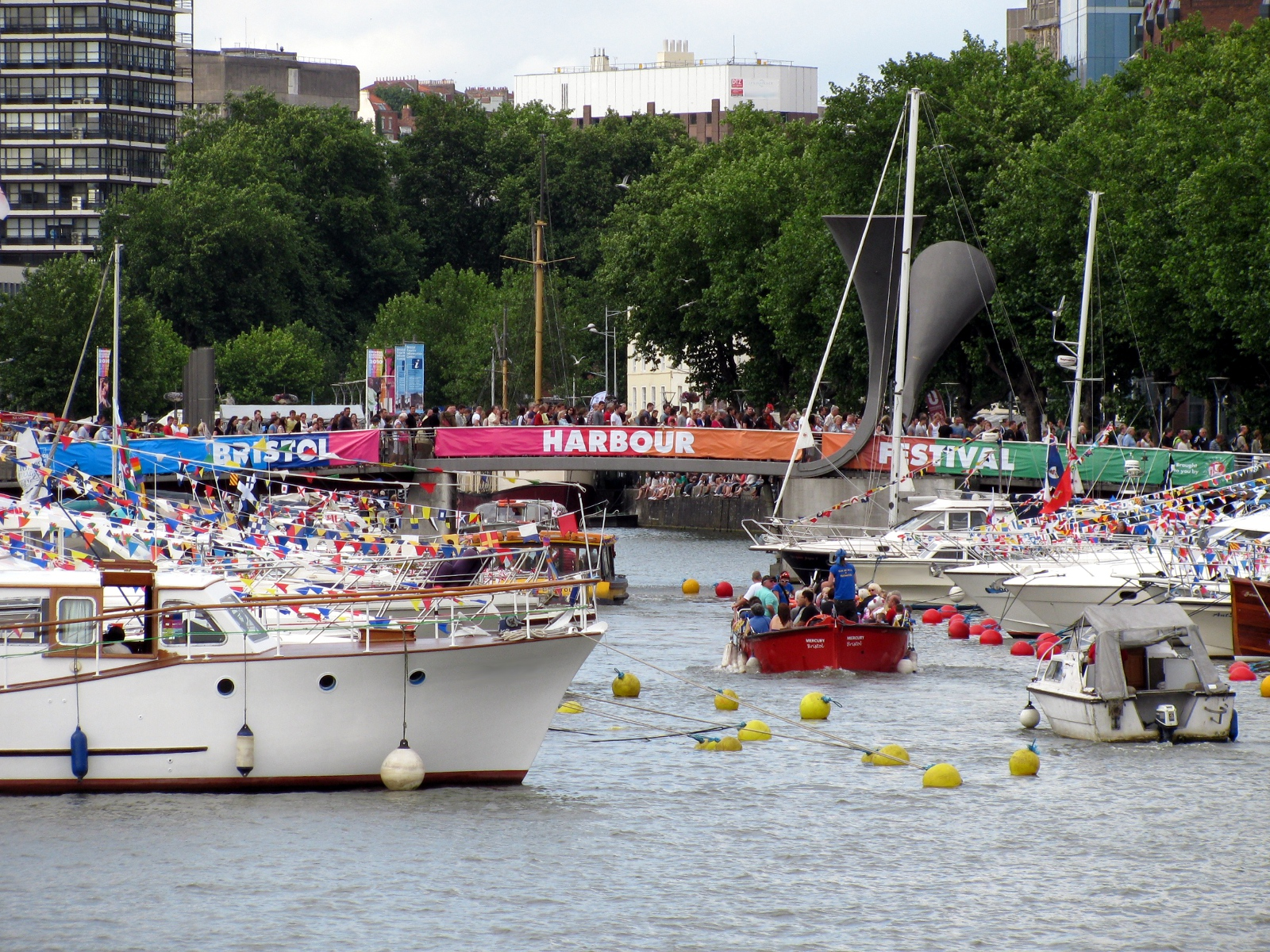
- Pero's Bridge full of people passing over the harbour at one end of the Bristol Harbour Festival in 2010.
- Genre: Music Festival, Community Festival
- Dates: 18–20 July 2014; 17–19 July 2015; 15–17 July 2016; 21–23 July 2017; 19–21 July 2024
- Locations: Bristol, England – Bristol Harbour, Queen Square, Millennium Square, Castle Park, Harbourside
- Years active: 1971–present
- Website: Bristol Harbour Festival Website

The Bristol Harbour Festival is a free festival held annually in the English city of Bristol, which celebrates the city's maritime heritage and the importance of Bristol's docks and harbour. Most of the activities, including live music, street performances, fireworks and a variety of other live entertainments, are held on or near the waterfront of Bristol Harbour. Venues include Queen Square, Lloyds Amphitheatre, Millennium Square and Castle Park, with seagoing vessels moored nearby.

== History ==
The city has hosted the festival since 1971, when it was started as part of an attempt to save the docks from being filled in. In 2012, the festival attracted over 300,000 visitors, its highest attendance, with the Irene and the Matthew two of the tall ships to attend that year. In 2013 fireworks returned to the festival after a two-year hiatus.

== Entertainment ==
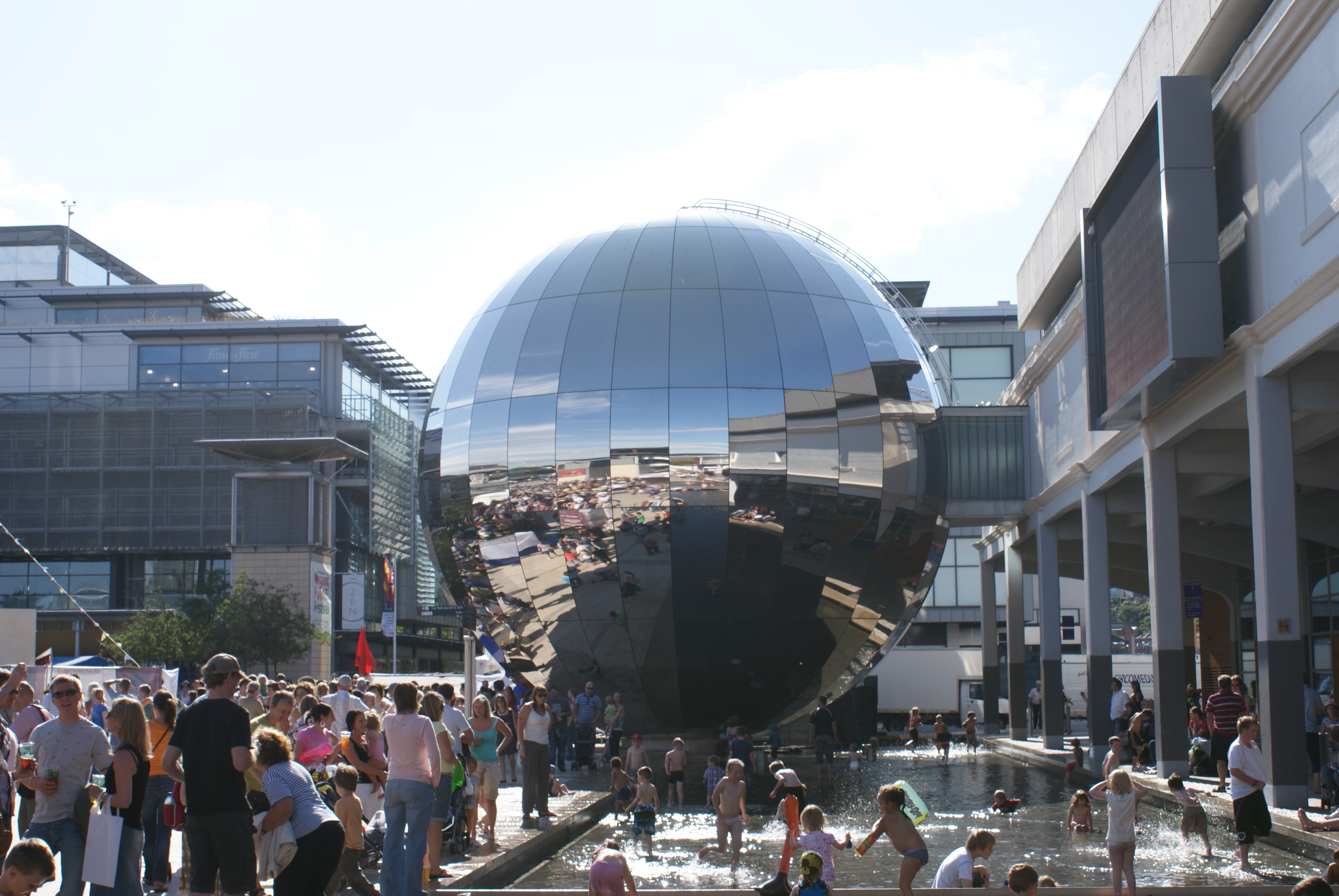
The We The Curious planetarium (a large stainless-steel sphere), and people in Millennium Square during the 2008 festival.

The festival has a variety of entertainment including dance acts, interactive theatre, international circus acts and a mix of musicians. The Dance Village, programmed by Swindon Dance, includes a main stage and participation area where visitors can learn to dance. Cirque Bijou's circus stage takes over Castle Park, next to an interactive children's area, which included a pirate ship in 2013. SS Great Britain hosts an outdoor stage with BBC Radio Bristol, while Happy City has an interactive area within Lloyds Amphitheatre. In 2013 the Thekla Harbour Stage was created in Muddock for up and coming bands alongside a new festival bandstand.

In previous years entertainment has included Beth Rowley, the Hot 8 Brass Band, DJ Derek, The Blessing, The Bristol Ambling Band, Phantom Limb, Kid Carpet, Natty, Barry Adamson and VV Brown.

In 2026, organisers announced changes to the festival footprint and entertainment schedule including more on the water activity and a festival fringe with local businesses invited to get involved.
