= Delacôte =

Delacôte is a surname. Notable people with the surname include:

- Goéry Delacôte, French theoretical physicist and science educator.
- Jacques Delacôte (born 1942), French conductor
