= Exploradôme =

Science museum in Val-de-Marne, France

Coordinates: 48°52′45″N 2°15′37″E

The Exploradôme is a science museum located in Vitry-sur-Seine in the Val-de-Marne, France. It was founded by Goéry Delacôte. It is open daily; an admission fee is charged.

The museum opened in 1998. Its permanent exhibition contains interactive objects designed and produced by the Exploratorium in San Francisco, including optical illusions, turbulent motion, structures and forms, and movement. The museum also contains temporary exhibits, and provides workshops for children and teenagers.

== See also ==
- List of museums in Paris
