= Keith Newstead =

English automata maker (1956–2020)

Keith Newstead (4 March 1956 - 8 November 2020) was an English automata maker. He was considered one of the most pre-eminent makers of automata in the United Kingdom.

His work was exhibited globally, including the Exploratorium, the Eden Project, and the Tokyo Toy Museum.
