= Exploratory =

Exploratory may refer to:

- Exploration, the act of searching or traveling by land, sea, air or space for the purpose of discovery of resources or information
- Exploratory committee, in United States politics, an organization that tests the feasibility of a potential candidate running for an elected office
- Exploratory data analysis, an approach to analyzing data for the purpose of formulating hypotheses worth testing
- Exploratory engineering, the process of making models of systems that are not feasible with current technologies
- Exploratory (museum), a hands-on science museum in Bristol, England, from 1987 to 1999
- Exploratory research, a type of research conducted for a problem that has not been clearly defined
- Exploratory search a specialization of information exploration used by searchers who have difficulties with the domain or achieving their goal
- Exploratory surgery, a surgery performed to find a diagnosis for an ailment, improvements in imaging technology have reduced their usage
- Exploratory testing, an approach to software testing that is concisely described as simultaneous learning, test design and test execution
- Space Solar Power Exploratory Research and Technology program, research conducted on the feasibility of solar power beamed from space
