= Bristol Schools Philharmonia =

Bristol Schools Philharmonia is an orchestra run by Bristol City Council for young musicians of a high standard who attend schools in the Bristol area.

It is currently directed by Ian Holmes, who has conducted the orchestra since 2013. Ian Holmes is director of the Centre for Performing Arts at the University of the West of England. He is a conductor, performer and teacher, who has been the conductor of the Parc and Dare Band (winner of the BBC Radio Wales Band of the Year 1995); principal tuba of the London Brass Virtuosi and Musical Director of the City of Hull Youth Symphony Orchestra.

Mark Finch conducted the orchestra from 2005 to 2013.

They perform concerts once per school term at the Victoria Rooms in Bristol.
