= Walter Kitundu =

Walter Jesse Kitundu
- Born: July 3, 1973 (age 52); Rochester, Minnesota, U.S.
- Occupations: Musical instrument builder, graphic artist, musical composer
- Awards: MacArthur fellowship (2008)
- Website: www.kitundu.com

Walter Jesse Kitundu (born July 3, 1973) is a musical instrument builder, graphic artist, and musical composer from San Francisco, California.

== Biography ==
Kitundu was born in Rochester, Minnesota and spent his early years in Tanzania. He returned to Minnesota from age 8 to 25, then moved to the San Francisco Bay Area in approximately 1998. He currently lives in Chicago.

== Career and Works ==
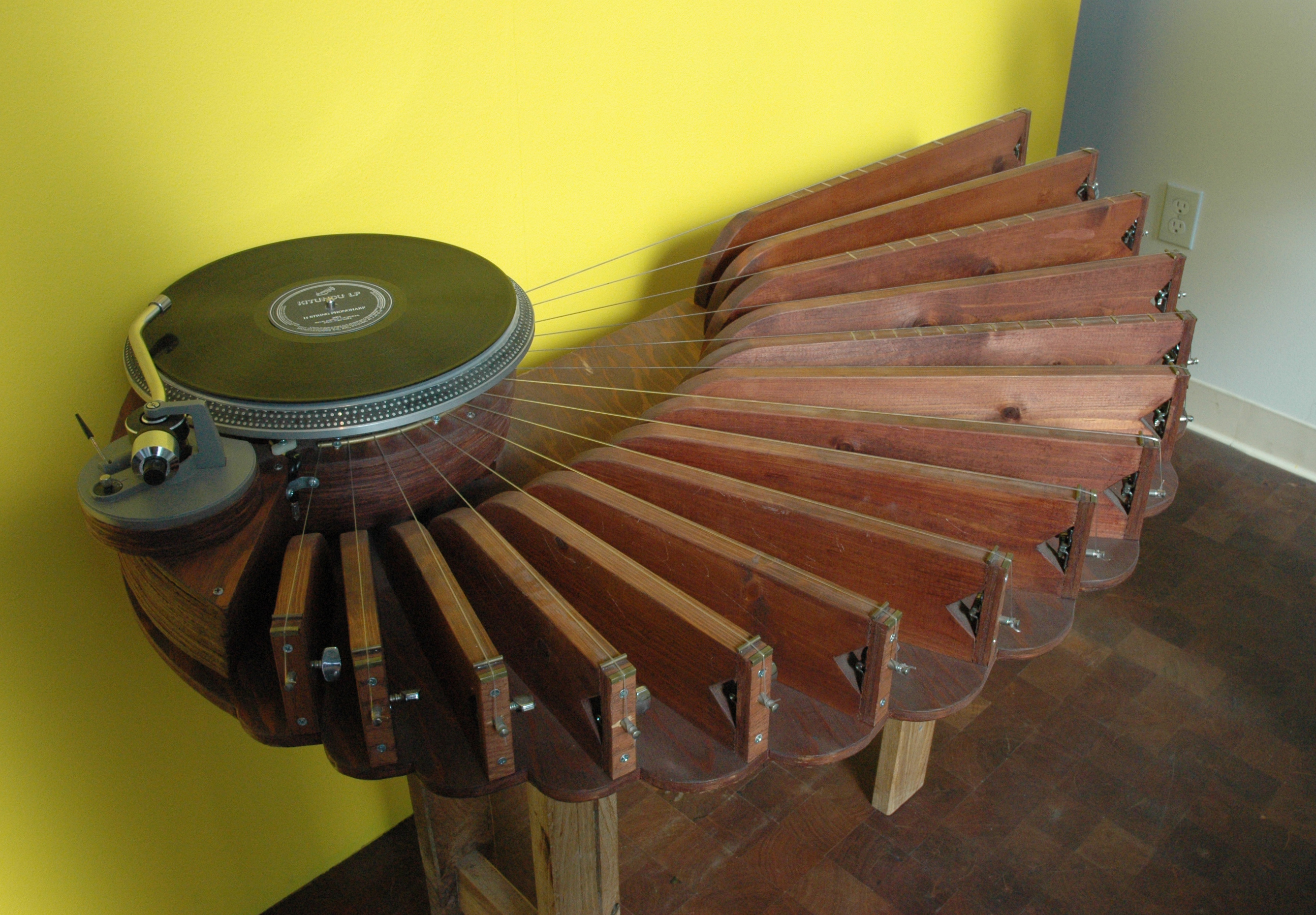
Phonoharp on exhibit at the Museum of Craft and Folk Art in San Francisco

Described as a renaissance man, Kitundu is inventor of the "phonoharp", a stringed instrument incorporating a phonograph. After hearing the instrument, the Kronos Quartet hired Kitundu as their "instrument builder in residence". In addition to a phonoharp he also built a "phonoharp" for each of the quartet's members. For the song "Tèw semagn hagèré" on their 2009 album Floodplain, he created new instruments inspired by the begena, an Ethiopian 10-string lyre.

As of 2008 Kitundu is a "Multimedia Artist" with the Exploratorium, artist in residence at the Headlands Center for the Arts, and a Distinguished visiting professor of "Wood Arts" at the California College of the Arts.

Kitundu is also a wildlife photographer, with a specialty in hawks and other raptors.

== Awards ==
In September 2008, Kitundu won a MacArthur fellowship.
