= Engineers House =

Building in Clifton Down, Bristol, England

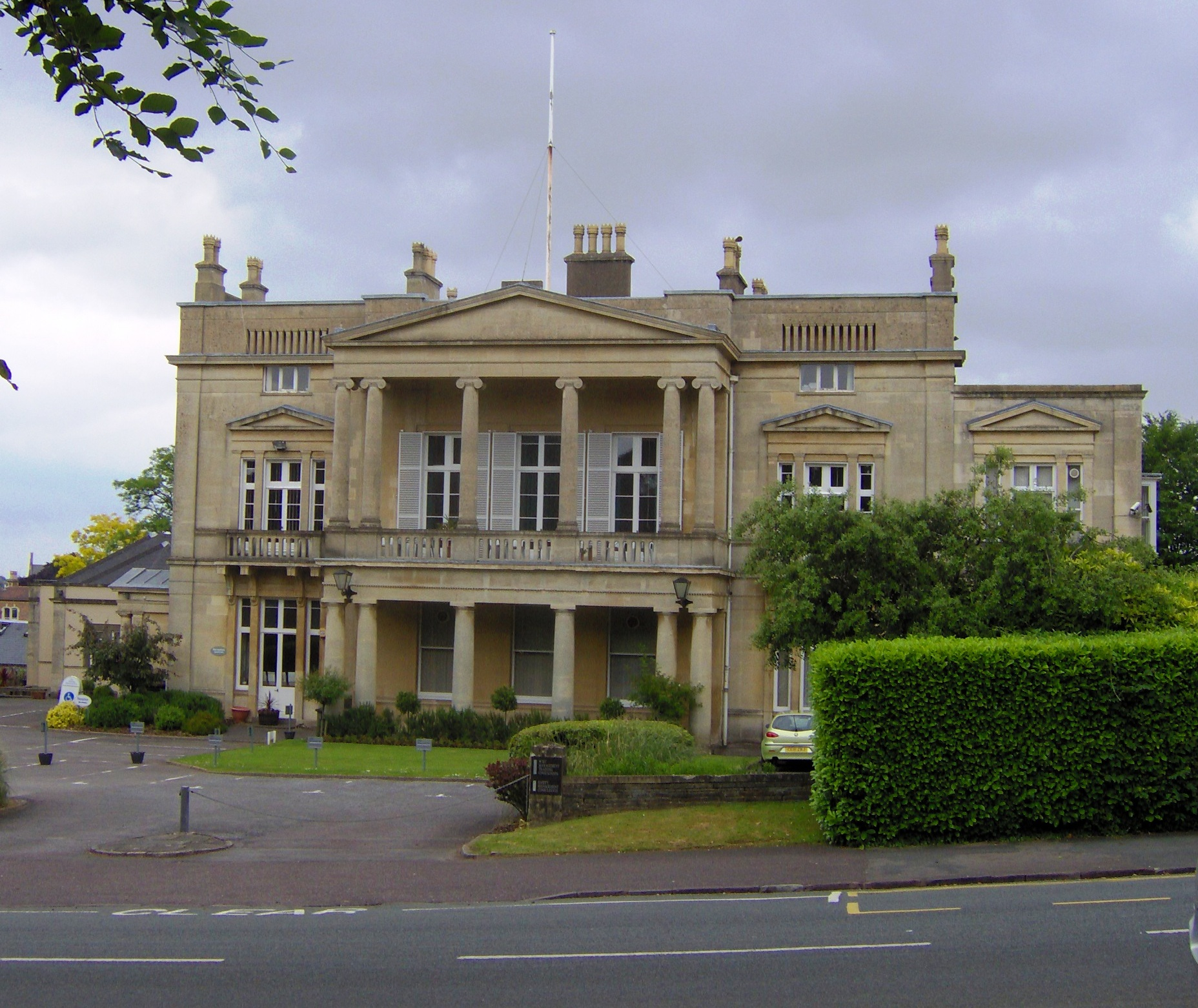

- Location within Bristol
- Former names: Camp House

General information
- Architectural style: Neoclassical
- Location: The Promenade, Clifton Down, Bristol, England
- Coordinates: 51.458560°N 2.625938°W
- Completed: 1831; 195 years ago
- Client: Charles Pinney

Design and construction
- Architect: Charles Dyer

Listed Building – Grade II*
- Official name: Engineer's House
- Designated: 8 January 1959
- Reference no.: 1282070

The Engineers House is a historic building, previously known as Camp House, on The Promenade, Clifton Down, Bristol, England. It has been designated as a Grade II* listed building.

It was built in 1831 by Charles Dyer for Charles Pinney, who became mayor of Bristol, serving during the Reform Bill riots of 1831.

== Architecture ==
The neoclassical two-storey limestone building has a symmetrical front in the centre of which is a pedimented portico with tuscan on ionic columns with a balcony above.

== Early residents ==
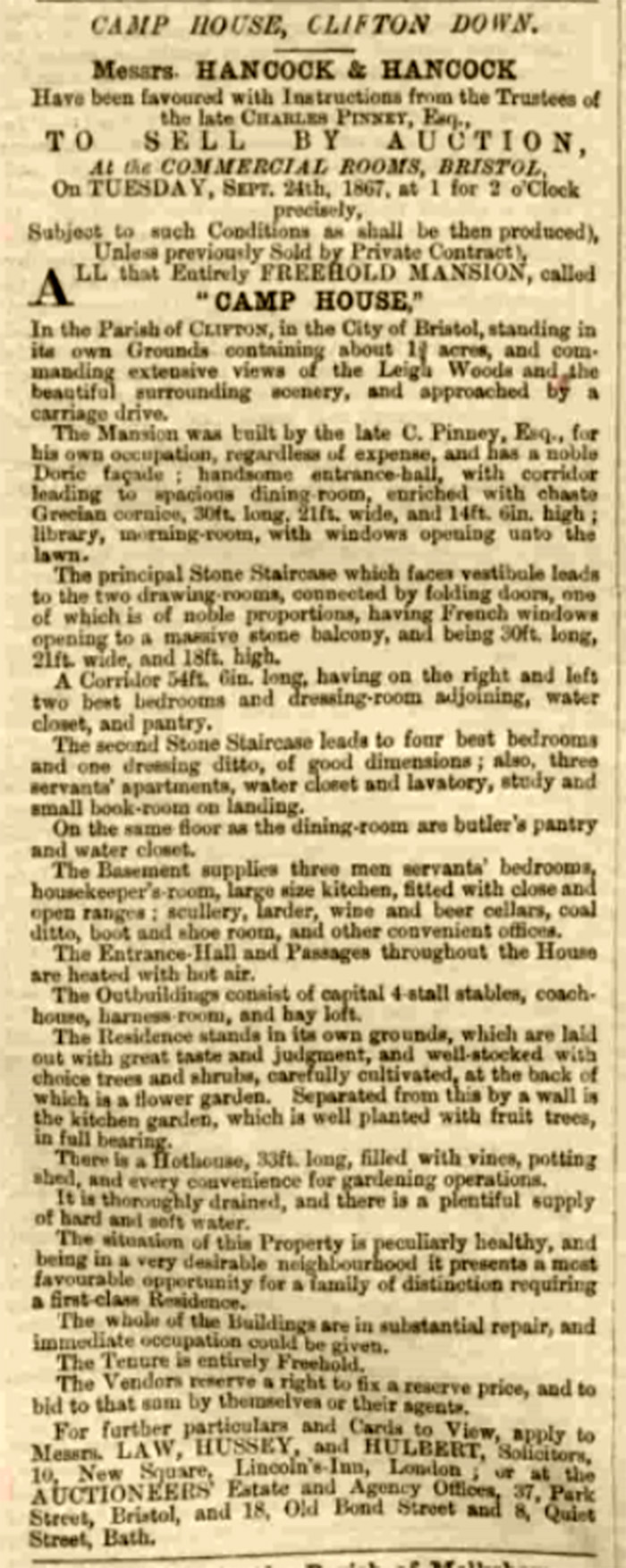
Sale ad 1867

Charles Pinney (1793–1867) commissioned Camp House (later called Engineers House) in 1831 shortly after his marriage. He was born in 1793 in Clifton, Bristol. His father was John Preter who had adopted the name Pinney when he inherited their numerous estates. Charles became a merchant and in 1831 was elected as Mayor of Bristol. He held this office during the riots caused by the rejection of the Reform Bill in the House of Commons.

In 1830 he married Frances Mary, fourth daughter of John Still of Knoyle, Wiltshire. The couple had two sons and one daughter. They lived at Engineers House for the rest of their lives. Frances died in 1860 and Charles in 1867. After his death the property was advertised for sale. The advertisement is shown. The house was purchased by Richard Drake and sold five years later in 1872 to Henry Thomas Bridges.

Henry Thomas Bridges (1802–1882) was a West India merchant and landowner. He was born in 1803 in Devon. His father was Captain Richard Bridges of the Royal Navy. In 1837 he married Clara Greenly Coulson who was the daughter of John Colston Coulson, solicitor of Clifton Wood, Bristol. The couple had three sons and two daughters. The 1881 Census records the family living at Engineers House with several members of their family, a butler, a footman, a housekeeper, a lady's maid, two house maids, a kitchen maid and a child's maid. Henry died in 1882 and the house was sold the following year.

In the 1890s the house became a high class finishing school for girls. Miss Selina Ann Evans (1840–1903) was the headmistress. After she died in 1903 Ernest Charles Philp became the owner of the house.

== Later residents ==
Ernest Charles Philp (1856–1939) lived with his family in the house for the next thirty five years. He was the Chairman of Messrs Rowe Brothers and Co which was a manufacturer of lead ware, brass taps and other kitchen and bathroom products.

Their factory called Rowes Leadworks in Anchor Square Bristol still exists today. His wife was Emma Jane Rowe (1856–1927), the daughter of Thomas Rowe, a director of the leadworks company. The couple had two sons and a daughter. After Ernest died in 1939 the house was sold. By 1949 the house had been acquired by Richard Ramsey Garden, an ophthalmic surgeon who practiced in Bristol. He died in 1966.

It is now used as offices, a training centre and a conference venue. In 2015 it achieved a green charter mark for the way in which energy and waste are managed to reduce the carbon footprint of the building.

== See also ==
- Grade II* listed buildings in Bristol
