= Charles Dyer (architect) =

English architect (1794–1848)

- Born: 1794; Bristol, England
- Died: 29 January 1848 (aged 53–54)
- Occupation: Architect

Charles Dyer (1794 in Bristol – 29 January 1848) was an architect based in London who designed many buildings in and around Bristol.

== Some buildings of Charles Dyer ==
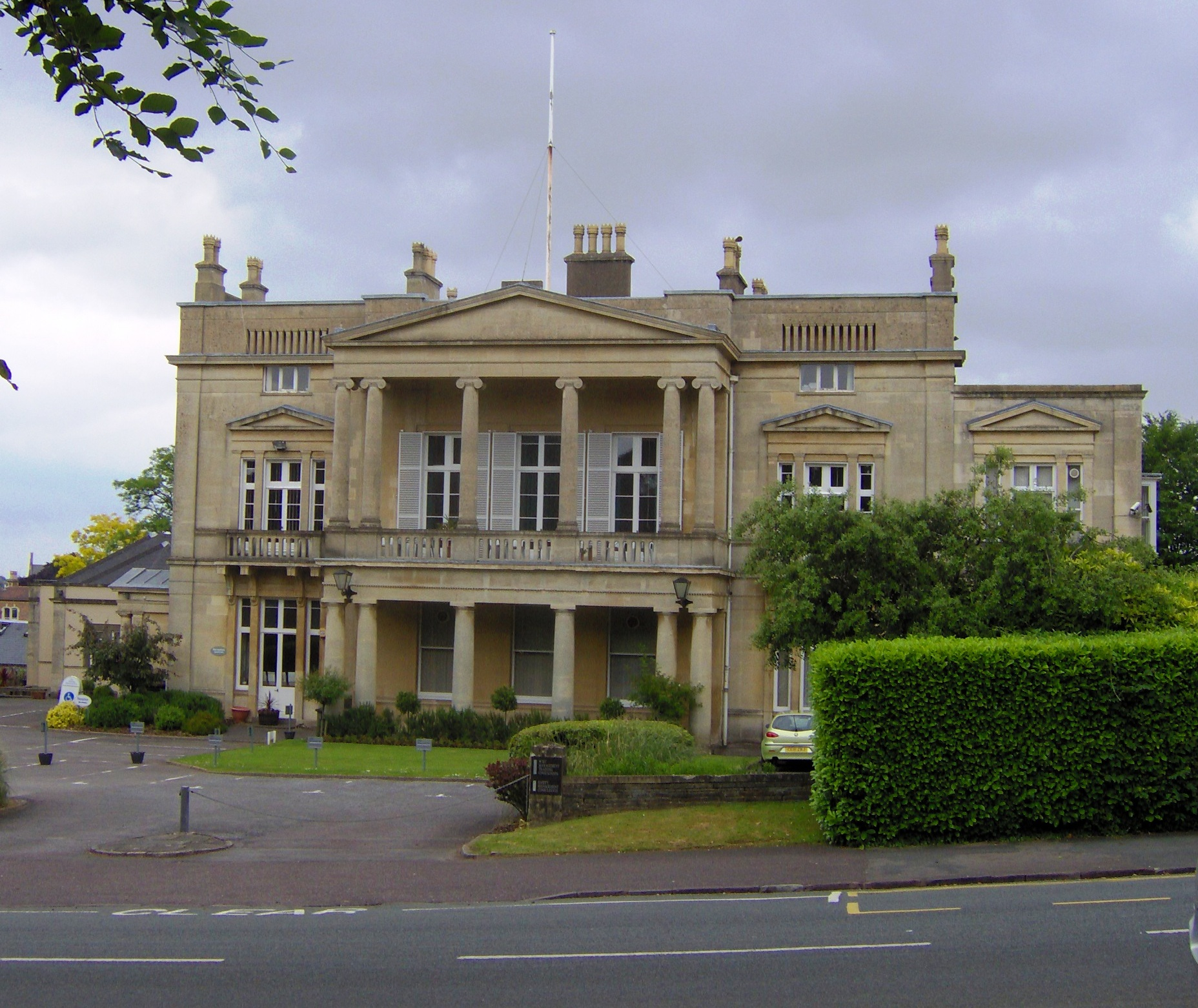
Engineers House, Bristol

- St Pauls' Church, Bedminster (1829–1831)
- Engineers House, Bristol 1831
- The Lodge, Lyegrove House, Old Sodbury (1835)
- The Bishops' College and Chapel, Bristol (1835–1839)
- Dyers' Hall, London (1839–1840)
- The Victoria Rooms, Bristol (1839–1841)
- Christ Church, Clifton Down, Bristol (1841)
