= Iron Science Teacher =

- Genre: Live Webcast
- Country of origin: United States
- Original language: English

Production
- Running time: approx. 1 hour

Original release
- Network: Exploratorium
- Release: 1998 – present

The Iron Science Teacher is a national competition that celebrates innovation and creativity in science teaching. The competition originated at the Exploratorium in San Francisco. Parodying the cult Japanese TV program, “Iron Chef,” this competition showcases science teachers as they devise classroom activities using a particular ingredient — an everyday item such as a plastic bag, milk carton, or nail. Contestants are currently or formally part of the Exploratorium's Teacher Institute and compete before a live audience for the title of "Iron Science Teacher." Shows are also archived on the Exploratorium's site.

Astrophysicist Linda Shore, Director of the Exploratorium Teacher Institute and original host of the competition, says one goal of the Iron Science Teacher is to "provide teachers with ideas about how to teach multimillion dollar state and national science teaching standards using, trash, recyclables, and inexpensive materials" as well as "to allow teachers to receive applause for great teaching."

== History ==
Back in 1997, the Exploratorium's Phyllis C. Wattis Webcast Studio was looking for new shows. During a staff brainstorming session, a fan of the popular Food Network television show, The Iron Chef, suggested naming a secret ingredient for science teachers to use in an experiment to present to the audience. "It was honestly and truly a joke," Shore says. "We thought we'd do one show."

== Current Shows ==
Now 10 to 12 shows are produced annually for the Exploratorium's website. "Secret" ingredients, which are revealed in advance to participants so they can practice, have included everything from ordinary baking soda and food coloring to Marshmallow Peeps and pantyhose.

Shows are hosted by Jessica Parker, the Director of Teaching and Learning at the Exploratorium, and are broadcast live on Facebook.

Iron Science Teacher episodes were not produced in 2020.

== List of Previous Secret Ingredients ==
Previous secret ingredients include: (2019) birthday party supplies, gold; (2018) string, bags, balloons, “2018 teaser”; (2017) packing materials, duct tape; (2016) plastic bottles, PVC pipe, compressed air; (2015) air, plastic bottles, light bulbs; (2014) breakfast foods; dinner ingredients, lunch ingredients; (2013) PVC pipe, sea water; (2012) natural elements, domes, things found around the lagoon, Exploratorium paper products; (2011) chalk (Members Night Edition), eggs, magnets; colors (2010) triangles, leaves, lightbulbs, oil redux; (2009) Frank Oppenheimer, batteries, ferrofluid, oil, nuts and bolts; (2008) bats, eye care, dental hygiene, hair care; (2007) wire, candles, paint, sugar, baseball equipment, plastic water bottles; (2006) iron; (2003) water; (2002) hot dogs; (2001) Celebrity bake-off; (2000) feminine hygiene products, soap, popsicle sticks, corks, marshmallow peeps; (1999) Chanukah candles, pumpkins, food coloring, compact discs.

You can watch episodes through 2019 here.

== Spin-offs ==
The Canadian Iron Science Teacher also parodies the popular TV series Iron Chef and is hosted by Jay Ingram of Daily Planet on Discovery Channel. Unlike the Exploratorium version, where championship comes with no tangible prize, in the Canadian version, five "finalist" teachers, with their support teams, are selected to compete in the Iron Science Teacher finals at the University of Calgary in order to win a variety of cash prizes.

Colorado Springs, CO initiated their own CoOL Iron Science Teacher Competition as part of their What If: A Festival of Creativity & Innovation on September 11, 2010.
