= Exploratory Hands-on Science Centre =

Exploratory
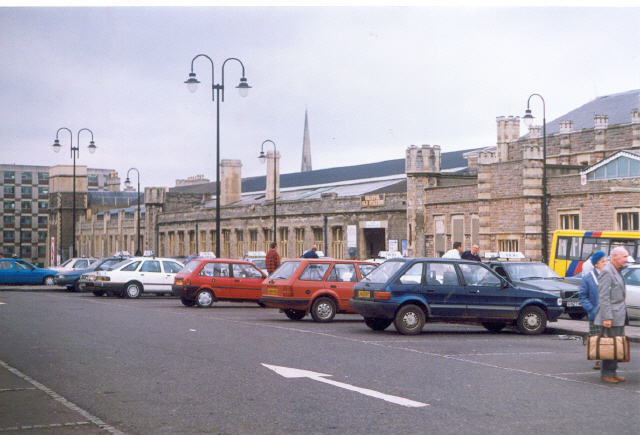
- Brunel's original Great Western station building (pictured in 1994), former home of the Exploratory

- Temple Meads, Bristol
- Established: 1987
- Dissolved: 14 September 1999
- Location: Bristol, England
- Coordinates: 51.4489°N 2.5835°W
- Type: Science museum
- Visitors: 200,000 a year
- Director: Iann Barron Executive trustee

The Exploratory Hands-on Science Centre was a science museum in Bristol, England. The project was conceived in 1981 by Richard Gregory, professor of neuropsychology at Bristol University, and was the first hands-on science museum in the United Kingdom. It was inspired by the creation of the Exploratorium in San Francisco which had opened some years earlier and which appointed him Osher Visiting Fellow in 1989. Gregory said: "As I see it 'hands-on science' is to stimulate interest in science and technology by presenting phenomena and experiments to show how things work at first hand."

== History ==
Initial funding for the idea came from the Nuffield Foundation and David Sainsbury's Gatsby Charitable Foundation. From 1987 to 1989 the interactive science exhibits were temporarily housed in the city's Victoria Rooms. In 1989 they moved to permanent installation at Bristol Temple Meads railway station. There, the expanded exhibition occupied two floors of the original terminal shed designed by Isambard Kingdom Brunel. The exhibits became known as 'plores' from the word 'explore', and the team of helpers in red sweatshirts were called 'pilots'. It was open seven days a week to the public and provided education programmes for school parties. Its footfall increased to more than 200,000 visitors a year with around 60% being children. The centre's aim of popularising science gained the active support of the TV astronomer Patrick Moore In 1993 it hosted an exhibition from the popular BBC television series Doctor Who. The space was also frequently used for broadcast of discussion shows about science for the BBC.

The Exploratory closed in September 1999 when the lease on the building expired. Its successor was At-Bristol, now We The Curious, a larger science centre which opened in 2000 at a new site as part of the regeneration of the historic Floating Harbour.

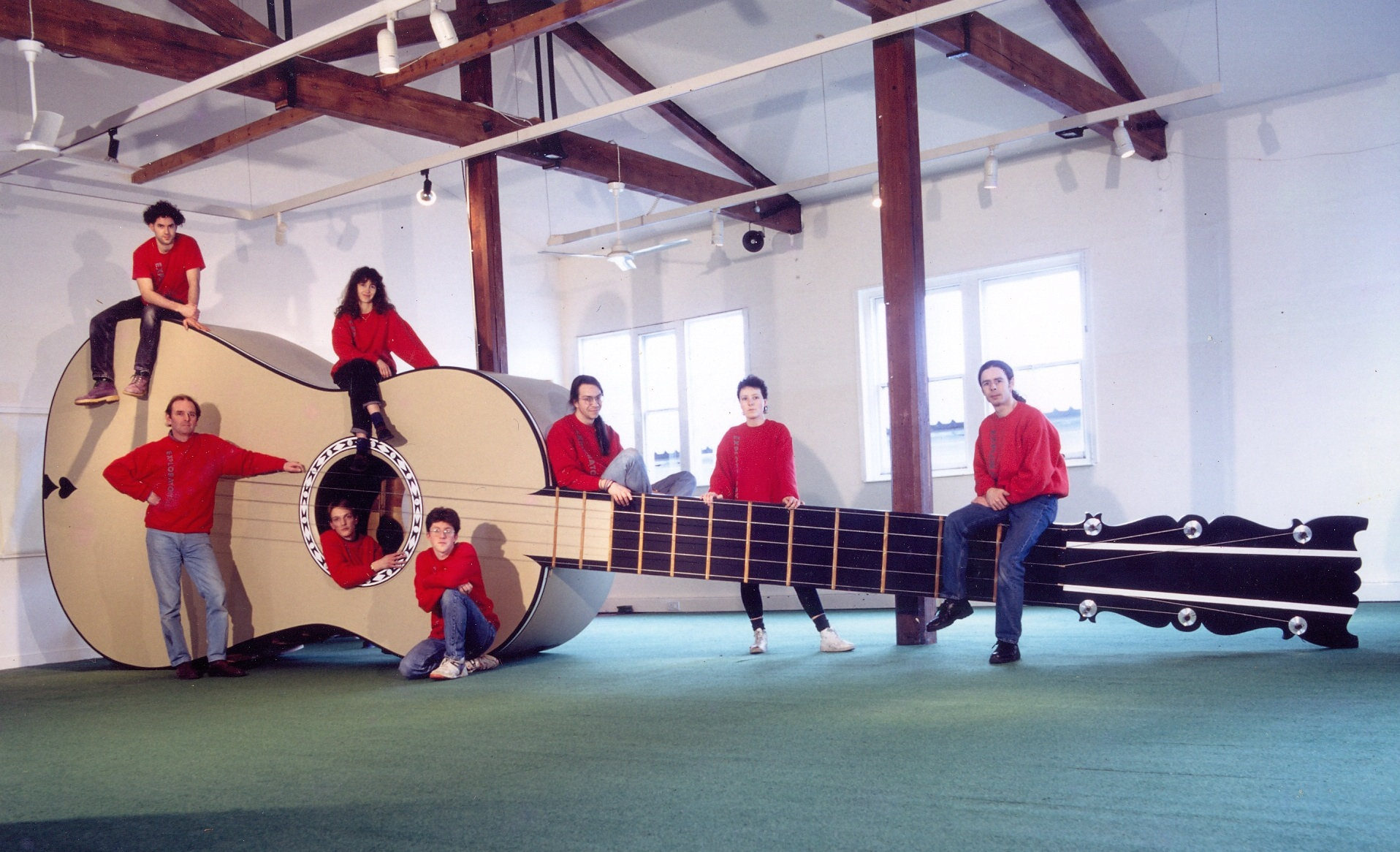
The giant guitar

One exhibit from the Exploratory, a giant Baroque guitar, was moved to the Deutsches Museum in Munich where it remains on public display. The exhibit gained a place in the Guinness World Records in 1995.

== See also ==
- List of science centers#Europe
