= We The Curious =

Science centre in Bristol, England

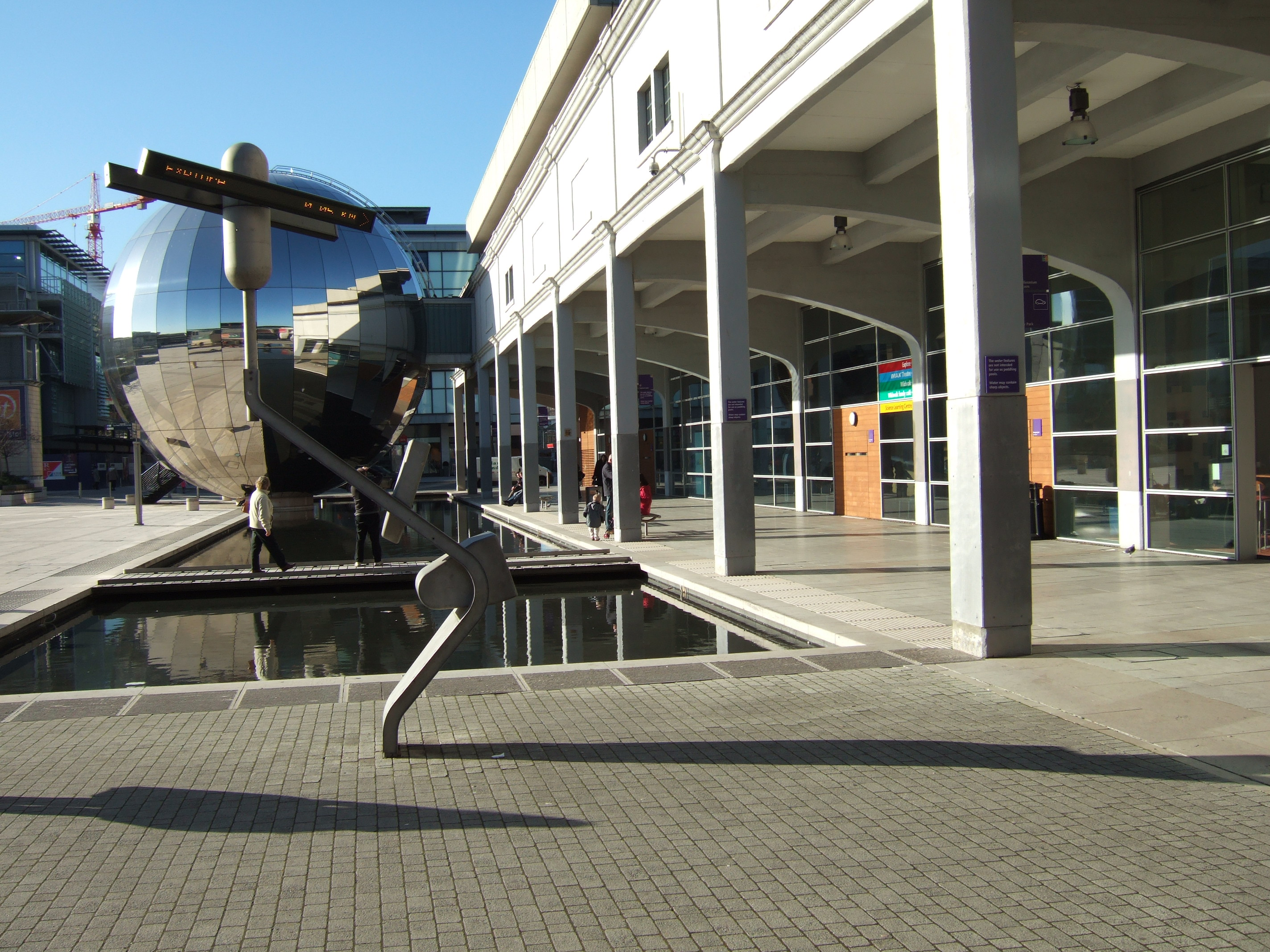
- We The Curious, showing Explore to the right, and the Planetarium, within the large stainless-steel sphere and in the foreground a Space Signpost

- Location within Bristol
- Former names: at@bristol

General information
- Type: Science Centre
- Location: Canon's Wharf, Bristol, England
- Coordinates: 51.45085°N 2.59861°W
- Opened: 2000

Website
- Official We The Curious Site

We The Curious (previously At-Bristol or "@Bristol") is a science and arts centre and educational charity in Bristol, England. It has over 200 interactive exhibits, is home to the UK’s first 3D Planetarium and hosts over 300,000 visitors a year.

Their charitable mission is "to connect and empower people through sharing creative experiences which celebrate unknowns in science".

Every year they welcome thousands of visitors to their venue on Bristol harbourside, including schoolchildren, young people, community groups and other local charities and not-for-profits. They also work with local partners and schools to offer out and about activities, work experience programmes and bespoke opportunities for individuals who wouldn't normally feel like science is for them.

The centre was closed for over two years following a fire and consequent water damage in 2022, but reopened on 2 July 2024.

== History ==
=== Background and origins ===
At-Bristol opened in 2000 as the successor to the Exploratory, a science museum and demonstration centre, founded by Richard Gregory in the former terminus train shed at Bristol Temple Meads railway station (later home to the British Empire & Commonwealth Museum). The Exploratory was a separate organisation and none of the exhibits or staff were transferred when Bristol's new museum opened in a city centre site as part of the regeneration of the historical Floating Harbour. The project was funded with £44.3 million from the National Lottery, Millennium Commission, South West of England Regional Development Agency, and a further £43.4 million from commercial partners (including a controversial donation from Nestlé) and Bristol City Council. The selection and design of exhibits were criticised by Gregory and other scientific adviser as being "totally inappropriate to the spirit of science". Goéry Delacôte was Chief Executive from 2005 until 2012.

The centre is situated on the former Canon's Wharf. Wildwalk and the IMAX cinema occupied a modified 19th century former lead-works building, and Explore occupied a 1906 railway goods shed measuring 540 by 133 ft (165 by 41 m). The goods shed was one of the first buildings to use reinforced concrete and both buildings are Grade II listed buildings. The buildings are located around Millennium Square – also part of the regeneration — and Pero's Bridge, a footbridge across the harbour which links it to the Arnolfini art gallery, Bristol Industrial Museum and Queen Square.

At its opening the centre consisted of Explore, a more traditional style hands-on science centre, which contained features on mechanics, sound and light, computer science, space and the human brain; Wildwalk, a biodiversity centre showcasing life on earth through a mix of live animals and plants, multimedia footage and exhibits and hands-on activities, including an artificial rainforest, aquariums and other ecology-related exhibits; and an IMAX theatre.

=== Closure of Wildwalk and IMAX ===
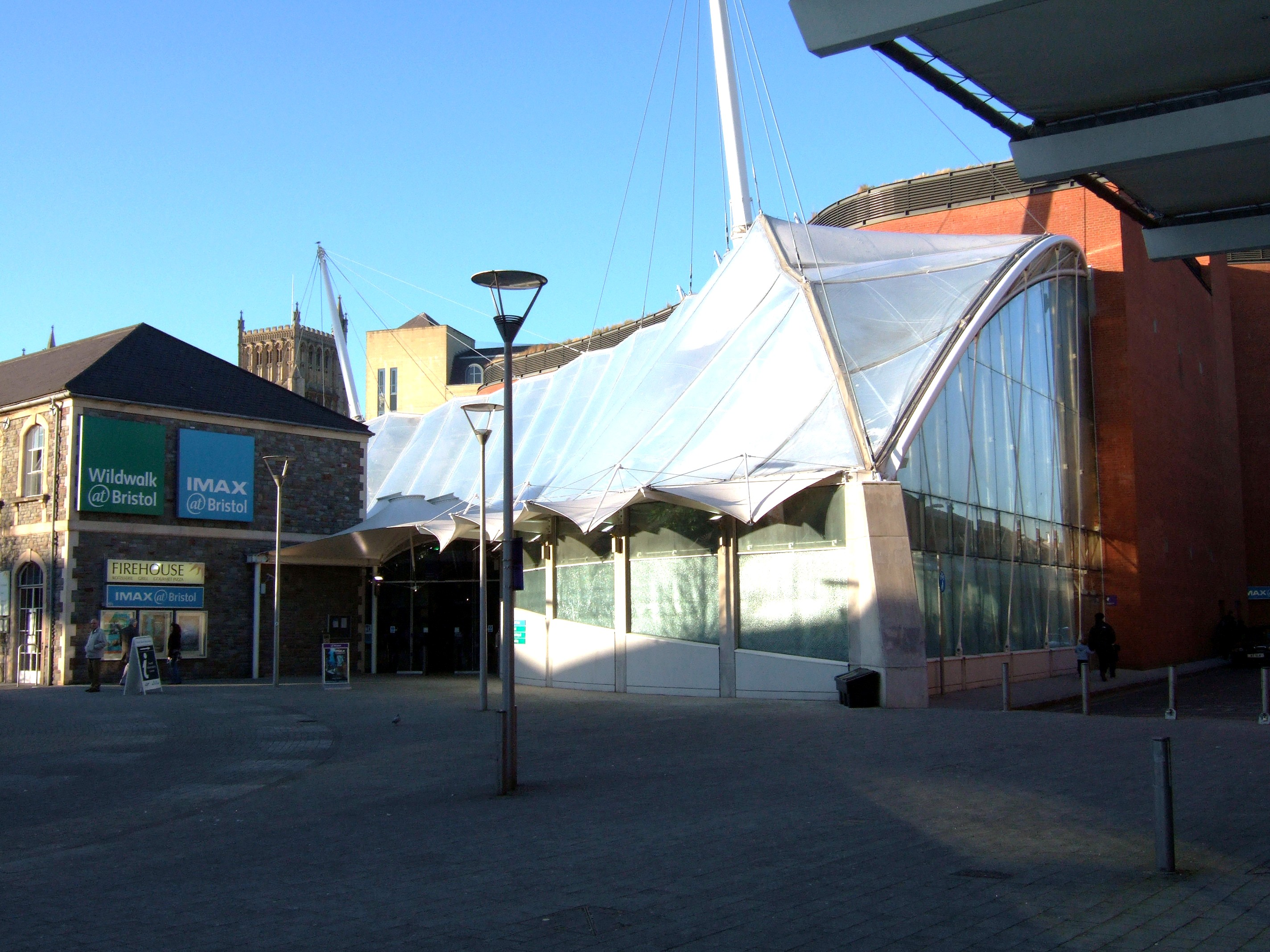
Wildwalk-At-Bristol and the IMAX Theatre from the outside. The large translucent canopy was the roof of the botanical house

Wildwalk and the IMAX Theatre closed in 2007. Despite At-Bristol's insistence that the government should have supported Wildwalk, the science centres that were established by the Millennium Commission in 2000 were intended to be self-financing once established. This proved difficult for some of the 18 centres established in 2000, with The Earth Centre, Big Idea and Wildwalk all closing within 10 years.

Though the charity had no problems securing short term funds and grants when the centre was set up, enabling them to run the three attractions for just over six years, by 2005-06 most of these had decreased or ended. This left two options: close the whole centre, or close Wildwalk and IMAX, enabling funds to be channelled exclusively to Explore. As Explore was more popular with visitors, and Wildwalk and the IMAX theatre were more expensive to run, it was decided that the second option was viable. Wildwalk and the IMAX theatre closed for the last time on 31 March 2007, making 45 people redundant.

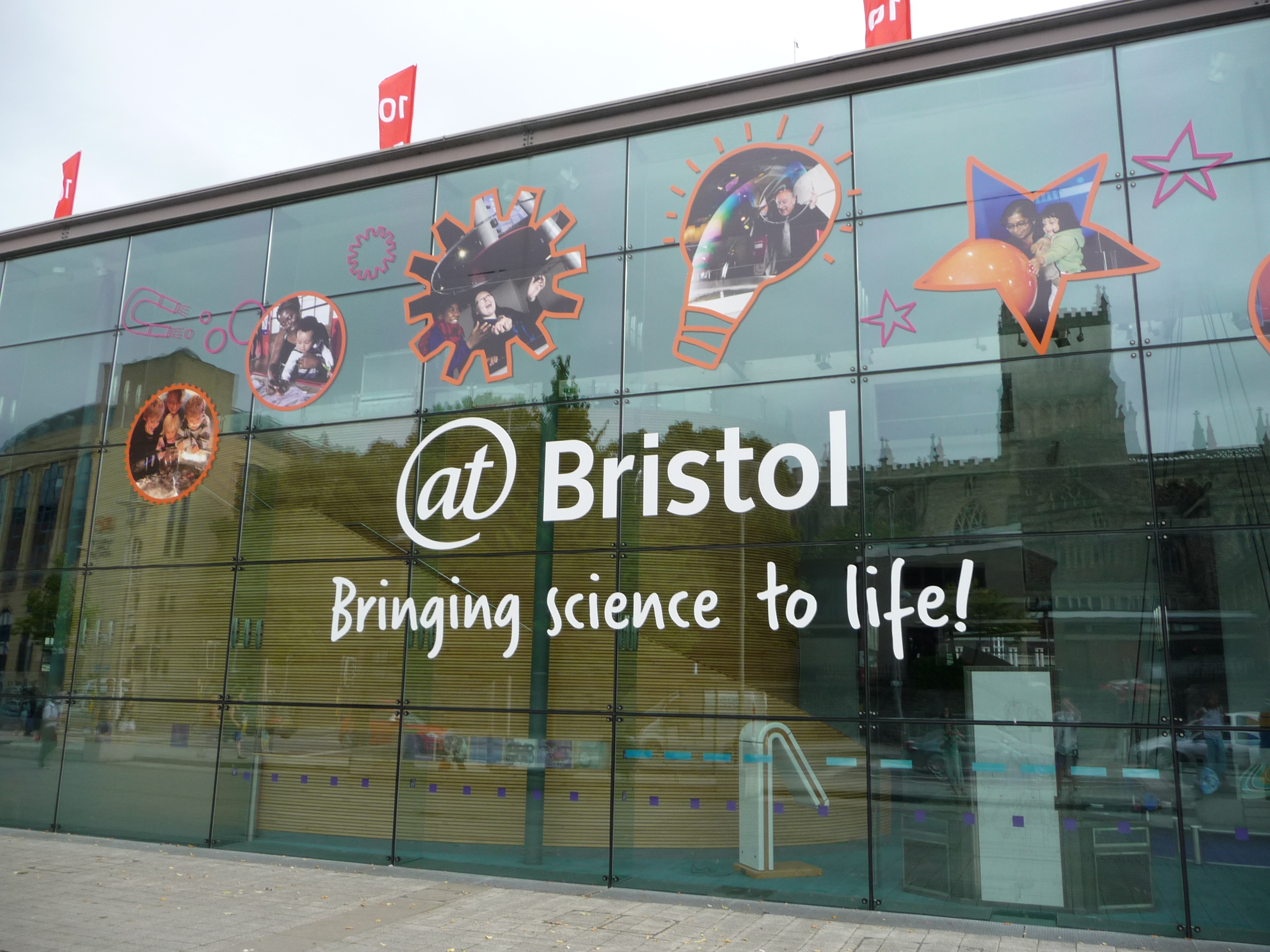
Glass wall of the building

The Regional Development Agency worked with Bristol City Council to find new uses for the buildings, with the University of the West of England expressing an interest in using them for public outreach work with schools. In 2008, Blue Reef Aquarium took on the buildings for an aquarium and events space, which opened in October 2009.

=== 2010–2017 ===
Explore rebranded to At-Bristol in June 2010. Since opening in 2000, At-Bristol had had an annual operating deficit of around £1.5 million to be filled by fundraising.

=== Rebrand as We The Curious ===
In September 2017, At-Bristol reopened as We The Curious, with a new mission to "create a culture of curiosity", in response to a consultation showing that the previous mission to "make science accessible to all" was no longer unique. Testing showed that the audience wanted the centre to be more challenging, to feature art as well as science and to be more inclusive. A new manifesto was produced in response to these themes, and the over 400 new names were considered before deciding on We The Curious. The name was tested with members, focus groups, volunteers and staff and it tested at 92% positive. We The Curious is currently working on Project What If, funded by the Wellcome Trust as part of the Inspiring Science fund along with 16 other generous funders. We The Curious is currently run by a team of over 140 part-time and full-time staff, led by Donna Speed as chief executive officer.

=== 2022 fire ===
On 9 April 2022 an electrical fire broke out of the building's roof after birds damaged a solar panel. The centre was evacuated and part of Anchor Road closed. Although the fire was extinguished within an hour, the water used for firefighting caused extensive damage to the upper floors of the building. After more than two years of repairs, the centre reopened on 2 July 2024.

== Current exhibits ==
The exhibitions are themed into various areas, some of which are permanent features, others change on a periodic basis. The ground floor of We The Curious is being re-fitted with brand new exhibits in 2020.

- The Planetarium – The UK's first 3D planetarium with seasonal, presenter-led star shows for all ages.
- The Tinkering Space – Opened in July 2016. A space on the first floor to design, create and invent with a giant ball run, a Baxter (robot), Nao (robot), 3D printers and an air table.
- Food – A kitchen and living greenhouse with exhibits about the science of food and programming spaces to have a go at making your own.
- Live Lab – An evolving lab space where visitors can experience current science including practical lab skills, research and dissections.
- All About Us – This opened in Spring 2011 and has 50 interactive exhibits which allow visitors to discover how amazing the human body is.
- Real Brain – As part of the All About Us exhibition, We The Curious has an exhibit that displays a real human brain. The exhibit has been produced to give visitors an understanding of medical science research.
- Animate It! – this exhibition was developed with Aardman Animations. Visitors can make their own animated films (2D and 3D), see a film set from Wallace & Gromit's 'A Matter of Loaf and Death', or make Morph spin in a Praxinoscope.
- Our World – Allows visitor to discover the world around us through investigation. Includes Icy Bodies, Giant Bubbles and the Turbulent Orb.
- Your Amazing Brain – The second large section on the ground floor, this area deals with the human brain, in particular optical illusions and memory.
- Studio TV (Then: Curiosity Zone) – Incorporating most of the upper level, this area deals with sound, light, force, magnets, and also includes a mock television studio.
- Space Gallery – This area includes exhibits about space travel and discovery, and the 3D Planetarium, in which 6-8 shows are given daily.
- Studio TV – a mock television studio.

We The Curious has its own exhibition workshop on site. Many of the interactive exhibits on the exhibition floor have been made by the workshop team in house, including the distinctive 'Hamster wheel' of the 'Wet Move-it' exhibition.

We The Curious is housed in a former railway goods shed, which was renovated to house the centre. The renovations included the addition of a large glass atrium to the North of the building, and stainless-steel sphere to the south, housing the planetarium. The architect behind the renovation was Chris Wilkinson.

The building includes a eutectic tank, which is a 10 metres (33 ft) high transparent tube filled with thousands of balls containing eutectic salts. As the temperature within the building rises, the crystals within the balls melt, taking in the heat and cooling the building. As the building cools, the salts crystallise again, giving out heat. In this way, the tank helps keep the temperature within the centre constant.

== Former exhibits ==
- Wildwalk - Wildwalk was an Ecology Science centre, which contained two artificial rainforests, aquariums, hands-on exhibits, and live animal exhibits. The centre comprised a large building (previously a lead-works building) with a 'living rainforest' attached to the southern side, and was designed by Michael Hopkins & Partners. The centre housed animals, including butterflies, crabs, chameleons, frogs, finches, partridges, piranhas, seahorses, scorpions, snakes, spiders, tarantulas, triggerfish: in total over 150 species from all major animal groups. The botanical house was split into two distinct sections: Plants on Land, which traced the development of plants from simple mosses through to complex flowering plants; and Tropical Forests, which showcased plants from tropical continents, including a cycad which produced a rare, bright red cone 45 cm (18 in) tall and 80 cm (31 in) in circumference in 2003. Following Wildwalks closure, all animals and plants were re-homed to other zoos and natural history venues. Some elements of the exhibits from Wildwalk have been incorporated into Explore.

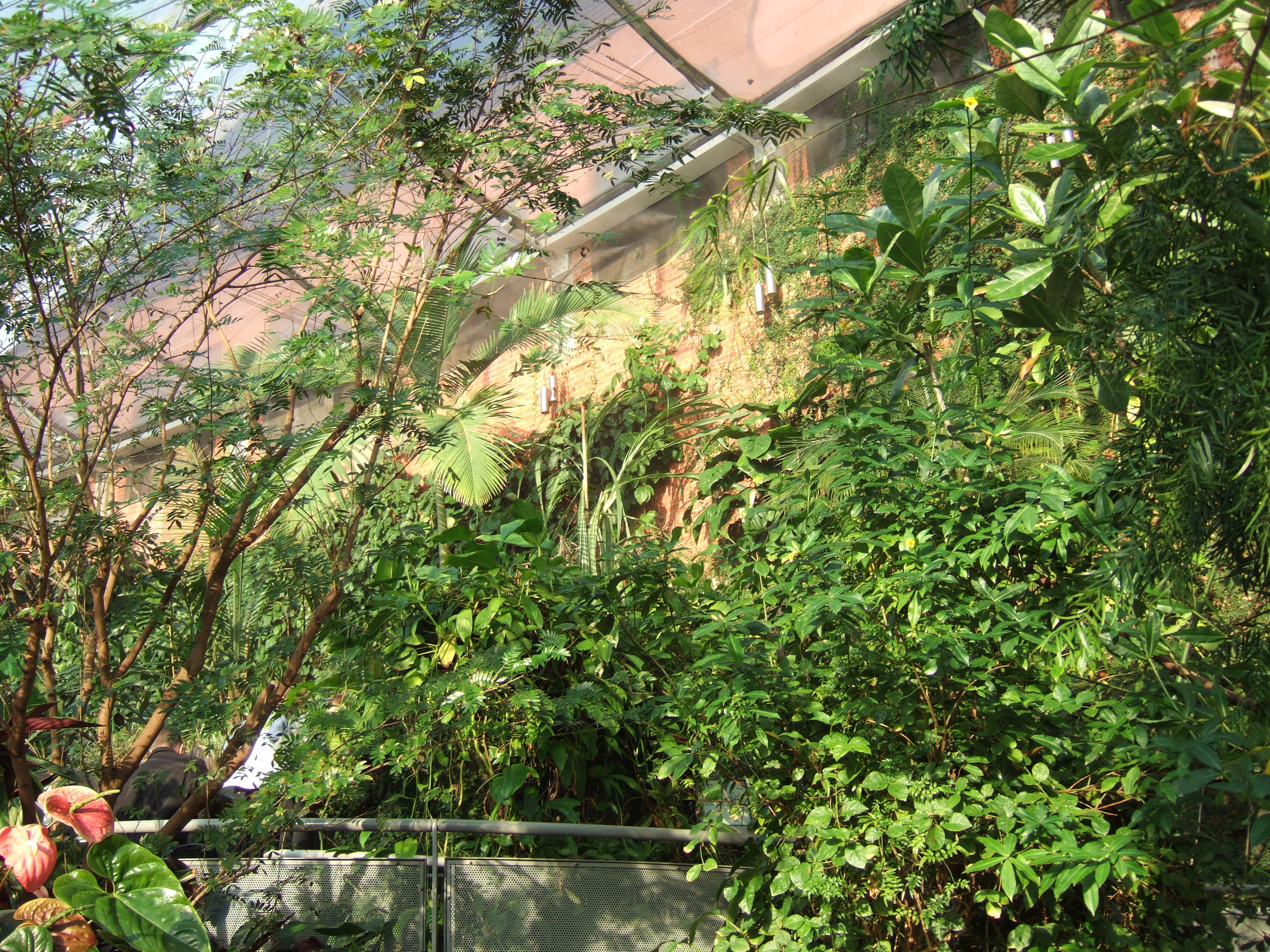
The first part of the botanical house in Wildwalk-At-Bristol; Plants on Land

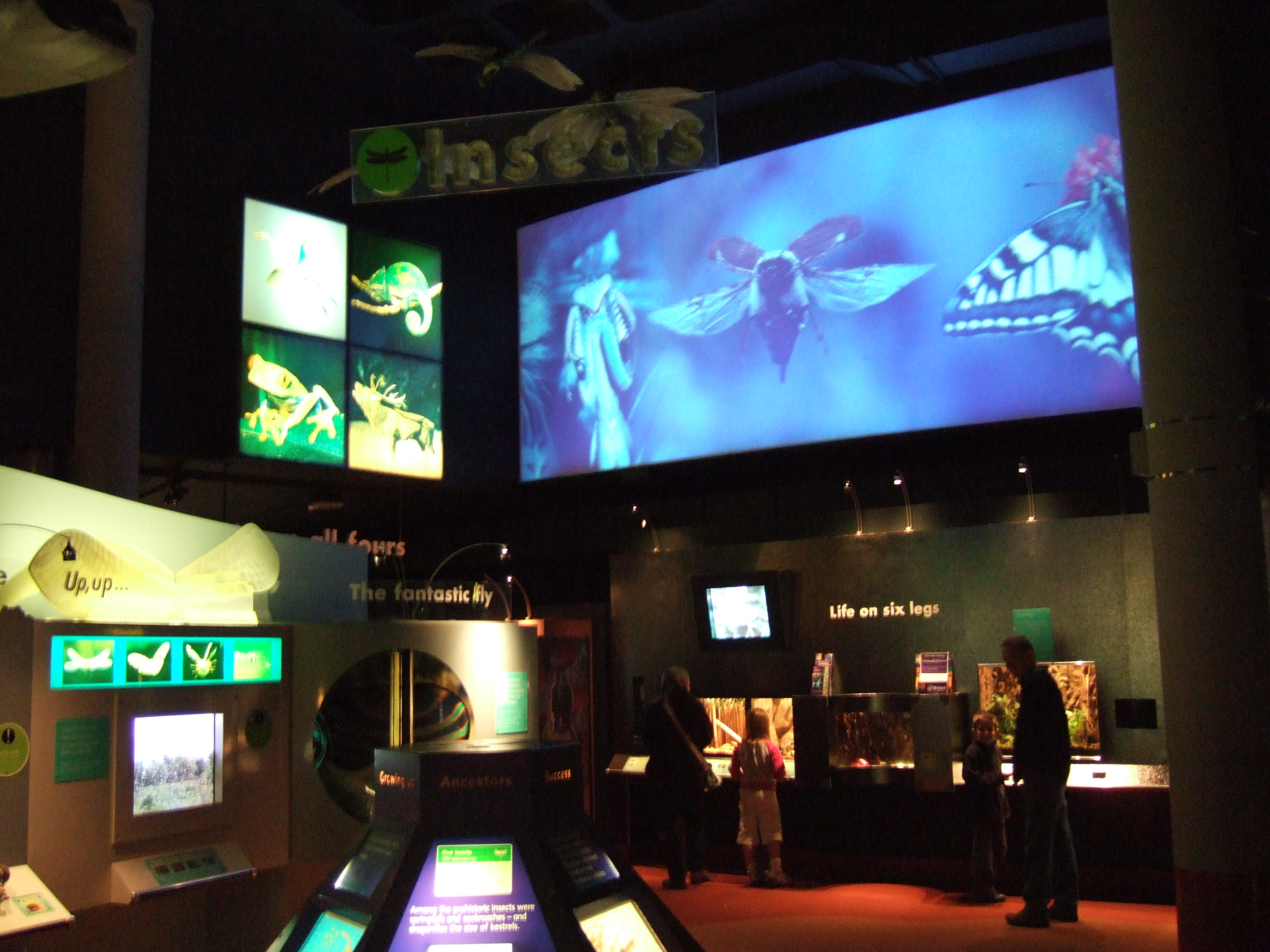
Insects; one of the exhibits in Wildwalk-At-Bristol

- IMAX – Housed in the same building as Wildwalk, the IMAX theatre was the first of the three At-Bristol attractions to open, on 20 April 2000. Since opening, the theatre received over 1.1 million visitors, and screened 70 films. The longest running film, and thus that with the highest attendance figures, was Cyberworld 3D.

== Charitable status ==
As an educational charity, We The Curious fundraises to fulfil their vision 'to create a culture of curiosity'. This work includes specific inclusion projects, outreach work to groups who are unable to visit We The Curious, and bringing hard to reach groups to We The Curious. These groups include community groups, low-income schools and hospitals. Much of this work is made possible by the work of volunteers who have been part of We The Curious since 2006 We The Curious has also recently embarked on a career ladder scheme with partnership school City Academy.

== Venue hire ==
There are rooms and roof terraces above the exhibition space that are used for private hire. These have been used by organisations such as Sky News, the BBC and FameLab as well as other conferences, meetings and events. These spaces have also been used for weddings and civil partnerships. We The Curious also hires out the exhibition floor, Planetarium, Millennium Square and Anchor Square.

== Sustainability ==
Since its inception sustainability has been a key part of the We The Curious project. The We The Curious building (formerly Explore and At-Bristol) is an example of low-energy design with a phase-change storage tank enabling air source heat pumps to heat and cool the building using only night surplus electricity.

At-Bristol (as the centre was then known) joined the 10:10 project in 2010 in a bid to reduce their carbon footprint. One year later they announced that they had reduced their carbon emissions (according to 10:10's criteria) by 12%.

Since 2010 We The Curious has been on an intense sustainability drive to improve its performance in all areas of sustainability whilst also ensuring that the subject is included in its educational and promotional work. In 2011 At-Bristol was awarded a Gold Green Tourism Award and a West of England Carbon Champions Carbon Champion Award and in 2012 a Silver South West Sustainable Tourism Award.

March 2012 also saw At-Bristol's environmental performance being improved further with the installation of a 50-kilowatt peak solar photovoltaic array to produce electricity for the building from the sun.

We The Curious presently includes "Strive for Sustainable futures" as one of the core pillars of its manifesto. The centre constantly reviews its environmental impact to try to become carbon neutral in line with the Bristol One City Plan. Partly, the centre intends to leverage its platforms to educate the public about pressing environmental concerns, such as supporting sustainable palm oil and reducing air pollution.

== IMAX 3D Cinema in 2006 and 2007 ==
- CyberWorld 3D (2006)
- IMAX Deep Sea 3D (27 January 2007)

== See also ==
- List of science centers#Europe
