= Goéry Delacôte =

French theoretical physicist and science educator

- Born: Anould
- Died: 23 February 2025
- Known for: INIST, Exploratorium, Exploradôme, At-Bristol

Academic background
- Education: École Normale Supérieure, University of Algiers
- Thesis: Doped phthalocyanine

Goéry Delacôte, Légion d'honneur, is a French theoretical physicist and science educator. He has been involved with the direction of science centres in Europe and the United States. He was instrumental in establishing the Cité des Sciences et de l'Industrie in Paris, and was head of scientific information and communication at the Centre National de la Recherche Scientifique (CNRS) for 10 years from 1982.

Delacôte founded the Exploradôme in Paris and has held prominent posts at science centres in San Francisco, California and Bristol, England.

== Biography ==
Delacôte's first name, Goéry, is possibly inspired by the founder of the commune of Épinal. The town is close to Delacôte's birthplace of Anould.

=== Education ===
At an early stage of his schooling, Delacôte skipped two grades. This encouraged his interest in physics, because he "wasn't mature enough to really appreciate the literature and poetry". He said that he became interested in physics because he considered mathematics to be too abstract, and biology to be less scientific discipline. He studied at the École Normale Supérieure (ENS), with its highly regarded physics laboratories under Pierre Aigrain. He refused to take the compulsory postgraduate teaching exam, in preference to further education and research.

There, he gained his PhD in solid-state physics, after finding it difficult to choose between condensed matter and particle/nuclear (the two dominant areas at the time). He chose organic crystals as his research area because of a desire to help less developed nations: by his reasoning, condensed matter physics was the less expensive of the two.

Delacôte helped organise a science summer school for Algerian students in 1962. He then undertook his doctoral research at the University of Algiers, in association with the ENS and later taught at Paris Diderot University. In 1969 he returned to the ENS, where he became a professor after completing his doctorate.

=== Science centres ===
Money is our oxygen. Co-operation with the private sector is guided by financial considerations, but is not limited to this dimension. It is up to the partners to express what they want and what objectives they share clearly.

— Goéry Delacôte, May 2004

Delacôte led a working group on new methods of teaching physical sciences in schools. He was approached to join Maurice Lévy's team in 1979 to help establish what was to become the Cité des Sciences et de l'Industrie. In doing so, he visited major museums in the United States. His work began as a part-time job, with him eventually becoming chief scientist there. In 1982 he was made director of scientific and technical information of the CNRS, creating the INIST in 1988. His ten-year period there included founding a new national library for research, an agency for communicating scientists' research to the public and a partnership with Google to provide free access to 13 million bibliographical references. In 1985 he became board chairman and scientific director of the Institut national de recherche pédagogique, where he remained until 1991.

Inspired by the success of San Francisco's Exploratorium, Delacôte became friends with Frank Oppenheimer. Following Oppenheimer's death in 1985, he was headhunted to the Exploratorium, becoming executive director there from 1991 until 2005. During his tenure as executive director, Dr. Delacôte worked toward extending the reach of the museum through networking—increasing outreach, expanding teacher professional development programs, creating an expanded Web presence, and supporting the formation of museum partnerships in the U.S. and abroad. He founded the Exploradôme in Paris in 1998.

From 2005 until 2012 he was Chief Executive of the At-Bristol science centre. His September 2005 move there came about for personal reasons, with his family being in London and France. In an interview in 2006, he said that he wanted to concentrate on "the quality of the exhibits and activities, and developing a network of science centres across the UK". He also said that he was disappointed with the level of English government funding for science centres, considering arrangements in Scotland and Wales to be better. His time in Bristol has been credited by the French Ambassador to the UK with giving the centre a "completely new lease of life", by assembling teams including scientists and the best exhibit designers.

In 2011 Delacôte was appointed by Cambridge Science Centre as chairman, the intention being to open a science centre in Cambridge. Upon leaving At-Bristol in 2012, he expected to return to France to develop a network of science centres similar to the Exploradôme.

== Publications ==
- Savoir Apprendre [Knowing how to learn] Paris, Odile Jacob, 1996
- Putting Science in the Hands of the Public, June 1998
- Apoptosis: the way for science centres to thrive, 2003
- Pour une économie du bien commun, 2012
- Enseigner et apprendre les sciences [Scientific education and acquisition] (contributing author), 2005
