= Exploratorium =

Museum in San Francisco, California

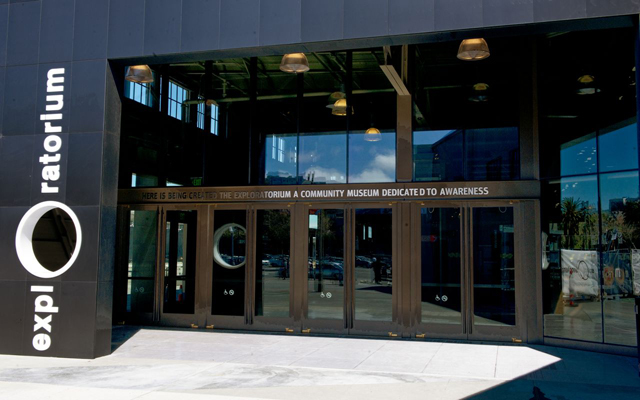
- Main entrance to the Exploratorium at Pier 15

- Location within San Francisco Location within California
- Established: 1969; relocated in 2013
- Location: San Francisco, California, United States
- Coordinates: 37.8014°N 122.3976°W
- Type: Science, art, and human perception
- Accreditation: AAM, ASTC
- Visitors: ~1 million (2014)
- Director: Lindsay Bierman
- Public transit access: The Embarcadero and Green station on the F Market & Wharves streetcar line; several other routes within walking distance
- Website: exploratorium.edu

The Exploratorium is a museum of science, technology, and arts in San Francisco, California. Founded by physicist and educator Frank Oppenheimer in 1969, the museum was originally in the Palace of Fine Arts where it founded Pi Day in 1988. The museum relocated in 2013 to Piers 15 and 17 on San Francisco's waterfront.

The museum has over 1,000 participatory exhibits divided into several galleries, mainly separated by content. Since its inception, the Exploratorium has expanded into other domains and has inspired more museums to adopt hands-on learning-by-doing exhibits.

== History ==
=== Founding and early years ===
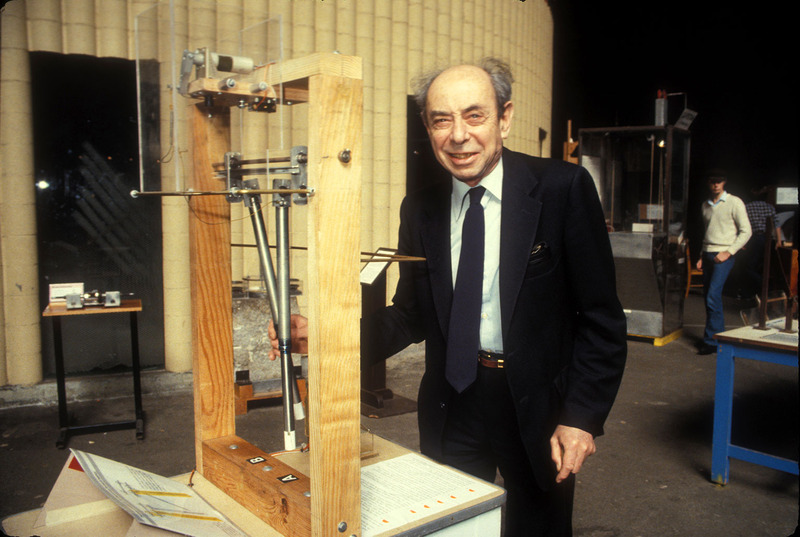
Frank Oppenheimer, founder of the Exploratorium

The Exploratorium was conceived by Frank Oppenheimer, an experimental physicist and university professor. Oppenheimer, who worked on the Manhattan Project with his brother J. Robert Oppenheimer, was diverted from an academic career when he was forced to resign from his position at the University of Minnesota in 1949 as a result of an inquiry by the House Un-American Activities Committee. He was blacklisted from academic positions across the country and withdrew with his family to run a Colorado cattle ranch for almost a decade.

Oppenheimer also began assisting local high school students with their science projects, eventually becoming the only science teacher at the high school in Pagosa Springs, Colorado. The field trips and experiments he did with his high school students would become a blueprint for the hands-on methods of teaching and learning he would later bring to the Exploratorium.

When Oppenheimer was invited to join the University of Colorado's physics department in 1959, he found himself less interested in traditional laboratory research and much more interested in exploring methods of provoking curiosity and inquiry. He received a grant from the National Science Foundation, which he used to build models of nearly a hundred scientific experiments. This "Library of Experiments" would become the core of the Exploratorium's exhibit collection and was the forerunner of the Exploratorium Cookbook, a manual explaining how to build these basic science exhibits.

Convinced of the need for public museums to supplement science curricula at all levels, he toured Europe and studied museums on a Guggenheim Fellowship in 1965. Three European museums, encountered during that year, served as important influences on the founding of the Exploratorium: the Palais de la Découverte, which displayed models to teach scientific concepts and employed students as demonstrators, a practice that directly inspired the Exploratorium's much-lauded High School Explainer Program; the South Kensington Museum of Science and Art, which Oppenheimer and his wife visited frequently; and the Deutsches Museum in Munich, the world's largest science museum, which had a number of interactive displays that impressed the Oppenheimers.

Back in the United States, Oppenheimer was invited to do the initial planning for a new branch of the Smithsonian, but he eventually turned it down to work instead on what he called his "San Francisco project". In 1967, the Oppenheimers moved to San Francisco with a view towards opening an independent museum of their own. Oppenheimer sought funding and support for the endeavor using a grassroots approach, bringing a written proposal and some handmade exhibits with him as he visited scientists, businesses, city and school officials, relatives, and friends. Many prominent scientists and cultural figures endorsed the project, and the offers of support, in conjunction with a $50,000 grant from the San Francisco Foundation, made the museum realizable.

=== Palace of Fine Arts ===
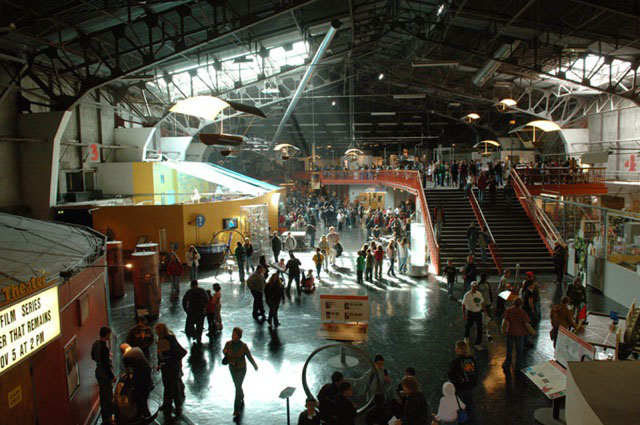
Exploratorium's main floor, in its original Palace of Fine Arts location (2009)

In late August 1969, the Exploratorium opened with little fanfare at the Palace of Fine Arts. Oppenheimer "simply opened the doors". Although the building needed many improvements, Oppenheimer couldn't afford to make the changes, and decided to allow the public to come and watch exhibits being built and changes being made as part of the participatory ethos of the institution. An early proposal would have erected a wall between the workshop where exhibits were being developed and the main visitor areas. Instead, Oppenheimer insisted that the workshop be placed without a wall, right next to the main entrance so that visitors could experience "the way a shop smells when you burn the wood in a saw, or smell the oil from a lathe". Above the workshop was a sign made by Barbara Perkins Gamow, who was the wife of George Gamow, a physicist, educator, and friend of Oppenheimer who had died just a year before the opening of the Exploratorium. "Here Is Being Created the Exploratorium a Community Museum Dedicated to Awareness" the inscription said. (Today, a copy of this motto is inscribed above the main entrance to the new Exploratorium at Pier 15.)

A medley of videos recorded at the Exploratorium's Microscope Imaging Station

Oppenheimer served as the museum’s director until his death in 1985. Dr. Robert L. White served as director from 1987 to 1990. Dr. Goéry Delacôte served as executive director from 1991 until 2005. Dr. Dennis Bartels served as executive director of the Exploratorium from 2006 to 2016. Chris Flink served as director from June 2016 through February 2022, when he was replaced by the former Chancellor of the University of North Carolina School of the Arts (UNCSA) and PBS executive, Lindsay Bierman. The museum has expanded greatly since the 1980s, increasing outreach, expanding programs for educators, creating an expanded Web presence, and forming museum partnerships around the world.

=== Move to Piers 15 and 17 ===
In April 2013, the Exploratorium relocated from the Palace of Fine Arts to Piers 15 and 17, located between the San Francisco Ferry Building and Pier 39 along the San Francisco Embarcadero. In 2004, the Piers location was identified by Goéry Delacôte and then-board chairman Van Kasper as a potential space for relocation. In 2005, the San Francisco Board of Supervisors passed a resolution exempting the museum’s lease of the piers from San Francisco’s competitive bidding process due to its unique nature as a cultural and educational institution. Groundbreaking for the project, which required substantial construction and renovation, occurred on October 19, 2010. The Exploratorium holds a 66-year lease on the piers with the Port of San Francisco. Exhibits are only viewable at the Pier 15 campus; Pier 17 houses some staff, with the option for future expansion.

Piers 15 and 17 are historic piers that were constructed in 1931 and 1912, respectively. In 1954, the area between the piers was infilled and paved over. This infill was removed as part of the construction phase, restoring the space between the piers to public plazas, a pedestrian bridge, and open water.

=== Expansion since ===
In 2026, the Exploratorium announced plans to expand with a location in Seoul, South Korea.

== Architecture and design ==
=== Renovation of Piers 15 and 17 ===
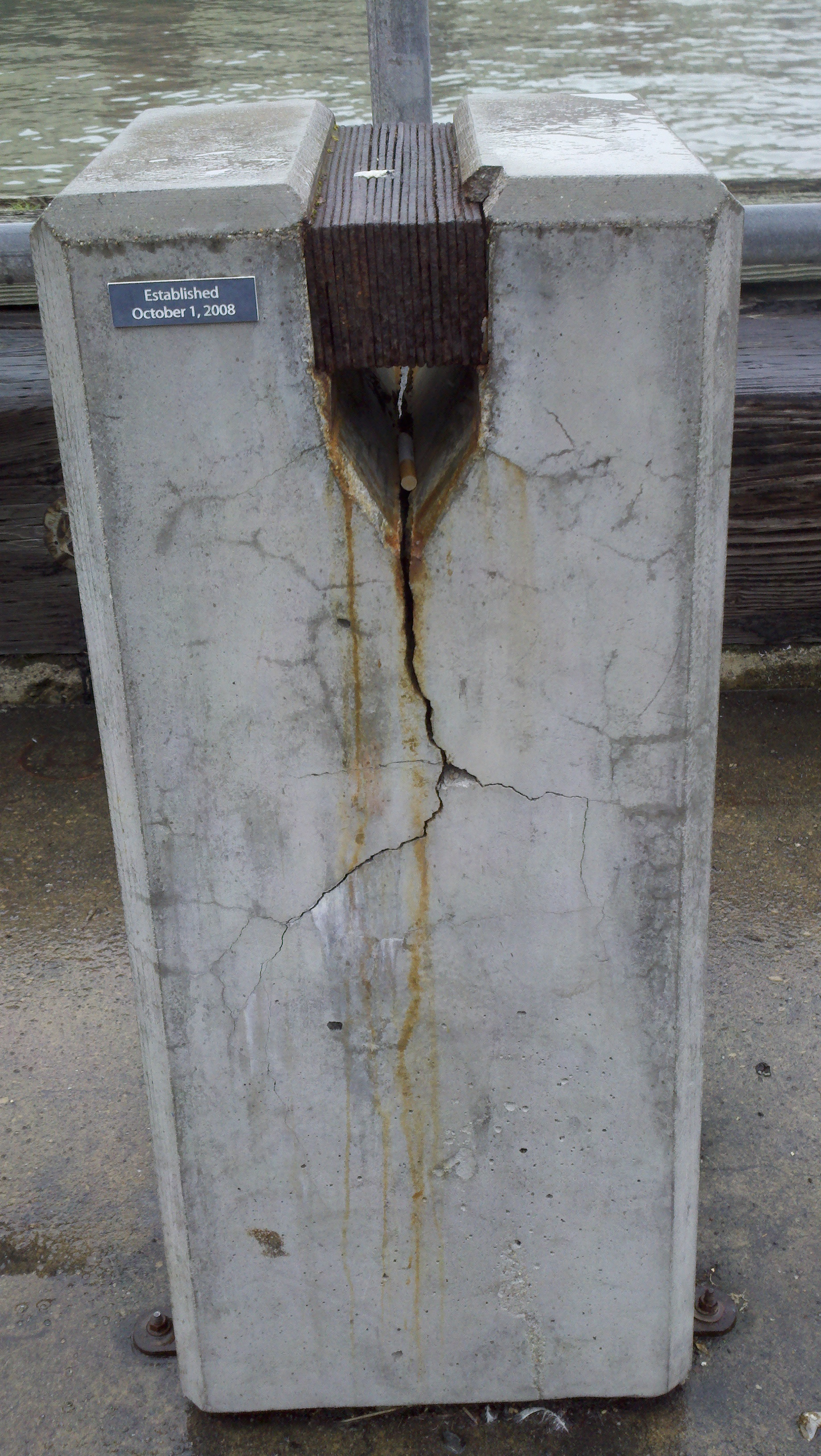
Outdoors "Rust Wedge" display shows the enormous expansive force of rusting iron

The Exploratorium campus comprises 330,000 sq ft (31,000 m^{2}) of indoor and outdoor exhibit space and includes 1.5 acres (0.61 ha) of freely accessible public space. The exhibits are housed in and around Pier 15, which extends over 800 ft (240 m) over the Bay.

The Exploratorium at Pier 15 was designed by architectural firm EHDD. The General Contractor was Nibbi Brothers, and the Glazing Contractor was AGA (Architectural Glass and Aluminum). The piers had been neglected for decades prior to the Exploratorium’s move, and extensive renovation and repair were required. Nearly two thirds of the pilings under Pier 15 were repaired, including almost every piling needed to provide structural integrity, and new pilings were sunk. The removal of the parking lot between the piers was done slowly over the two years of construction, and the debris from the removal was captured and recycled. Several pilings were left in the water between the piers, both for aesthetic reasons and to support future exhibits.

An effort was made in the construction of the new location to preserve the historic elements of Pier 15. The Bay Observatory was the only new structure added to the site. The east end of the pier was cleaned of lead paint, revealing historic lettering underneath; designers chose to preserve the lettering rather than paint it over. As a result, the traces of the shipping lines that originally frequented the pier can still be seen. Some of the preservation efforts presented challenges in design, however; historic windows created energy losses that had to be offset elsewhere, and the historic interior trusswork was mainly restored rather than removed, meaning that the upper-level staff offices had to be built around them.

Other challenges to the design of the facilities were presented by the museum’s sustainability initiatives. The use of natural light whenever possible challenged exhibit designers relying on carefully controlled light levels; this was solved by using curtains and glare-reducing paint colors. Other conflicts between construction and energy use included the glass in the observatory, which would have presented a problem in cooling the building on warm days. This was overcome by adding fritted glass to the windows in thin horizontal lines through the panes to decrease the transparency without affecting the views. The fritting also makes the reflective surfaces of the Bay Observatory safe for birds.

Pier 15 incorporated two seismic joints as part of its seismic retrofit, one separating the Bay Observatory from the Pier 15 shed and the other separating the entire pier from the land. This second joint ensures that the entire pier will move independently from the land mass in the event of an earthquake, significantly reducing the potential torsional stress. The café at the west end of the Exploratorium is named the Seismic Joint in honor of the joint that cuts through the area of the building where the café is situated.

The aesthetic of the project was defined as "industrial naval chic" in keeping with the pier’s history.

=== Restaurant ===
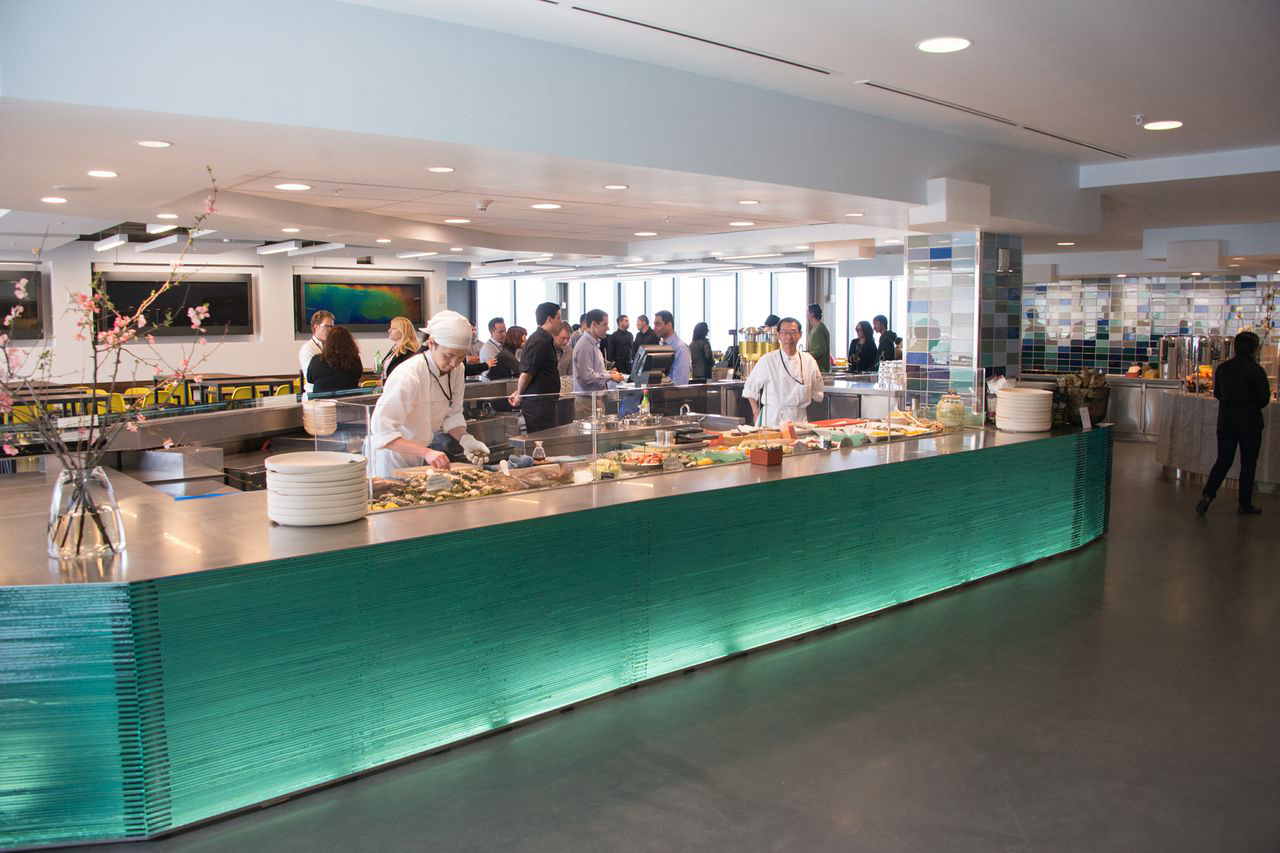
The design scheme for the Exploratorium's Seaglass Restaurant was inspired by the exhibit Color of Water.

The design aesthetic for both the Seismic Joint and Seaglass Restaurant was created by designer Olle Lundberg and based on the exhibit Color of Water. The bar at Seaglass features a specially designed version of Exploratorium artist Shawn Lani’s exhibit Icy Bodies.

=== Sustainability ===
The Exploratorium at Pier 15 has a net-zero energy goal as part of its overall sustainability efforts. Setting this net-zero goal means that, while in operation, the Exploratorium will produce more energy on-site than it will consume on an annual basis. The museum highlights its sustainability efforts in visible ways throughout the museum as part of a stated intention to lead by example.

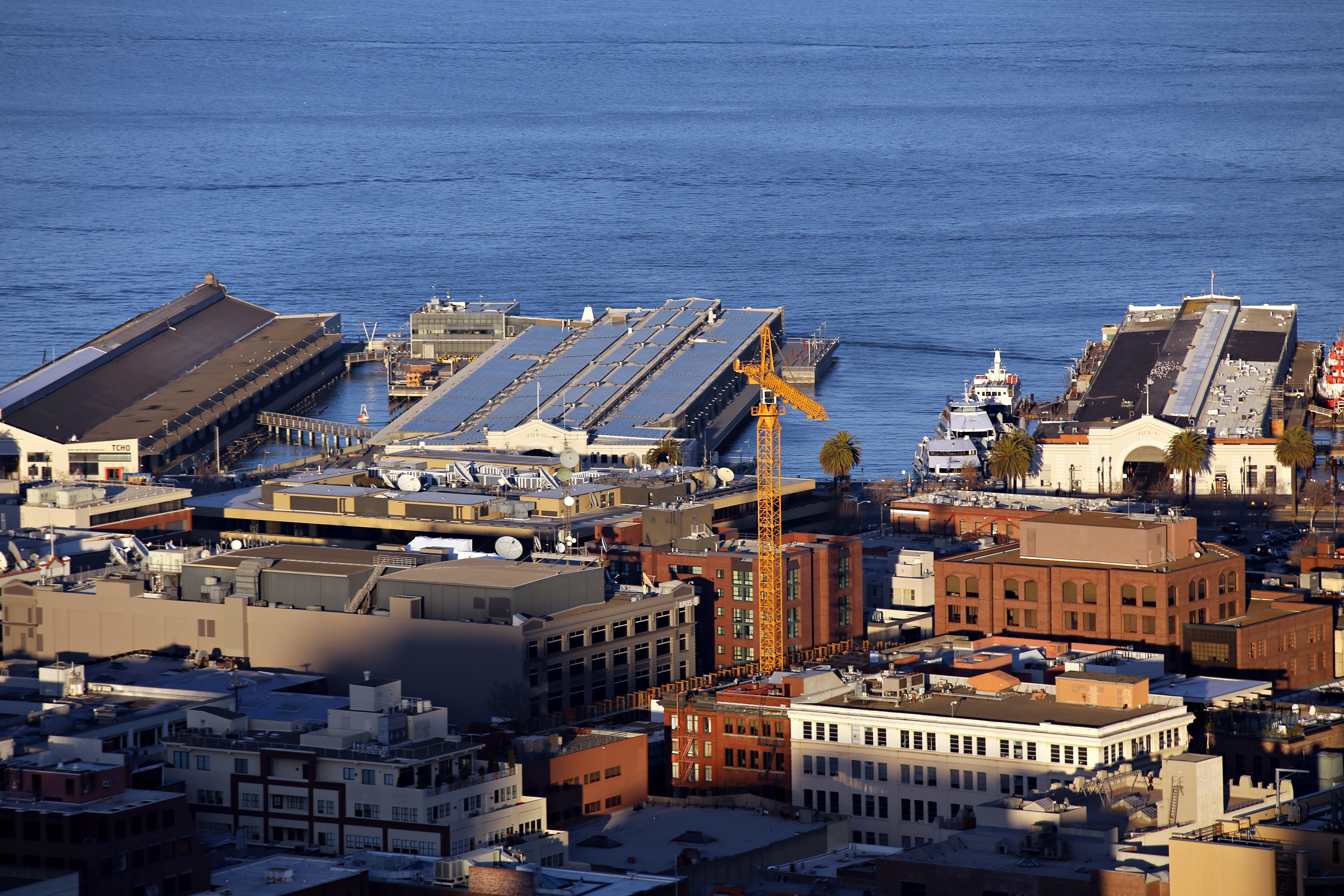
Solar panels are visible on the roof at Pier 15

The Exploratorium, in order to reach its net-zero energy goal, produces energy with a roof-mounted array of photovoltaics. There are 5,874 PV modules on the roof, totaling 78,712 square feet (7,312.6 m^{2}), with a projected year-1 yield of 1.3 MW-AC/square foot (13.9 MW-AC/m^{2}), or a total year-1 yield of 2,113,715 kWh. Any surplus energy generated is intended to be fed back into the utility grid, as the projected annual energy use for the building totals at 1,275,936 kWh.

In addition to solar power, the museum makes use of an HVAC system that takes advantage of the relatively constant, moderate temperature of the bay water under the piers, which is 50 to 65 °F (10 to 18 °C), to heat and cool the building. The bay water is filtered and sterilized before it is brought into a 4,000 US gallons (15 m^{3}) cistern below the pier, where it is held for use. When needed, the bay water is moved to a titanium heat exchanger, of which the building has two, where it is either used to heat or cool water that is cycled through a system of thermally activated radiant slabs. There are 27 miles (43 km) of plastic tubing in the radiant heating system in the floor, creating 82 different heating and cooling zones with distinct control systems. After the bay water passes through the heat exchangers, it is returned to the San Francisco Bay as allowed by a permit issued by the California Regional Water Quality Control Board.

Most of the energy savings are expected to come from using the bay water as a heat sink for the building’s cooling needs. When the temperature of the bay water is below that of the chilled water return from the radiant pipes, which is the case for most of the year in the Bay Area’s temperate climate, the system works in waterside economizer mode. In this mode, the cooling loads are met either entirely or partially through passive heat exchange between the colder bay water and the warmer return water, greatly reducing the building’s energy needs.

The Exploratorium at Pier 15 has a separate system for its ventilation needs, pairing a dedicated outdoor air system (DOAS) with displacement ventilation distribution to bring outdoor air into the building. By integrating radiant heating and cooling and displacement ventilation, the Exploratorium has greatly reduced the portion of its HVAC system that relies on forced air. Reducing the size of a building’s forced air system has the associated benefits of both lower energy loads as well as reduced ductwork, both of which are cost-saving.

The Exploratorium has multiple features designed to reduce its water consumption. Two large cisterns under the structural beams connecting the southeast pilings capture up to 338,000 US gallons (1,280 m^{3}) of rainwater and fog runoff for reuse in the facility. The plumbing is designed for water conservation, with waterless urinals and dual-flush toilets projected to save an annual million gallons of water. Additionally, the bay water heating and cooling system is estimated to save two million gallons of potable water a year by eliminating the need for traditional evaporative cooling towers.

The Exploratorium at Pier 15 also makes use of natural light in the effort to reduce energy loads. The existing building had many clerestory windows and an overhead skylight that runs the length of the interior space. In compliance with historic preservation requirements, the building’s façade was left mostly unchanged, allowing for much of the interior space to benefit from the existing architecture’s ample daylight. The retrofit did include the addition of high-performance glazing to the existing windows.

In January 2014, the Exploratorium was awarded LEED Platinum certification. According to the New York Times, "After a two-year post-opening shakedown period of monitoring and adjusting the systems, the Exploratorium hopes to become the largest net-zero-energy-use museum in the United States and possibly the world."

== Layout ==
The new site contains over 600 exhibits, 25% of which were developed specifically for the Pier 15 site. With the exception of some art installations, all exhibits are developed and made onsite. The indoor and outdoor spaces are divided into six galleries, each highlighting a specific content group. Many exhibits are mobile, however, and move among different galleries; similarly, not all exhibits fall into distinct categories.

Exhibits cover a range of subject areas, including human perception (such as vision, hearing, learning and cognition), the life sciences, physical phenomena (such as light, motion, electricity, waves and resonance, and magnetism), local environment (water, wind, fog, rain, sun, and other elements, as well as cityscape, landscape, and the flora and fauna of the Bay) and human behavior (such as cooperation, competition, and sharing).

=== Bernard and Barbro Osher Gallery 1: Human Phenomenon ===
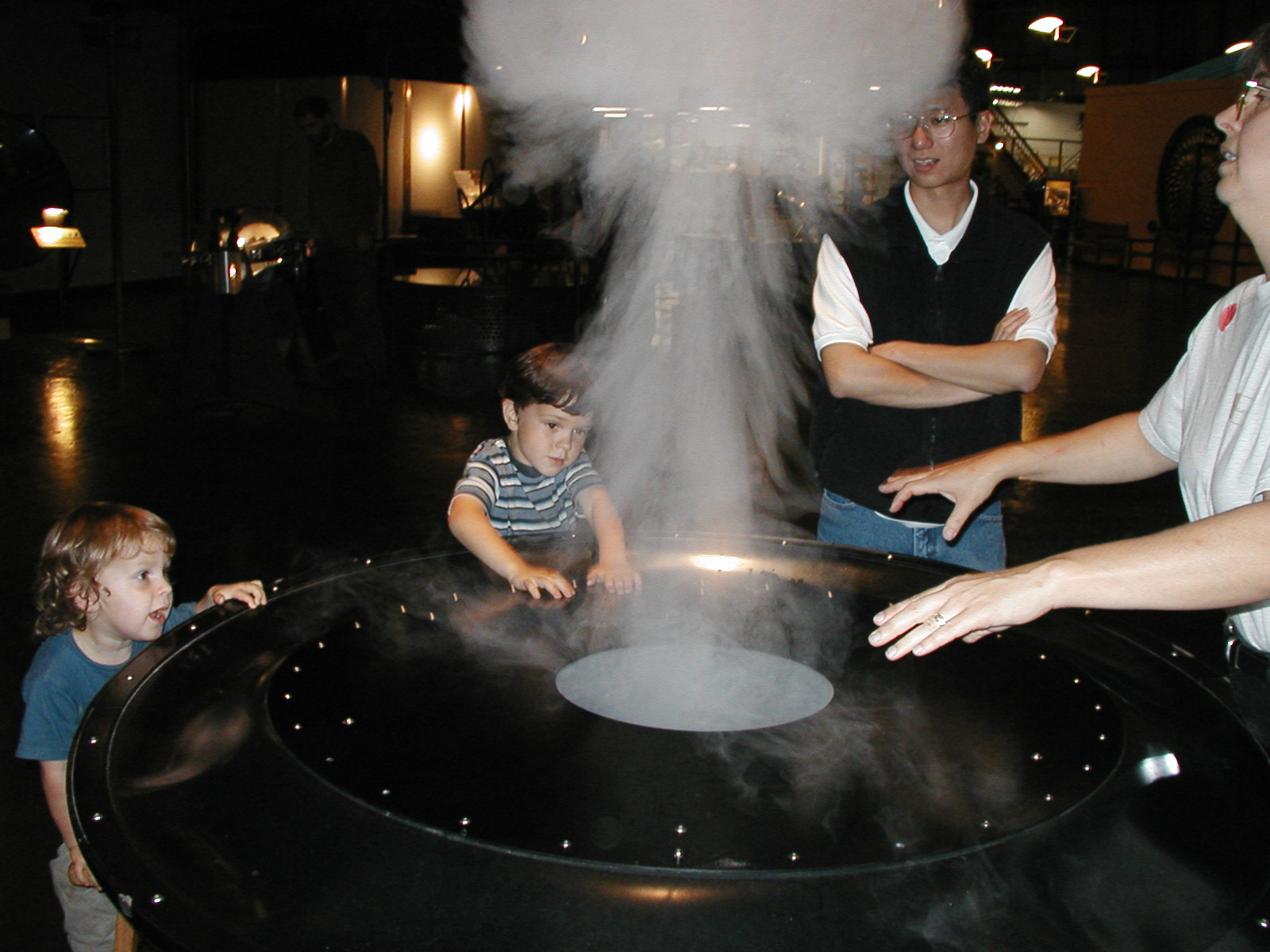
Visitors collaborate to make a smoke ring at the Exploratorium's previous location at the Palace of Fine Arts

Gallery 1, previously known as the West Gallery, focuses on human behavior. Its signage and exhibits encourage visitors to play with perception; investigate memory, emotion, and judgment; and experiment with how people cooperate, compete, and share. It holds exhibits such as Poker Face (partners try to assess when someone is bluffing), Trust Fountain (an experimental exhibit from the museum’s National Science Foundation-funded Science of Sharing project, this two-person drinking fountain is based on the Prisoner’s dilemma, a classic scenario centering on negotiation and trust), and the Tactile Dome, a pitch-black single-path maze environment visitors explore by touch, which was originally designed by Carl Day, August Coppola, producer. Gallery 1 also included the temporary exhibition The Changing Face of What is Normal: Mental Health, which showcased the personal artifacts of patients from the now-decommissioned Willard Psychiatric Center, which was on view through April 2014.

The Osher Gallery also houses the Kanbar Forum, a cabaret-style theater that hosts music events, science lectures, and other programs.

=== Gallery 2: Tinkering ===
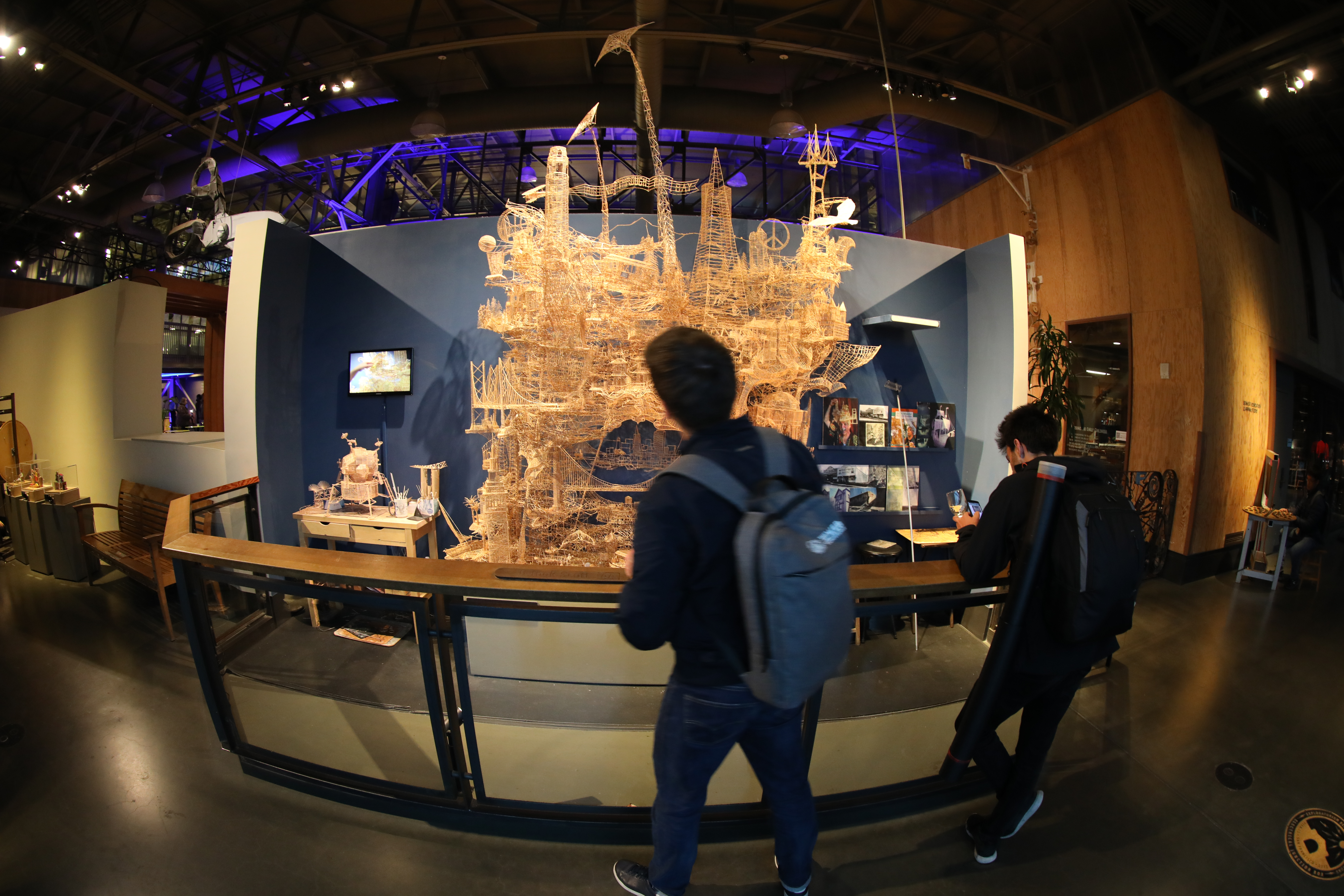
Toothpick sculpture

Gallery 2, previously known as the South Gallery, is a workshop area where visitors can engage in hands-on making, located directly across from the Exploratorium's own internal exhibit workshop, which is also open to their view. Oppenheimer wanted visitors to be able to "smell the oil" and insisted that the usually hidden exhibit-building activities be on display as an exhibit in its own right. Exhibits in the Gallery 2 highlight a DIY aesthetic, and include Animation Stations where visitors can make their own stop-motion films.

Artworks on display include the Tinkerer’s Clock (a 22-foot-high clock constructed by artist Tim Hunkin, with figurines in his noted cartoon style that can be manipulated by visitors and unfold into a clockface on the hour); and Rolling Through The Bay (a sculpture made by artist Scott Weaver over the course of 37 years, utilizing over 100,000 toothpicks and depicting many of the Bay Area’s iconic landmarks, through which a ping-pong ball can roll on one of several different "tours").

=== Bechtel Gallery 3: Seeing and Reflections ===
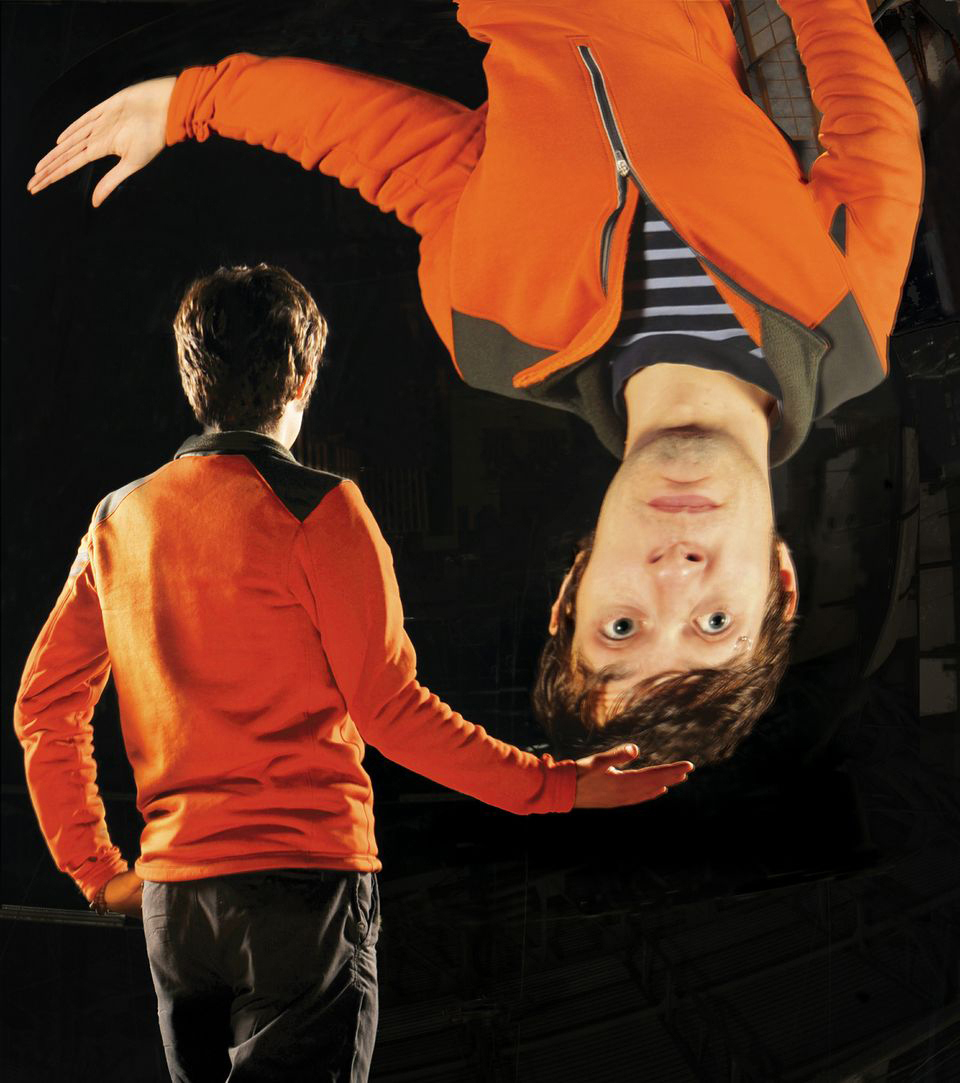
A visitor investigates the reflective properties of the Giant Mirror in the Central Gallery of the Exploratorium at Pier 15.

Gallery 3, previously known as the Central Gallery houses many of the "classic" Exploratorium exhibits, including many of those that have been on display since the very earliest years of the museum. It includes a mix of new and old exhibits that investigate physics and the perception of light, color, and sound, such as Sound Bite (a demonstration of hearing with the jawbone instead of the ears) and Bright Black (a trick of perception convinces viewers that an object is white when it is almost entirely black).

=== Gordon and Betty Moore Gallery 4: Living Systems ===
Gallery 4, previously known as the East Gallery, houses a much-expanded selection of life sciences exhibits. Many exhibits relate directly to the immediate local environment, such as the Glass Settling Plate (barnacles and other creatures are grown on a plate in the Bay, then put live under a mobile microscope to be observed from both above and below) and the Algae Chandelier (visitors can pump air to nourish overhead tanks of colorful phytoplankton). Other exhibits explore different biological systems and processes, such as the imaging station with mouse stem cells, the live cow’s eye dissections, and the Live Chicken Embryo (one of the oldest of the Living Systems exhibits, showing live chicken embryos at different stages of development).

=== Gallery 5: Outdoor Exhibits ===
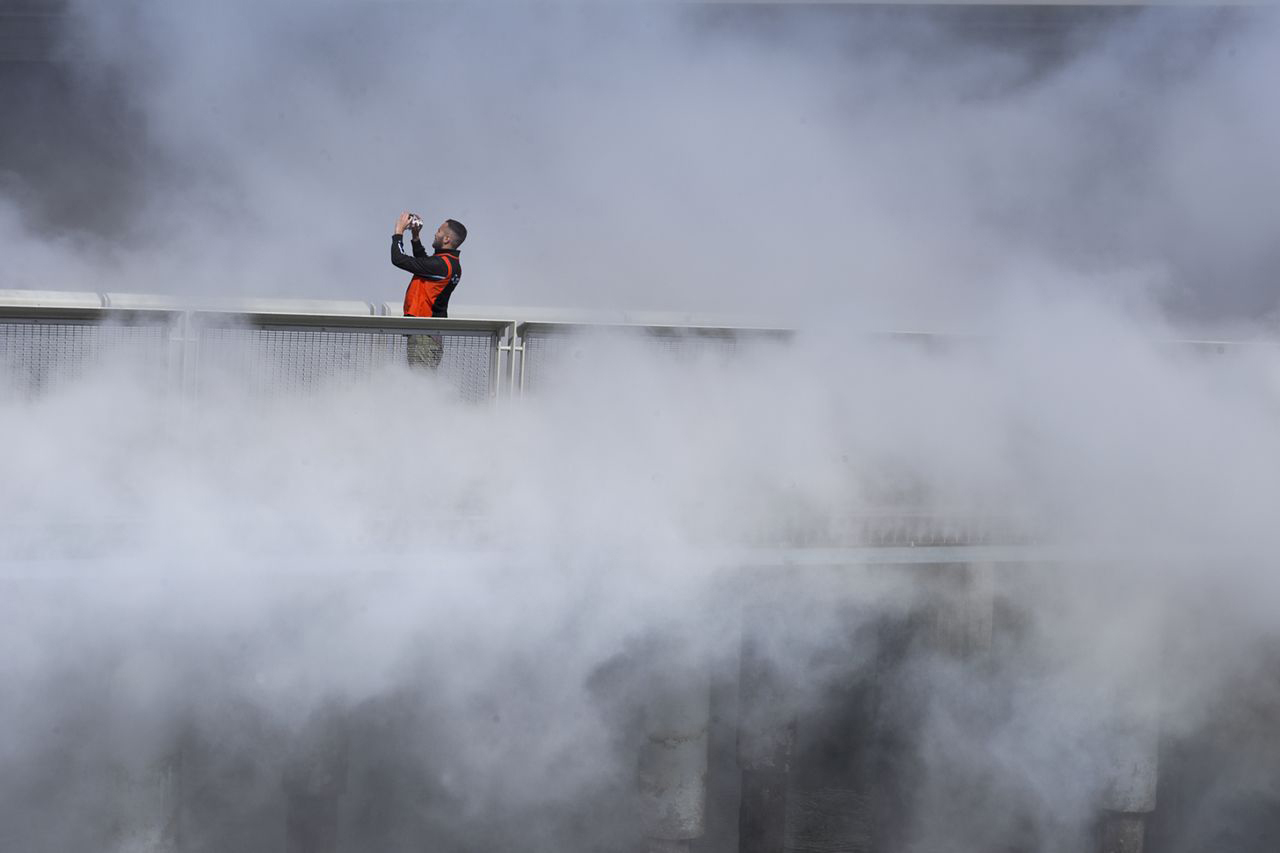
Mist from Fujiko Nakaya’s Fog Bridge drifts over the water between Piers 15 and 17 at the Exploratorium.

Gallery 5, previously known as the Outdoor Gallery, comprises the north, south, and east aprons of Pier 15, and extends through both ticketed and un-ticketed space. Focus is on direct interaction with the Bay environment, which can be seen in exhibits such as Color of Water (an installation of 32 distinct color swatches suspended below the rail surrounding the pier so that visitors can investigate the changing colors of the Bay’s water). Another notable exhibit is Remote Rains, which allows visitors to choose a past rainstorm as profiled by the Hydrometeorology Testbed, which is then recreated by a rain machine that duplicates the frequency, size, and velocity of the raindrops, giving a tangible experience of NOAA research data on storms.

Along the publicly accessible bridge connecting Piers 15 and 17, artist Fujiko Nakaya created an installation called Fog Bridge #72494 that creates bursts of fog for six minutes every half-hour as the first in a series of large-scale temporary installations called Over the Water. The Fog Bridge is 150 feet (46 m) long and makes use of 800 nozzles to create the fog, which Nakaya hopes will inspire visitors to pay attention to the nature of one of San Francisco’s best-known weather patterns. Although originally slated to be temporary, it is now on permanent display. A desalination system, located in Pier 17, conditions bay water for use in the artwork.

=== Fisher Bay Observatory Gallery 6: Observing Landscapes ===
The Bay Observatory building housing Gallery 6 is the only new building constructed on the Exploratorium’s campus. It holds the Seaglass restaurant on its lower level and exhibits on the upper level relating to the waterfront and the cityscape. The gallery focuses on what visitors can see in real time, including the movement of clouds and tides, the changing waterfront, the movement of ships, and interpretation of oceanographic data. The Observatory has glass walls on all four sides to facilitate observation. Many of the exhibits were developed specifically for the location, such as Oculus (a circular opening in the ceiling that allows the entire gallery to be used as a timepiece, tracking seasons, solstices, and the sun’s movement), Visualizing the Bay (a 3-D topographic map of the Bay Area that allows visitors to see real data mapped over the landscape, such as the movement of fog and the salinity of the Bay over the course of days or years), and the Map Table (an assortment of historic and contemporary maps and atlases displaying different views and perspectives on the landscape).

The Bay Observatory also houses the Wired Pier project, which consists of more than a dozen sensors on and around the Bay Observatory that stream real-time data about the surrounding environment, such as quality of air and bay water, weather, tides and pollution, and compile it into interactive visualizations.

=== Public space ===
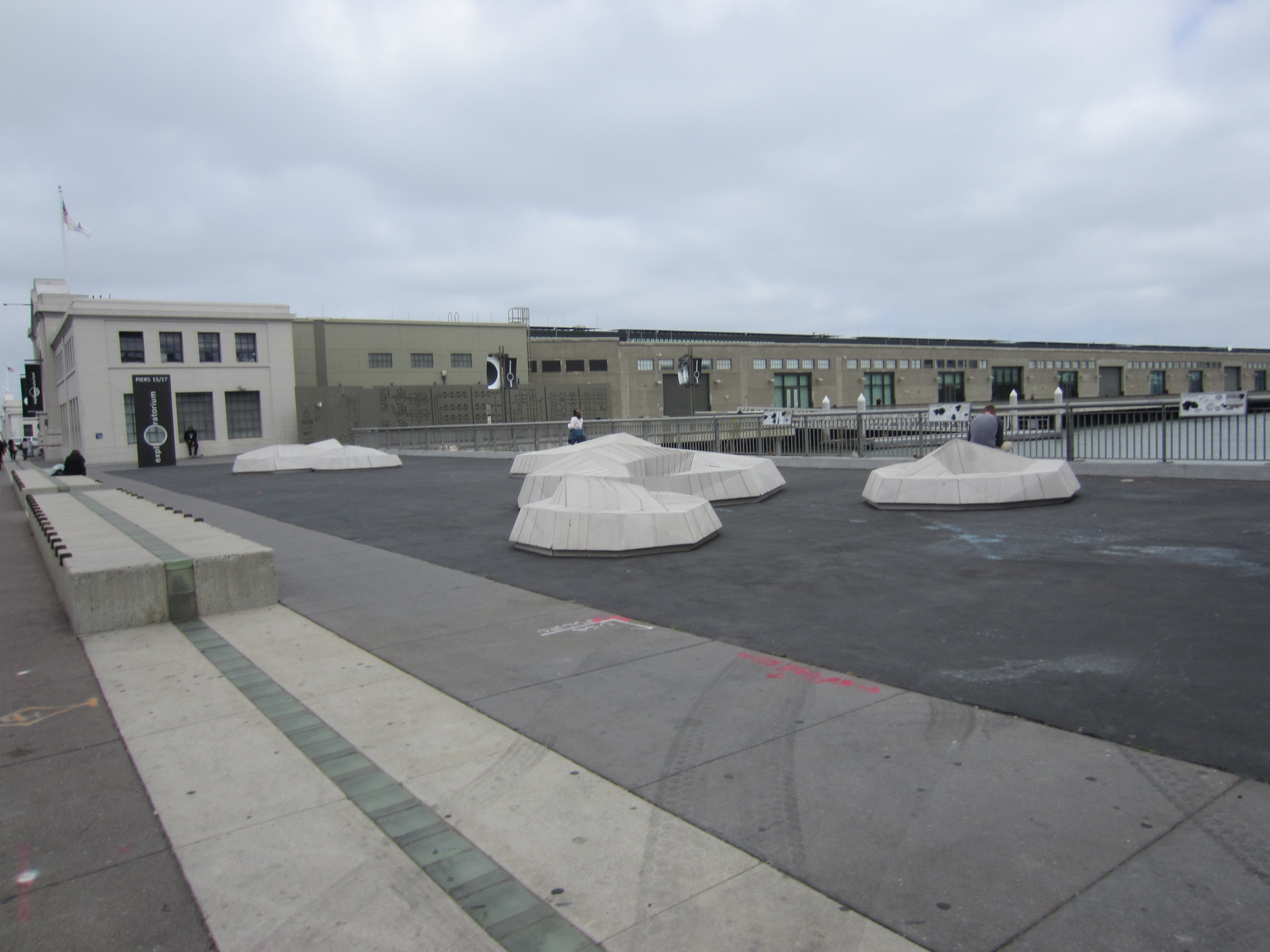
This exterior public space is sometimes used for special events

The Exploratorium campus includes 1.5 acres (0.61 ha) of publicly accessible open space. This includes the plaza facing on the Embarcadero, the connector bridge between Piers 15 and 17 where Fog Bridge # 72494 is installed, the south apron of Pier 17, and the east and south aprons of Pier 15. This public space overlaps Gallery 5, and includes some notable exhibits, such as the Aeolian Harp (an expanded version of the original installation by Doug Hollis on the roof of the Exploratorium at the Palace of Fine Arts, first created in collaboration with Frank Oppenheimer in 1976) and the Bay Windows (visitors spin disks filled with samples of Bay mud, sand, and gravel gathered from five distinct regions of the Bay itself).

=== Restaurant ===
The lower level of the Bay Observatory Building houses the Seaglass Restaurant, which, like the Seismic Joint Cafe, is open to unticketed members of the public. Both the Seismic Joint and Seaglass are run by Loretta Keller, chef-owner at Coco500, in partnership with Bon Appetit Management Company.

== Educational programs ==
The Exploratorium seeks to bring hands-on inquiry to education, including training teachers in the teaching of science. Between 1995 and 2012, an estimated 6,400 educators from 48 states and 11 countries directly participated in Exploratorium workshops.

=== Teacher Institute ===
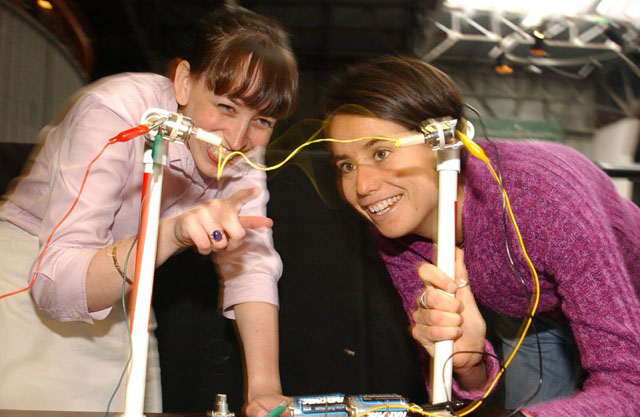
Teachers from the Exploratorium's Teacher Institute examine the "String Thing" they built

The Teacher Institute, founded in 1984, is an Exploratorium-based professional development program geared towards middle and high school science teachers. In addition to providing workshops at the museum that teach hands-on and inquiry-based teaching methods, it provides coaches and support for novice teachers. Studies have shown that while 30 to 50 percent of new teachers leave the profession within five years, the retention rate for teachers who go through the Teacher Institute is 85 to 90 percent.

The Teacher Institute is also home to the Iron Science Teacher, a national competition that celebrates innovation and creativity in science teaching, which originated at the Exploratorium in San Francisco. Parodying the cult Japanese TV program, Iron Chef, this competition showcases science teachers as they devise classroom activities using a particular ingredient — an everyday item such as a plastic bag, milk carton, or nail. Contestants are currently or formerly part of the Exploratorium's Teacher Institute and compete before a live audience for the title of "Iron Science Teacher". Shows are also archived on the Exploratorium's website.

Two out of three teachers applying were being turned away due to space limitations, by the time the Exploratorium closed at its former location; following the move to the Piers, the Exploratorium has been expanding its professional development for teachers through the Teacher Institute. As of 2013, two MOOC courses were also being made available through MOOC provider Coursera. One course integrates engineering into middle and high school STEM classrooms, and the other integrates making and tinkering activities into elementary and middle school classrooms.

=== Informal learning programs ===
The Exploratorium operates several programs centering on informal learning. The Institute for Inquiry (IFI) is a professional development program of the Exploratorium geared towards educators, scientists, administrators, and policymakers. The institute is a recipient of National Science Foundation funding and designs programs, materials and tools to help leaders in the science education community further the role of inquiry in elementary science education and strengthen reform efforts. It consists of workshops and an online library of resources available to participants in the institute.

The Institute for Inquiry partnered with the Sonoma Valley Unified School District on a program combining science education with English Language Development (ELD). Data from the two-year pilot study showed that a professional development program designed to help teachers integrate ELD strategies into science lessons had a significant, measurable impact on the achievement of students in both ELD and in science.

The Center for Informal Learning and Schools (CILS) is a collaboration between the Exploratorium, the University of California Santa Cruz, and King's College London. CILS studies the intersection between museums and schools as centers of informal learning with the intention of understanding how informal science learning occurs and how informal educational centers such as the Exploratorium can contribute to science education reform.

The Tinkering Studio began in 2008 as an in-house program geared towards maker culture and a "think with your hands" approach. It is housed within the museum in a dedicated space in the South Gallery, where it runs free do-it-yourself activities for museum visitors; it also shares its work with a larger audience of educators in afterschool programs, schools, museums and other learning environments. It is being cited as a prototype for similar programs across the globe, including South Korea, Canada, India, and Saudi Arabia. The Exploratorium also operates as afterschool tinkering program in partnership with San Francisco chapters of the Boys and Girls Club. In 2012 the Exploratorium was awarded a grant to create the California Tinkering Network, in collaboration with the Community Science Workshops, Techbridge, the Discovery Science Center, the California Afterschool Network, and the California STEM Learning Network. These organizations partner with over 20 local afterschool or summer programs to provide STEM-enriched activities for children in underserved communities. The initiative was designed to test an adaptable model for providing tinkering activities to promote learning and development in an afterschool setting.

The Exploratorium also houses a number of other educational resources. These include the Learning Commons, a library and media resource center that houses a collection of print and digital science teaching resources for use by regional educators; a webcast studio, located in Gallery 3, which produces 75 educational Webcasts from the museum and locations around the world annually, including a live webcast of the Mars Curiosity Rover launch and landing; and Lifelong Learning, which creates educational programming for children, teens, family groups, and adults. Lifelong Learning programs further the Exploratorium’s stated dedication to informal learning and the museum as teaching tool, and include day camps, workshops for families, the Homeschool Science series (in-house classes geared specifically towards homeschooled students), the Girl’s Science Institute (multi-day workshops geared towards girls 9–11), and excursions for adults. The Exploratorium has also published a number of books, and many of the 50,000 pages on its website are hands-on activity ideas or science experiments in the museums’ signature open-ended style.

=== Educational outreach ===
The Exploratorium operates several educational outreach programs. The Community Outreach Program works with community organizations to provide exhibit-based educational activities for underserved children and families in the local community. The Exploratorium is also home to XTech, a science education program for underserved middle school students. Begun in 2006, XTech was primarily funded by a National Science Foundation grant and provided afterschool activities in science, engineering, and technology in partnership with two community-based organizations in the Bay Area. XTech serves over 100 students a year in addition to 10-15 youth facilitators.

=== Explainers ===
The Exploratorium Explainer program, which has been operating since the museum opened, hires and trains high school students and young educators each year. The program tripled its capacity, hiring 300 Explainers, following the relocation to Pier 15 in 2013. The Explainers function essentially as docents. There are two types of Explainers: High School Explainers, who are teenagers, and Field Trip Explainers, who are college students and young educators. The program was conceived by Frank Oppenheimer in the early days of the museum. He wanted to provide a visitor experience that was a learning experience in a museum context and allowed for guesswork and the absence of "correct" answers. He felt young people would be more capable than adults at conveying the open-ended experience he was looking for. His plan with the Explainers was to "loosen up the whole feeling of learning." Oppenheimer also intended the program to allow students to experience learning outside the framework of their school systems. The Explainers come from a highly diverse array of socioeconomic backgrounds, and he hoped they would bring families and friends who would not otherwise be likely to visit a museum. Both the High School and Field Trip Explainers are paid positions.

The Explainer Program was inspired by the staff demonstrations Frank observed at the Palais de la Decouverte, although the facilitators at the Palais when Oppenheimer visited were either graduate students or practicing scientists. The success of the Exploratorium’s Explainer program led the Palais to eventually hire teenage explainers of their own. Former Explainers often cite their experiences at the Exploratorium as defining elements of their success, including several notable tech CEOs.

== Arts ==
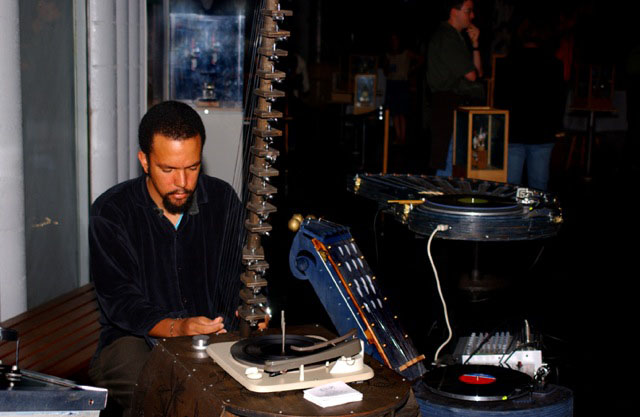
Walter Kitundu - Artist in Residence and MacArthur Fellow

Despite being generally thought of as a science museum, the Exploratorium has always incorporated both science and art. As early as 1966, Frank Oppenheimer presented a paper discussing the connections between art and science, and the role of a museum in appealing to both casual visitors and serious students of all ages.

The formal artist in residence program was started in 1974, inspired by Bob Miller’s Sun Painting (1970) that was commissioned by the museum right after it opened in 1969. Ruth Asawa and Ned Kahn are notable former artists in residence. Since the founding of the artist in residence program, over 250 artworks in various disciplines have been created.

Each year, the museum invites ten to twenty artists to participate in residencies ranging from two weeks to two years. Artists-in-residence work with staff and the visiting public to create original installations, exhibits, or performances. Artists are given a stipend, housing, travel expenses, and technical support, and they have at their disposal the Exploratorium's full array of metal and woodworking shops and materials. Two artists-in-residence who went on to become staff members have been awarded MacArthur Fellowship "genius" grants: Walter Kitundu and Ned Kahn.

The new Embarcadero campus opened with more than 40 pieces by prominent artists, including Douglas Hollis, Golan Levin, Lucky Dragons, Amy Balkin, and Fujiko Nakaya. The Center for Art and Inquiry, a new project at the new location, is an initiative to catalyze and orchestrate art across the museum.

The Exploratorium has an equally long history with musical, film and other performances. Participating artists and performers included Laurie Anderson, John Cage, Philip Glass, Steve Reich, Brian Eno, Ali Akbar Khan, Trimpin, and The Mermen.

In addition to the artists in residence, the museum's Osher Fellows Program hosts 4-8 resident scholars, scientists, educators, and artists every year. Osher Fellows have included Walter Murch, James P. Crutchfield, Christian de Duve, Arthur Ganson, Tim Hunkin, Lewis Hyde, Evelyn Fox Keller, Guillermo Gómez-Peña, Rosamond Wolff Purcell, Oliver Sacks, Mierle Laderman Ukeles, and Juan Felipe Herrera.

== Influence ==
=== Impact ===
The Exploratorium has inspired science museums worldwide, including the Fleet Science Center in San Diego, the Garden of Archimedes in Florence, Italy and the Exploratory (museum) in Bristol, UK. In 2003, The Oxford Companion to the History of Modern Science noted that about 400 science centers in 43 countries were established after the example of the Exploratorium.

=== Website ===
Online since 1992, the Exploratorium was one of the first museums to build a site on the World Wide Web. The site serves 13 million visitors each year. It has received six Webby Awards since 1997, including four for Best Science Website and one for Best Education website, and has been an honoree an additional ten times.

=== Events ===
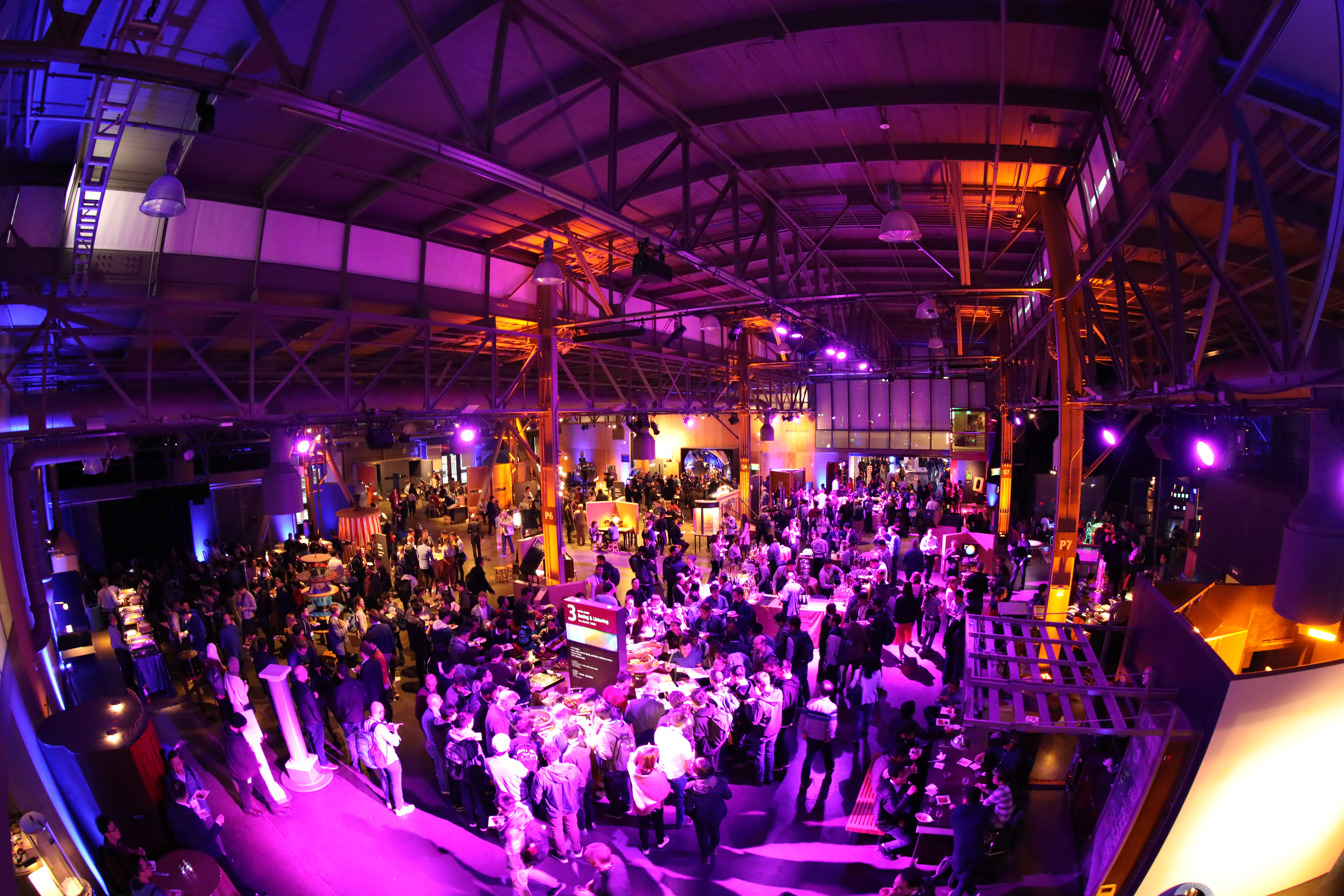
Evening event for adults

Community π Day started at the Exploratorium by Larry Shaw in 1988 and is celebrated annually on 3/14 (March 14).

Every Thursday is "After Dark" for adults.

=== Related points of interest ===
The Exploratorium maintains exhibits in public Bay Area spaces. The Outdoor Exploratorium consists of 14 different exhibits relating to the local environment, all placed outside in the Fort Mason area and accessible to the general public.

== See also ==
- List of science centers
- Misalignment Museum
