= James Tobin (disambiguation) =

James Tobin (1918–2002) was an American economist.

James Tobin may also refer to:

- James Tobin (presenter) (born 1980), Australian television presenter
- Jim Tobin (activist) (1945-2021), American economist and educator
- Jim Tobin (1912–1969), Major League Baseball pitcher
- Jimmy Tobin (1898–1978), Irish hurler
- James Tobin (planter) (1736/7–1817), English merchant, plantation owner in Nevis, and controversialist defending slavery
- James Webbe Tobin (1767–1814), English abolitionist, son of the planter
- James William Tobin (1808–1881), merchant and politician in Newfoundland
- James Tobin (political operative), President George W. Bush's New England campaign chairman
- James Tobin (author) (born 1956), American journalism professor and author
