= Stoney Grove Estate =

Former plantation on Nevis

Coordinates: 17°07′52″N 62°36′35″W

Stoney Grove Estate is a former plantation on the Caribbean island of Nevis. The Stoney Grove Strikers gained their name from here.

The estate is in the parish of Saint John Figtree. It is about is 177 meters above sea level. It is 4.49 acres in size. The estate contains ruins of former buildings, including the great house, whose floor area was 1,900 square feet.

The estate was first owned by James Tobin senior, and then his son, James Tobin (1736/7–1817), from whom it passed to his friend and business associate John Pinney. While James Tobin was an active anti-abolitionist, his son James Webbe Tobin opposed slavery and moved to Nevis in 1809. He built the Palladian mansion, whose ruins are visible today.

At the death of James Tobin in 1817, there were 213 enslaved people on the estate. At emancipation the estate housed 209 enslaved Africans, for which Charles Pinney received £3,572 10s 11d
