= Bristol slave trade =

Slavery in southwestern England

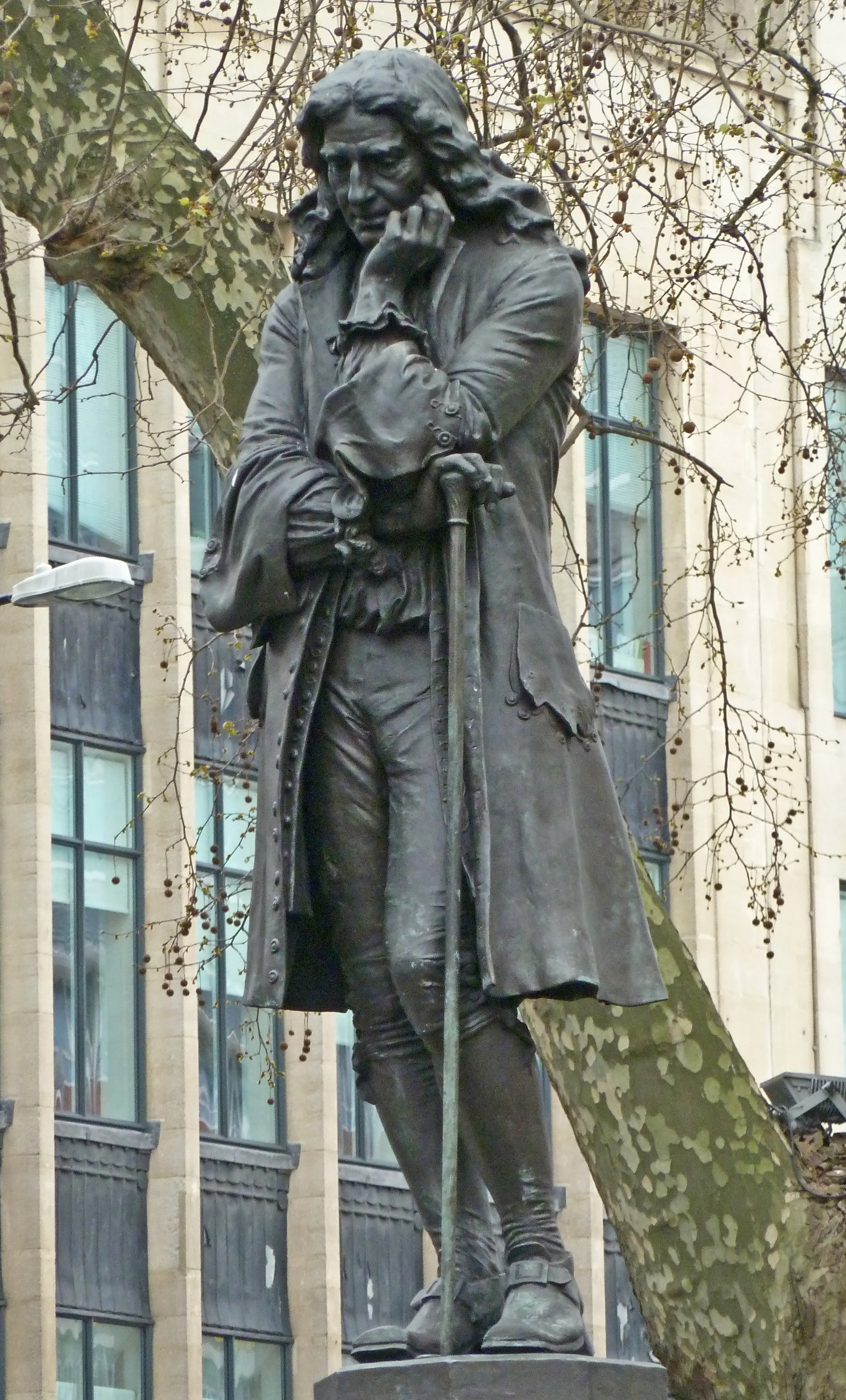
Statue of slave trader Edward Colston, formerly in The Centre, Bristol, erected in 1895, toppled in 2020

Bristol, a port city in the South West of England, on the banks of the River Avon, has been an important location for maritime trade for centuries.

In the time of Anglo-Saxon England, Bristol was the principal port for the export of English slaves to Ireland.

Bristol was one of the leading English ports in the transatlantic slave trade in the 17th and 18th centuries. It has been estimated that Bristol merchants traded over 500,000 enslaved African people.

== Anglo-Saxon slave trade ==
Before the Norman conquest of England in 1066, English slaves were exported to Ireland from a number of ports, including Chester, but Bristol was the main centre, and slaves were brought there from all over the country for export. This trade was brought to an end when William the Conqueror reluctantly agreed to ban the Anglo-Irish slave trade, as a result of a vigorous campaign by Wulfstan, Bishop of Worcester, supported by Lanfranc, the Archbishop of Canterbury.

== Transatlantic slave trade ==
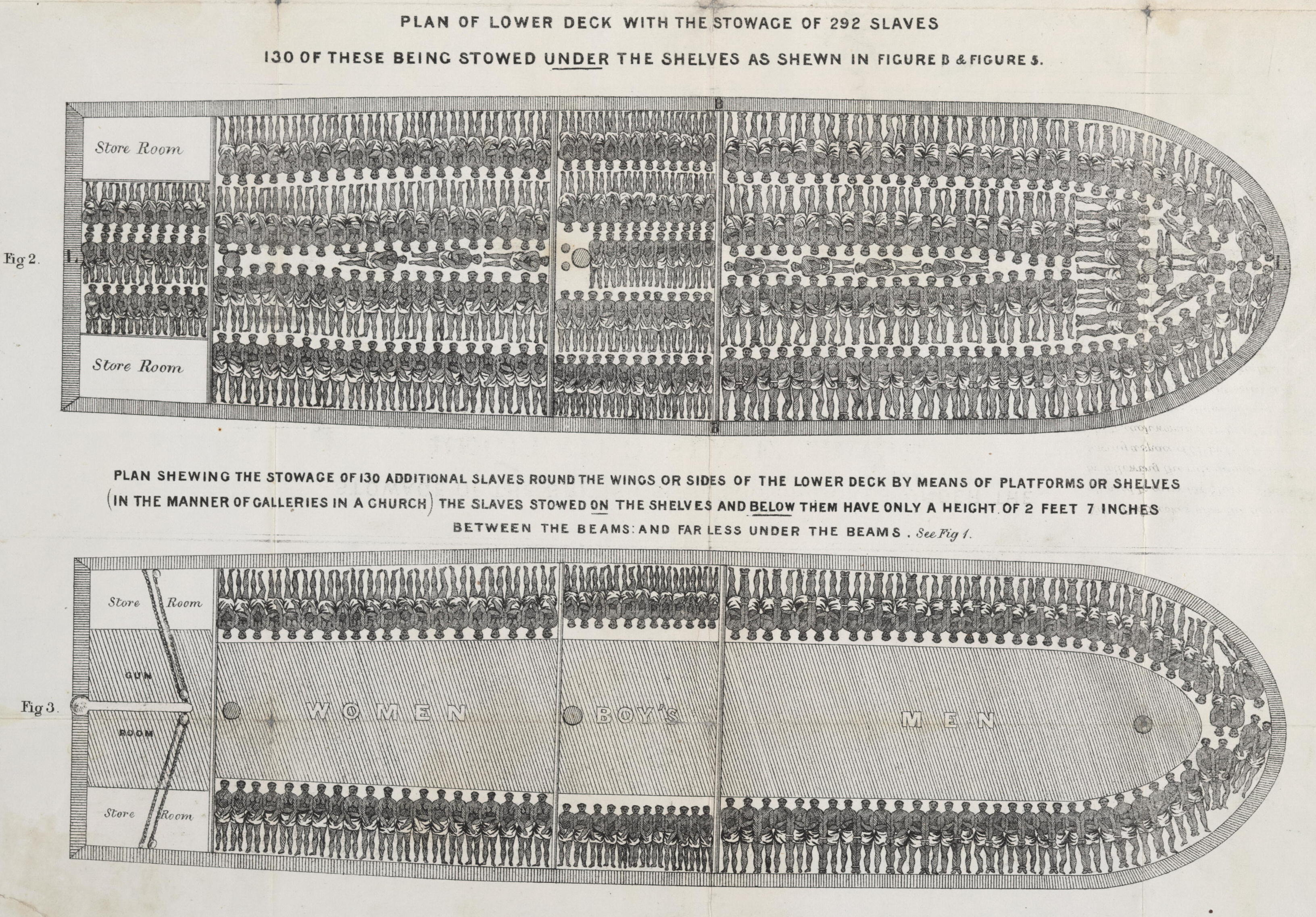
Stowage of a British slave ship, Brookes (1788)

=== Bristol's entry into the transatlantic slave trade ===
The Royal African Company, based in the City of London, controlled all trade between the Kingdom of England and Africa from 1672 to 1698. At this time, only ships owned by members of the Royal African Company could trade with Africa for anything. Slaves were an increasingly important commodity at the time, since the English colonisation of the Caribbean and the Americas in the 17th century had created sugar, rum, tobacco, and cotton plantations, which all needed plentiful cheap labour.

The Society of Merchant Venturers, an organisation of rich merchants in Bristol, wanted to participate in the African slave trade, and after much pressure from them and traders in other English cities, including Liverpool and Hull, the Royal African Company's monopoly over the slave trade was broken in 1698. As soon as it was broken, Bristol commenced its participation, although it is thought that unlawful involvement in the trade had preceded this. What is thought to have been the first "legitimate" Bristol slave ship, the Beginning, owned by Stephen Barker, purchased a cargo of enslaved Africans and delivered them to the Caribbean. Some typical slave prices were then £20, £50, or £100. In her will of 1693, Jane Bridges, a widow of Leigh-upon-Mendip, bequeathed her interest of £130 in this ship to her grandson Thomas Bridges, indicating that the vessel was owned in the City of Bristol. Due to the over-crowding and harsh conditions on the ships, it is estimated that approximately half of each cargo of slaves did not survive the trip across the Atlantic.

Bristol became one of the biggest centres of the transatlantic slave trade between 1725 and 1740, when it is estimated that profits of 5-20% were made from the trading of black slaves. Between 1730 and 1745, it became the leading English slaving port.

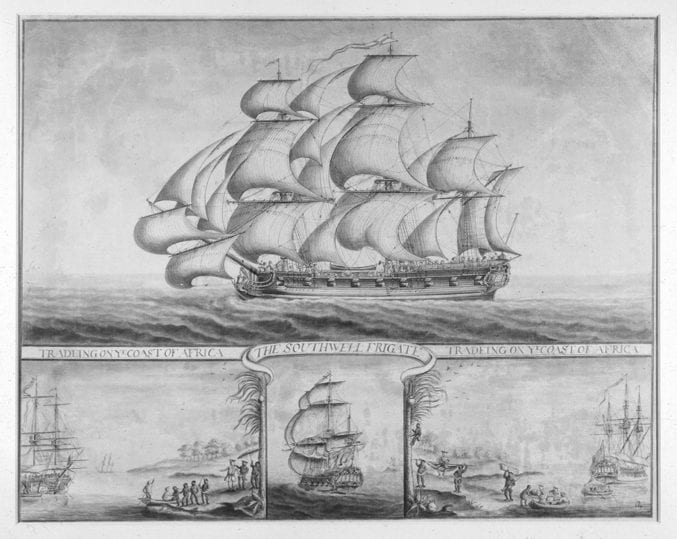
The Southwell frigate, a Bristol slaver

By the 1730s, an average of 39 slave ships left Bristol each year, and between 1739 and 1748, there were 245 slaving voyages from Bristol (about 37.6% of the whole British trade). By the mid 1740s Liverpool became the largest slave trading port in Britain. After 1750 Liverpool's control of the industry continued to grow. In the period between 1793 and 1807, when the slave trade was abolished, Liverpool accounted for 84.7% of all slave voyages, with London accounting for 12% and Bristol 3.3%.

In 1750 alone, Bristol ships transported approximately 8,000 of the 20,000 enslaved Africans sent that year to the British Caribbean and North America.

=== Number of enslaved African people traded ===
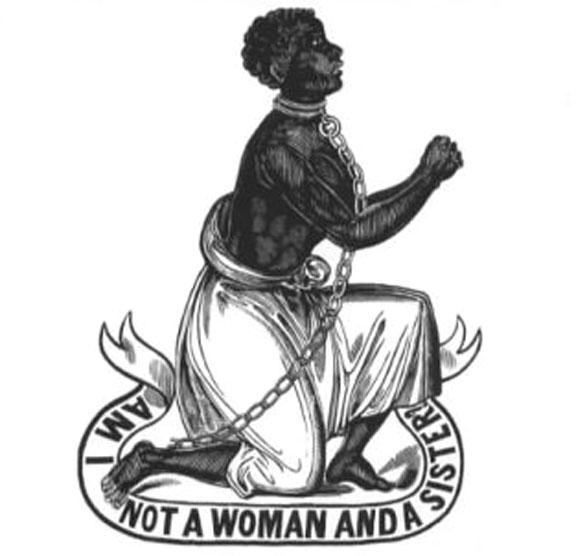
"Am I not a woman and a sister?" antislavery medallion from the late 18th century

An estimated 2,108 slaving ventures departed from Bristol between 1698 and 1807. The average number of enslaved people on a ship was considered to be in excess of 250. It is therefore estimated that merchants in Bristol were responsible for more than 500,000 enslaved African people being shipped to the Caribbean and North America.

=== Triangular trade ===
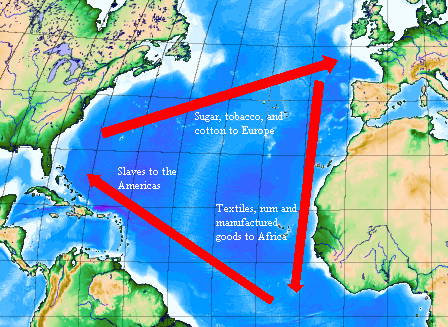
Depiction of the classical model of the triangular trade

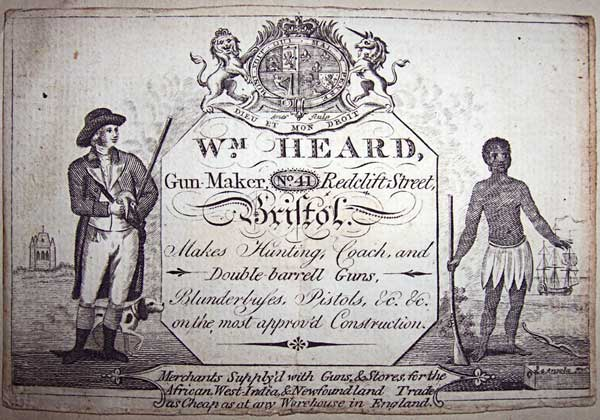
A Bristol gun maker's business card.

The triangular trade was a route taken by slave merchants between England, Northwest Africa and the Caribbean during the years 1697 to 1807. Bristol ships traded their goods for enslaved people from south-east Nigeria and Angola, which were then known as Calabar and Bonny. They exchanged goods produced in Bristol like copper and brass goods as well as gunpowder, which were offered as payment of shares in the voyages by Bristol tradesmen and manufacturers. The ships set sail to St Kitts, Barbados and Virginia to supply English colonies requiring free or cheap labour to work on sugar and tobacco plantations, with enslaved Africans. Alongside slaves, the colonies were supplied with a wide range of goods for the plantations by the Bristol ships; this included guns, agricultural implements, foodstuffs, soap, candles, ladies' boots and "Negro cloths" for the enslaved, from which the British economy benefited. Some Bristol slave merchants were also importers of goods produced in the plantations. This meant that the Bristol economy was intrinsically linked to slave-produced Caribbean goods such as sugar, rum, indigo and cocoa. These goods were imported for sugar refining, tobacco processing and chocolate manufacturing; all important local industries which employed thousands of working-class people in Bristol and the surrounding areas.

== Legacy ==
=== Racism ===
The slave trade significantly influenced the growth of racist theory as a method for society to justify itself. Stories of slave rebellions, runaways and attacks on plantation owners in the colonies were printed in the British press to perpetuate the myth that Black people were unreasonable and violent.

=== Street names, schools and public buildings ===
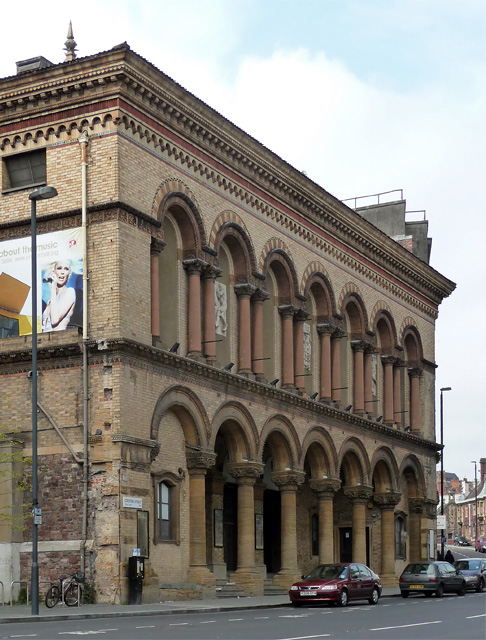
Bristol Beacon, formerly Colston Hall, in Bristol

Street names such as Guinea Street, Jamaica Street, Codrington Place, Tyndall's Park, Worral and Stapleton Roads are references to Bristol's involvement in the transatlantic slave trade. Using the wealth generated from the slave trade, merchants invested in purchasing land, cultural buildings and upgrading ships in Bristol. The Theatre Royal, Bristol, which is the second oldest working theatre in the country, was built as a result of very wealthy subscribers (that directly or indirectly benefited from businesses involved in the slave trade) each pledging a sum of money for the building. Some buildings and institutions such as schools were named after their slave trading benefactors; for example, Colston Hall, Colston Girls School and Colston Primary School (since renamed to Bristol Beacon, Montpelier High School, and Cotham Gardens Primary School respectively) were named after Edward Colston, Bristol's most famous philanthropist, a Bristol-born slave trader, senior manager of the Royal African Company and member of the Society of Merchant Venturers.

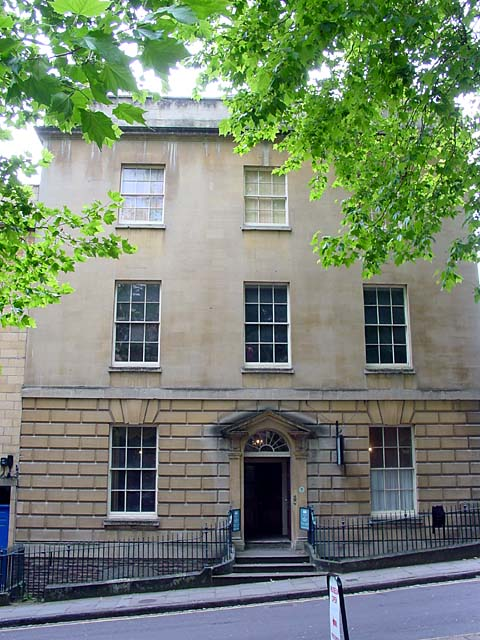
The Georgian House

The Georgian House in Bristol was built for John Pinney (1740–1818) who owned several sugar plantations in the West Indies. From 1762 to 1783, Pinney lived on the island of Nevis, running his plantations, but in 1783 he returned to England and settled in Bristol. When Pinney moved to Bristol, he brought two black attendants with him, Fanny Coker and Pero Jones, both of whom he had bought in 1765. Pero was twelve years old when bought along with his two sisters, Nancy and Sheeba, then six years old. There is related original documentation held by the University of Bristol library, for example, the record of when Pinney bought Pero and his two sisters and proof of their age when bought. Pero's sisters Nancy and Sheeba were left behind to work on the Montravers plantation in Nevis. Pero died in 1798, aged 45 in Ashton, Bristol. Built in his memory, Pero's Bridge, a footbridge across the River Frome in the docks of Bristol, was opened in 1999.

=== Commercial ===
Several Bristol banks, such as the Bristol Old Bank, were founded by prominent slave traders and merchants, such as Isaac Elton. They have amalgamated and changed names many times before becoming part of other institutions, notably NatWest.

=== Profit and wealth ===
Residents in Bristol could financially benefit from the slave trade in a myriad of ways. This was primarily from investing in the slave voyages, which were sometimes funded by as many as eight investors. They also benefited from industries which facilitated the slave trade, for example, employment in the production of goods that were exported to the plantations and to Africa, employment in the ships which carried enslaved Africans and local goods and, from the handling and further refinement of cargoes received from the plantations. It is estimated that by the late 1780s, Bristol earned £525,000 per year from all of these slave-related commercial activities. Since this was past the peak of Bristol's participation in the slave trade, it is likely that Bristol's earnings from the commercialisation of enslaved Africans and related activities were much higher in the earlier 18th century.

Whilst the Bristol economy benefited, it was primarily the merchants that owned the ships who made significant material gains in their personal family wealth. The merchants were organised as a group in the Merchant Venturers Society. Given their status with holding leadership positions in Bristol, the Society was able to successfully oppose movements to abolish the slave trade in the late 1700s in order to maintain their power and source of wealth. The slave trade in the British Empire was abolished in 1807 however the institution itself was not outlawed until 1834. Following the Slave Compensation Act 1837, which compensated slave owners for the loss of what was considered their property, according to the Bristol Museums, plantation owners based in Bristol claimed over £500,000, equivalent to £2bn in 2020.

=== In popular culture ===
The folk duo Show of Hands have written and performed a song entitled "The Bristol Slaver" covering the subject.

=== Museums ===
M Shed in Bristol explore Bristol's involvement in the transatlantic slave trade in their "Bristol People" gallery. It features a section on the legacies of the slave trade on some of Bristol's public institutions. It features the antislavery movement as the beginning of a display on modern public protests including the Bristol Bus Boycott, treating the abolition campaign as the start of a British tradition of society campaigning. M Shed held a workshop on Bristol and the Transatlantic slave trade from September 2019 to July 2020. This workshop encouraged students to investigate historic objects, modern attitudes and opinions and to consider how Bristol was changed by its involvement in the slave trade. M Shed also held a workshop in February 2020 on "Slavery, public history and the British country house", outlining the historic links to slavery of many country houses in the south west of England.

New Room, Bristol has an exhibition about the abolitionist John Wesley and the Methodist response to slavery.

== See also ==
- Dinah Black
- John Pinney
- Slave Coast
- Lancaster slave trade
- Role of Nantes in the slave trade
