= Thomas Daniel (merchant) =

English merchant and Caribbean planter (1762–1854)

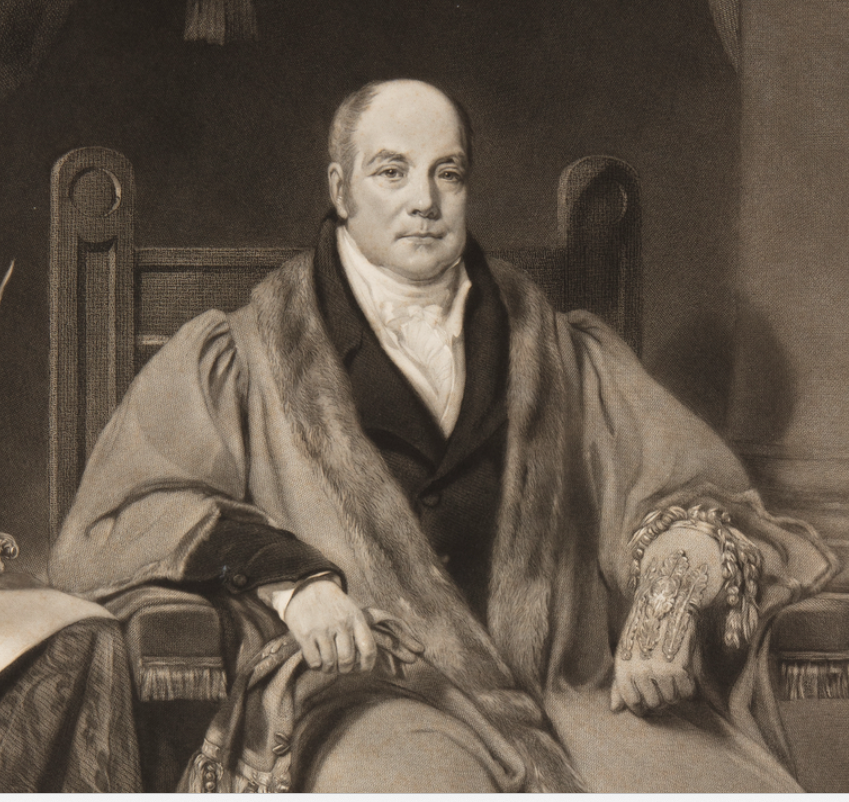
- Portrait of Thomas Daniel
- Born: 16 September 1762; Barbados
- Died: 6 April 1854 (Aged 91); Bristol
- Occupations: financier; sugar merchant; business man; local politician; bank owner
- Known for: Company received one of the largest financial awards in UK when slavery was abolished. Tory who dominated politics in Bristol at the beginning of the 19th century.
- Spouse: Susanna Cave (m. 1789)

Thomas Daniel (16 September 1762 – 6 April 1854) was a shipping magnate, financier and sugar merchant in Bristol and London. He was part of the third generation of a merchant dynasty originating from Barbados, which rose to become one of Bristol's wealthiest and most politically influential families. Daniel's extensive influence earned him the titles "King of Bristol" and later, the "father of Bristol", reflecting his significant role in corporate and political affairs spanning over five decades.

Across the Americas he owned plantations. He was a partner in many Bristol businesses (see list) and owned 25 ships transporting goods from the West Indies.

The extent of his family's company Thomas Daniel & Sons in Bristol and Thomas Daniel & Co. in London, founded by his father in the mid-eighteenth century, was such that when slavery was abolished in 1834 the British Government awarded it one of the largest compensation awards in the UK for 4,642 African and Caribbean people.

Thos. Daniel & Sons and Thos. Daniel & Co. provided mortgages for plantation owners. Between 1823 and 1843 he and his brother headed the list of British merchants who were the major creditors for estates that passed through the chancery courts in Barbados. During that time they extended £62,694 in credit (the total amount of mortgages extended during this period in Barbados was valued at £256,981).

The vast extent of this mortgage lending has been attributed to the amount of compensation the company received being so high – the company becoming shareholders in failing plantations they provided mortgages to, and subsequently in the enslaved individuals. For decades he was a key member of organisations in Bristol such as the Society of Merchant Venturers and the West India Association which lobbied against the abolition of slavery.

He was a leading Tory in Bristol and a member of the Council continuously for more than 56 years. Daniel was wealthy, but did not leave any testamentary legacies to the city.

== Early life ==
Daniel was born in Barbados on 16 September 1762, the son of Thomas Daniel (1730–1802) and his wife Eleanor Neil (1737–1774). He was the fourth generation of the Daniel family to be born on the island since his great-grandfather had emigrated there from England in the mid-17th century. His siblings were Eleanor (b. 1761), Anne (b. 1763) and John (b. 1765).

In 1764 Thomas Daniel Snr. returned to England, and settled in Bristol where he established a substantial business as a sugar merchant importing slave-produced sugar whilst still owning Blowers Plantation in Barbados. Thomas Daniel Snr.'s memorial in Bristol Cathedral refers to him as a "respectable merchant in this city" which as contemporary authors on slavery assert gives no indication of the source of his wealth – enslaved labour.

In 1789 Daniel married Susanna Cave (1767–1846), the daughter of banker John Cave and Susanna Cox. Daniel's sister Anne married Susanna Cave's brother, Stephen. He had six daughters and one son: Maria Anne, Frances, Susanna, Lucy, Eleanor, Emily and Thomas.

== Politics ==
From 1785 until 1835 Daniel served on the Bristol Common Council. He was an Alderman from 1798 until 1835, a Councillor from 1835 until 1841, Sheriff of Bristol in 1786/7, and Mayor in 1797/8. Throughout the 18th century the Whig party predominated in Bristol's Council, but from 1812 Daniel and his fellow Tories gained control until the Municipal Reform Act in 1835, with Daniel having a significant influence during that period. He and his fellow Tories transformed the corporation into a largely Anglican body, and used their influence to raise election funds to support their preferred Tory MP candidates.

At the age of 72, on 1 January 1836, Daniel was again elected as Mayor, but he refused to serve, and the same year he surrendered his leadership of the Tories which he had dominated for decades.

Daniel was one of the earliest members of the Bristol West India Association formed in 1782. It was Bristol merchants' main body for dealing with the Government, and lobbying against the abolition of the slave trade. Joining when he was 20, he remained a member for life, holding the offices of Treasurer, Secretary and Chairman.

Daniel was also a member of the Society of Merchant Venturers (acting as both Warden and Master between 1789 and 1805). This was the period when the Society worked to safeguard the interests of planters and all those involved in the Transatlantic Slave Trade. On 15 April 1789 Daniel was one of 21 West India merchants and planters at the first anti-abolitionist meeting convened by the Society of Merchant Venturers.

== Business interests ==
Daniel traded as a sugar merchant from his town residence 20 Berkeley Square, Bristol as Thomas Daniel & Sons, the firm he inherited from his father, importing slave-produced sugar from the Americas. He traded with his brother John Daniel (1768–1853) as Thomas Daniel & Co. in London at 4 Mincing Lane. Thomas Daniel & Sons were the fifth largest importer of slave-produced sugar into Bristol over the 70-year period 1735 to 1800, importing 20,993 hogsheads of sugar between 1785 and 1800.

Between 1786 and 1831 Daniel was the owner or part owner of more than 25 ships mainly sailing back and forwards between Bristol and the Americas with goods connected to the slave economy transporting goods needed on the plantations on the outward journey and slave-produced sugar on the inward journey. At least 1 of his ships (Berwick) had been in the service of the East India Company, but under his ownership sailed back and forwards to the West Indies. Two of his ships (Britannia and Deane) were privateers during the American Revolutionary War. He was also a partner in firms such as Daniel, Harford & Co. importing goods from Newfoundland and northern Europe to Bristol and exporting to the West Indies.

There is no evidence that he was involved in buying or transporting people in Africa to sell as slaves in the Americas.

Daniel provided mortgages for plantation owners. Between 1823 and 1843 he and his brother headed the list of British merchants who were the major creditors for estates that passed through the chancery courts in Barbados. During that time they extended £62,694 in credit (the total amount of mortgages extended during this period in Barbados was valued at £256,981).

Daniel was a partner in the bank Ames, Cave and Co.; he had shares in the Bristol Dock Company, and the Bristol Copper Company; he was a partner in the White Rock Company (copper) and the iron merchants Daniel, Harford, Weare and Payne. All of these companies had direct links to the slave economy. See table for details of these and others.

He owned large pockets of land across Bristol. See table below for details.

When the British Government passed the Slavery Abolition Act 1833 they awarded £20 million to slave owners. Thomas Daniel received £71,248 across 29 awards in Antigua, Barbados, British Guiana, Jamaica, Montserrat, Nevis, and Tobago. This was for 4,642 enslaved people. It was the third largest mercantile recipient of compensation with his brother John Daniel. In 2022 his portion (the figure quoted above) is the equivalent of approximately £10.7 million based on the percentage increase in the Retail Price Index from 1834 to 2022.

== Cultural and philanthropic interests ==
Daniel was a founding member of cultural institutions in Bristol: the Bristol, Clifton and West of England Zoological Society (now Bristol Zoo), The Bristol Institution for the Advancement of Science, Literature and Art (now Bristol Museum and Art Gallery), and the Victoria Rooms. In 2020 these organisations are still in existence.

In 1829 Daniel was a member of the Committee which led to the building of the Clifton Suspension Bridge. One of the original 3 trustees who first met on 17 June 1830, he later chaired the first full meeting of 31 trustees on 22 June 1830. He pledged to loan £600 of the £17,350 committed to the project.

Daniel was President of Bristol charities including The Colston Society and The Dolphin Society. The Colston Society was founded in 1726 to emulate the philanthropic work of Edward Colston. It announced its closure in 2020 following the re-evaluation of Colston after the toppling of his statue on 7 June 2020. The Dolphin Society was set up for the same reason in 1749 and in October 2020 was still registered with the Charity Commission.

Bristol Corporation ran three charity schools governed by the Mayor and Alderman. One was the Red Maids School where "aided by the personal interest of Alderman Daniel and his wife, the headmistress conducted the school on approved contemporary lines."

List of Thomas Daniel's cultural, philanthropic and business interests and associations
Name	Role	Known dates	Notes
Ames, Cave and Co bank	Partner	1800–1821	Partner in bank established by his father-in-law, John Cave.
Bedminster Coal Mine	Lessee	1828–death	Named along with several others in 2 leases in 1828 and 1850 each for 21 years
Bristol Asylum or School of Industry for the Blind	President	1837, 1838	"Thomas Daniel Esq., President, in the Chair"
Bristol Copper Company	Shareholder	1854 (death)	Newspaper advertises two vacant posts in the firm on the deaths of 'Mr Daniel and Mr Cave, both considerable shareholders'
Bristol Dock Company	Original investor and director	1803	Daniel was a 'leading original investor' with 70 shares of £100 each. 'A quarter of the initial £250,000 subscribed to develop the docks under the 1803 Bristol Docks Act came from just five families (Harford, Hill, Hart Davis, Daniel and Weare).'
Bristol Fire Office (insurance)	Director	1819–1832 still listed	1819 & 1832 named as 1 of 7 Directors
Bristol Imperial Fire Office	Honorary superintending director	1840–1853	"Bristol Imperial Fire Office. Subscribed and invested capital, £1,500,000. Honorary Superintending Director at Bristol, Thomas Daniel, Esq."
Bristol Corporation of the Poor	Governor (1806–1807), treasurer (1810–1817)	1806–1817	
Bristol Savings Bank	Trustee	1828–1850	Bank established 1812; he is one of 8 Trustees listed in 1828; resigned in 1850
Clifton Suspension Bridge	Original trustee	1830 – before 1836	In 1829 on the bridge committee, and named as one of the bridge's first 3 trustees in 1830.
Bristol Theatre Royal	Shareholder	1785–death	Daniel was too young to be an original founder of the theatre in 1766, but acquired his share (silver token no. 34) on 22 December 1785
Bristol, Clifton and West of England Zoological Society	Shareholder	1836	There were about 250 original shareholders, the majority holding 1 or 2 shares. Daniel had 2 shares
Bristol Corporation	Councillor (1785–1798), alderman (1798–1835), mayor (1797 & 1836, but declined to serve), sheriff (1786)	1785–1835	See main text
Colston Society	President	1807	See main text
Dolphin Society	President	1816	See main text
Dr White's Charity	Trustee	1837–1841	Founded in 1622 and run by Bristol Corporation until 1835 when Bristol Charities was established.
Gloucestershire Society	President	1815	Founded in 1657. As of 2020 it was still a registered charity.
Great Western Railway	Shareholder	1835	Daniel had 70 shares at £100 each
Daniel, Harford, Weare and Payne	One of the owners	1793	Iron merchants at the Quay
John Freeman and Copper Co. trading as The White Rock Company	One of the owners	1818	The company had mines in the Lower Swansea Valley, Stanton Drew, Pensford, Bitton & Swineford
Justice of the Peace		1841–death	
Landowner	Landlord	On-going	Daniel owned about 120 different plots of land in Bristol, in Bedminster, Knowle, Henbury & Westbury on Trym. Most of it he rented out. He owned other land jointly with various partners e.g. in Clevedon
Mortgage Lender	Lendee	On-going	He was a mortgagee for many plantations in the Americas. See main text
Prudent Man's Friend Society	Vice president	1814, 1815	'The PMFS had as its vice-president[s] Thomas Daniel, the leading Tory-Anglican' & etc.
Queen Elizabeth's Hospital	Treasurer	Not known	
Red Maids School	Treasurer	Not known	
Samaritan Society	Member for Life	Not known	'Among the "members for life" of the Samaritan Society were Quakers ... alongside Anglicans Thomas Daniel ...' etc.
Severn Humane Society	Director (founded 1793)	1793	Daniel listed as one of 13 Directors at the meeting on 14 October 1793 'to provide the means of making the institution of the Severn Humane Society of service to the city and county of Bristol.'
Ship owner	Owner	1786–1831	See main text
Society of Merchant Venturers	Warden (1789, 1796, 1798), master (1805)	1789–1834	See main text
The Bristol Institution for the Advancement of Science and Art	Vice president	1825 & other years	See main text
The Victoria Rooms	President	1838	See main text
Thomas Daniel & Sons (and Co.) est.1763	Sugar merchants	for life	See main text
Bristol West India Association	Founder member, treasurer, secretary, chairman	1782–death	See main text

== Legacy ==
Daniel died at 92 of "natural decay and sinking of vital powers" at his home 20 Berkeley Square, Bristol on 6 April 1854 and was buried at St Mary's, Henbury where he had his country residence.

On his death he was described as "amongst the mightiest of our city magnates" in an obituary that says "[there was a time] when the name of Alderman Daniel was almost idolised by [the Tory] party... however ... he had come to be regarded as ranged with the traditions of the past."

Another obituary said: "... Alderman Daniel became the idol of one side, and the dread of the other, and on the occasion of the lamentable riots in this city in 1831, many and deep were the threats uttered by the mob that he should suffer ... The estates of the deceased gentleman in the West Indies are of great extent, and he was of course a considerable sufferer by the suicidal policy of our Government a few years since. He leaves also large landed estates in Devonshire and Gloucestershire ... His business faculties remained unclouded to the very last, and he was actively engaged in the concerns of the eminent firm in which he was senior partner until within a very few days of his death ... [He was] the gentleman who for many years enjoyed the title of 'The Father of Bristol'."

In his will Daniel bequeathed sums to servants, family, friends, political and business colleagues. He left the majority of his estate to his son Thomas. He did not make a single charitable bequest in his will. His estate was said to be worth £200,000.

As at 2020, Daniel's main residence in Berkeley Square is a private member's club: The university and Literary Club.

In 1836 his son Thomas Daniel purchased two estates of over 4,000 acres in Devon (the last of which was sold in 1924); in 1838 he purchased an additional 707-acre estate in Stockland Bristol, in Somerset for £34,000 from the Bristol Corporation, which it had owned since the 16th century.

Thomas Daniel & Co. remained an active owner of sugar plantations, particularly in British Guiana and Barbados until its voluntary liquidation in 1894.

== Danielstown ==
"Danielstown" in Guyana formerly British Guiana is said to be named after the family. This is stated in two articles in the Guyana Times International and Guyana Chronicle in 2014 and 2017, which describe an Englishman 'Mr. Daniel', the owner of a local sugar factory in Sparta being 'very instrumental in the development of the village'.

The 2017 article written by the late reporter Mohamed Khan states that Immediately after emancipation Mr Daniel an Englishman and the owner of plantation Sparta, Fear Not, Coffee Grove and Lima decided to sell his lands to free African slaves on the Essequibo Coast. The article says economic circumstances had forced Mr Daniel to sell his estates because they were unprofitable after slavery ended in 1834. Many sugar, coffee and cotton plantations in particular, faced competition with cheap labour in the USA by other enslavesd people, and the owner could not survive in such a situation. Many of the estates were left abandoned.

The articles go on to say that Mr Daniel, the owner of these four amalgamated estates of Lima, Coffee Grove, Fear Not and Sparta decided to sell Danielstown, and a group of free African slaves seeing their brothers buying up abandon estates to live on, pooled their money and bought Danielstown for £2000 British pounds in 1840. These Africans like many others Africans, had saved money that they earned over time by working on the sugar, coffee and cotton plantations. They were mainly the headmen from the four sugar estates.

Khan writes that shortly after Mr Daniel sold his land, he requested of the new owners to rename the plantation Danielstown in his honour. This was done and he donated his own money to help develop Danielstown for the free Africans slaves so they could live a happy and comfortable life.

The article should be approached with some caution as to 'Mr. Daniel' being Thomas Daniel, due to his progressing age, memory issues and most significantly anti-abolitionist views during the 1830s. It has been suggested that the 'Mr. Daniel' may instead refer to his son Thomas Daniel (1798–1872), who remained active in the West Indies as a landowner following abolition.
