= Ros Martin =

British playwright, poet, performance artist, curator and activist (born 1960s)

- Born: 1960s London, England
- Occupations: Playwright, poet, performance artist and activist
- Notable work: Daughters of Igbo Woman
- Relatives: Orlando Martins (uncle); Taslim Martin (brother)
- Website: www.olawalearts.org.uk

Ros Martin (born 1960s) is a British playwright, poet, performance artist, curator and activist, born in London and based in Bristol since 1995. She is a founder member of the Bristol Black Women's Writers Group (2002–2005) and "Our Stories Make Waves" (OSMW) and Speakeasy South West, the latter two both associations of African diaspora artists in creativity. She was a member of the Bristol Black Writers Group.

== Biography ==
Born in London, England, Ros Martin is second-generation British, her parents being from Nigeria and Saint Lucia. Her uncle was pioneering Yoruba Nigerian film and stage actor Orlando Martins (1899–1985), and she has been researching and developing material in connection with his life. Roles he played on the London stage included Boukman in Toussaint Louverture: The Story of the Only Successful Slave Revolt in History, a 1936 drama by C. L. R. James that starred African-American actor Paul Robeson, with whom Martins had featured in the 1935 film Sanders of the River.

She is the artistic director of the Daughters of Igbo Woman Project, "a transnational digital installation comprising a trilogy of literary films made in (UK, Nigeria & Nevis respectively)". In 2017, responding to Bristol's transatlantic slavery legacy by evoking the voices of three generations of women from one family separated by the Atlantic Ocean. The films were made in collaboration with Akachi Adimora-Ezeigbo and Vida Rawlins. Martin voiced Fanny Fumnanya Coker, maidservant at the Georgian House, Bristol, Rawlins voiced Coker's mother, Adaeze (or Black Polly), and Eziegbo voiced Fanny's grandmother, Ojiugo in Igbo. Also in 2017, Martin created a memorial event and video in Greenbank Cemetery to commemorate the 250th anniversary of Fanny Coker's birth.

Publications in which Martin's writings appear include Marginalia (Volume 2 of Jerwood/Arvon Mentoring Scheme anthology) No Condition is Permanent, 19 Poets on Climate Justice and Change (Platform, 2010), and the 2019 anthology New Daughters of Africa, edited by Margaret Busby.

Martin has been a driving force behind the "Countering Colston" campaign group, an anti-racist, pro-equity collective working to decolonise Bristol, including addressing ways in which the city has for centuries honoured Edward Colston, who was a slave trading merchant in the 17th century. Among initiatives for which she campaigned was the renaming of Colston Hall (now Bristol Beacon), which came about in September 2020.

On 25 January 2021, Martin was one of four protesters arrested by the police for peacefully demonstrating outside Bristol magistrates court in support of the "Colston Four", the three men and a woman accused – and cleared at trial – of toppling the statue of Edward Colston during the 2020 Black Lives Matter protests. Martin had chalked the words "Let Justice Prevail" on the pavement outside the steps of the court. Avon and Somerset Police subsequently apologised for the protest ban, accepting that they had misinterpreted the regulations and that the arrests were unlawful.

Martin is the author of the 2022 book Before I Am Rendered Invisible – Resistance From The Margins, a volume of spoken word, social commentary, play, essay and memoir that "throws a harrowing spotlight on issues behind racial inequality". She has said: "'Before I Am Rendered Invisible' is a personal archive of performance writings that chart black struggle and resistance in Bristol and beyond, in spoken word, play, public chalk events, social commentary and memoir. In 'Before I Am Rendered Invisible', I am remembering, I am giving space, affording time, giving voice to the little people's lives, to events that have mattered to me, that have provoked me, whilst living and working in Bristol. I am countering the silence, bringing to the fore and celebrating marginalised lives of struggle and resistance."

Martin initiated the project "Raising the Red", an art installation in Bristol honouring women around the world who have been victims of violence, created to coincide with the United Nations "End Violence Against Women" campaign.

== Selected works ==
- 2013: Return of the Vanishing Peasant (stage play), with Denise Ferreira da Silva
- 2016: Being Rendered Visible in the Georgian House Museum, Bristol
- 2022: Before I Am Rendered Invisible – Resistance From The Margins, Arkbound, ISBN 9781912092468.
