= Fumnanya =

- Gender: Female
- Language(s): Igbo

Origin
- Word/name: Nigerian
- Meaning: love me

Fumnanya is a female Igbo given name meaning love me. Notable people include:

- Fanny Fumnanya Coker
- Fumnaya Shomotun
