= Taslim Martin =

British sculptor and designer (born 1962)

- Born: 1962 (age 63–64); London, England
- Education: Royal College of Art
- Occupations: Sculptor and designer
- Notable work: Blue Earth 1807–2007
- Relatives: Ros Martin (sister)
- Website: taslimmartin.com

Taslim Martin (born 1962) is a British sculptor and designer, creating works that range from public art commissions to domestic-scale items. He has undertaken urban space and park sculpture commissions in the UK and exhibited internationally. He was elected a member of the Royal Society of Sculptors in 2017 and is a Brother of the Art Workers' Guild. Works by Martin are in the permanent collection of the British Museum and of the Horniman Museum. His sister is poet, playwright and activist Ros Martin.

== Biography ==
Taslim Martin was born in 1962 in London, England, to a father originally from Nigeria and a mother from St Lucia. Martin studied carpentry and joinery at Southend College of Art and Technology, earning a City and Guilds certificate in 1981. He worked as a carpenter for ten years. He went on to attend art schools in Cardiff and then at the Royal College of Art in London (1996–98), being awarded the Sir Eduardo Paolozzi Travel Scholarship that enabled him to travel to Nigeria and to undertake research into West African sculpture. After graduating, he spent two years as artist-in-residence at South Hill Park arts centre, Berkshire, which culminated in a solo exhibition in 2000.

His work has since been widely shown, both in the United Kingdom and internationally; he has been engaged in gallery exhibitions, public art commissions and teaching, with his output ranging from portrait sculpture to public art and design. He has said: "From concept to realisation; the designing and making of public art sculptures presents all kinds of interesting challenges, an important part of my job is project management, sourcing materials and services, and presenting to clients, be that a steering group or the local community."

Among notable exhibitions featuring his work have been Mixed Belongings at the Crafts Council in 2005, Contemporary Primitive at the 198 Gallery in 2007, and Taslim Martin: Disparate Nature in 2010.

His sculpture Blue Earth 1807–2007 was installed in the African Worlds Gallery at the Horniman Museum in 2007, in commemoration of the bicentenary of the Slave Trade Act 1807. Among his other public art is Twins, commissioned by Lambeth Council and installed in Brixton in August 2016, as well as a number of sculptures across the UK, including in Bracknell, Tottenham, Birmingham, Cambridge and Milton Keynes.

== Awards ==
- 1997: Sir Eduardo Paolozzi Travel Scholarship
- 1998: Parallel Prize, Parallel Media Group PLC
- 2009: The shape of things bursary
- 2010: Jerwood Contemporary Makers

== Selected exhibitions ==
- 1997: Student Showcase, Museum of Mankind, London
- 1998: Fish & Chips, British Art and Design Festival, Hamburg
- 1998: International Biennial Design Festival, Saint-Etienne
- 2000: The Power to Name, South Hill Park Arts Centre, Bracknell, Berkshire (solo show)
- 2005: Mixed Belongings, Crafts Council
- 2007: Contemporary Primitive, 198 Gallery, London (solo show)
- 2008: Mark of Action, the Art House, Lewisham, London
- 2009: Made in Africa: portrait of an Ife ruler, The Manchester Museum
- 2010: The Global Africa Project, Museum of Art and Design, New York
- 2010: The shape of things at Flow, London
- 2010: Taslim Martin: Disparate Nature, Touchstones Rochdale (solo show)
- 2010: Pan African Craft Exhibition, South Africa
