= Kongi's Harvest (film) =

1970 Nigerian film

- Directed by: Ossie Davis
- Written by: Wole Soyinka
- Produced by: Francis Oladele
- Starring: Wole Soyinka; Orlando Martins; Rasidi Onikoyi; Femi Johnson; Nina Baden-Semper; Dapo Adelugba
- Cinematography: Åke Dahlqvist
- Edited by: Jerry Gränsman
- Music by: Chris McGregor
- Production companies: Calpenny Nigeria Ltd; Herald Productions; Omega Films
- Release dates: May 1970 (Sweden); February 1973 (United States); 1973 (Nigeria)
- Running time: 85 minutes
- Country: Nigeria
- Language: English

Kongi's Harvest is a 1970s Nigerian drama film directed by Ossie Davis. The film was adapted from a screenplay by Wole Soyinka adapted from his 1965 play of the same name. Soyinka, a Nigerian playwright, poet, and the first African to be awarded the Nobel Prize in Literature in 1986, also starred in the leading role as the dictator of an African nation.

The film was produced by Francis Oladele's Calpenny Nigeria Films. The story revolved around the degeneration of personal rule in independent Africa and satirizes the resulting tyranny in terms of the confrontation between a populist politician and a traditional ruler. It is said that the film reflected the rising trend of dictatorships and tyrannical rule in Africa in the 1970s.

== Production ==
The film was shot in Nigeria. It was the first production by a Nigerian indigenous company, and its aim was to change perceptions about the country and the African continent.

The film is based on a play created by Wole Soyinka, who also appears in the film as Kongi. In an advertisement that appeared at the time of the film in The New York Times, Soyinka dissociated himself from the film and denounced the major changes that had been made to his screenplay.

== Plot ==
President Kongi (Wole Soyinka), the dictator of an African developing nation, is trying to modernize his nation after deposing King Oba Danlola (Rasidi Onikoyi), who is being held in prison. However, Kongi's real ambition is that of presiding over the Festival of the New Yam, a spiritual privilege of the king. Kongi struggles to take authority over the festival, as King Oba Danlola had chosen to remain in prison rather than give up the last of his power to Kongi. The spiritual privilege is left to Danlola, who is the king's nephew and heir, and is shown to grow prized yams on his farm. Kongi attempts to find a way to make Danlola submit to his demands.

A third man is introduced into the film, the idealist Daodu. Daodu is the head of a group of young dissidents, who oppose the traditional political system on the one hand and the ferocious modern dictatorship on the other. Daodu's lover Segi owns a bar where Daodu is shown to spend most of his time. Segi is later revealed to have been Kongi's former lover.

The different tribes resist unification, and Kongi attempts to reach his goal by any means necessary, including forcing government officials to wear traditional African outfits and seeking advice from the man he deposed. Kongi eventually demands tribute from Danlola in the form of a yam, an important food in the culture. Kongi also uses 5 men convicted of treason as bargaining chips in the battle for the yam. The day before the festival of the yams, two of the men escape, and one survives.

When Kongi is on the verge of obtaining the yam the next day, the army rebels, and the soldiers take the power into their hands. In a climactic scene at the harvest ceremony, Kongi is shot dead. The final scene depicts the escaped man, Dr. Gbenga, giving a propagandist speech over the same radio once used by Kongi.

== Cast ==
- Wole Soyinka as Kongi
- Rasidi Onikoyi as King Oba Danlola
- Femi Johnson as Organizing Secretary
- Nina Baden-Semper as Segi
- Orlando Martins as Dr. Gbenga
- Dapo Adelugba as Daodu
