= Berwick (1795 ship) =

India-built British merchant ship 1795-1827

History

Great Britain
- Name: Berwick
- Namesake: Berwick-upon-Tweed
- Owner: 1795:McTaggart; 1798:Thomas Daniel
- Builder: David Glass & John Wood, Calcutta
- Launched: 21 September 1795
- Fate: Wrecked 30 June 1827

General characteristics
- Tons burthen: 420, or 426, or 454 (post 1821 repair) (bm)
- Complement: 60
- Armament: 8 × 4-pounder guns
- Notes: Teak-built

== Career ==
Berwick was launched at Calcutta in 1795. She made three voyages for the British East India Company. On her maiden voyage, which was under the auspices of the EIC, she carried rice from Bengal for the British government to alleviate grain shortages in England. When she arrived in England she changed her registry to that of Great Britain. Between her second and third voyages for the EIC Berwick was a West Indiaman, sailing primarily to Barbados. In the 1820s, she sailed to Van Diemen's Land. She made her third voyage for the EIC in 1825. She was wrecked in 1827, on a return voyage from India.

=== 1st EIC voyage (1795–1796) ===
Captain John McTaggart sailed from Calcutta on 23 November 1795. Berwick was at Diamond Harbour on 20 January 1796. She reached St Helena on 25 April, Falmouth on 19 June, and Plymouth on 24 June. She arrived at Long Reach on 8 July. She carried rice on behalf of the British government which was importing grain to address high prices for wheat in Britain following a poor harvest.

Berwick first appeared in Lloyd's Register (LR) with McTaggart master and owner, with her master changing to Wauchope, and trade London–India.

=== 2nd EIC voyage (1796–1797) ===
Captain William Wauchope acquired a letter of marque on 28 June 1796. Berwick was admitted to the Registry of Great Britain on 29 August. Captain Wauchope sailed from Portsmouth on 21 October 1796, bound for Madras. Berwick arrived at Madras on 2 February 1797. She was at Trincomalee on 13 April, and the Cape of Good Hope on 7 July. She reached St Helena on 3 August, and arrived at Gravesend on 28 October.

On her return from India, Berwick became a West Indiaman. Lloyd's Register for 1798, showed her master changing from Wauchope to William Welch, her owner from McTaggart to P.Daniel & Co., and her trade from London–India to London–Barbados.

Lloyd's List (LL) reported on 13 December 1805, that Berwick, Welsch, master, had sunk in Ramsgate harbour. A report about six weeks later stated that she had grounded, but had been gotten off and had returned to the Thames.

Lloyd's Register for 1810 showed Berwick's master changing from Wason to Griffith. Her owner was still Daniel & Co., and her trade London–Barbados. She had undergone a thorough repair in 1806.

On 21 March 1809, Lloyd's List reported that Berwick, Griffiths, master, had not been heard from since separating on 18 December, from the fleet from Barbados. A week later Lloyd's List reported that Berwick, Griffiths, master, had been captured and taken into Guadeloupe. Several weeks after that, Lloyd's List reported that she had arrived at Jamaica on 13 February 1809.

On 22 December 1810, Berwick put into Portsmouth. She had been bound for Barbados but had sprung a leak.

Lloyd's Register for 1820, showed her master changing from S. Compton to W. Tyler. She had undergone a repair in 1811. Her owner was still Daniel & Co., and her trade London–Barbados.

On 4 February 1821, Berwick, Tyler, master, was at 48°N 24°W having lost her rudder, boats, bulwarks and maintopmast. She was proceeding with a jury-rigged rudder. She was sailing from Demerara to London. She underwent repairs in 1821.

Lloyd's Register for 1825, showed Berwick with R. Jeffrey, master, W.C. Hurry and Co., owner, and trade London–Van Diemen's Land. She had been making the run between London and Van Diemen's Land for some time. She had left Gravesend on 6 December 1822, and had arrived in Hobart Town on 21 June 1823. She carried passengers, and delivered some Merino sheep.

The Oriental Herald and Colonial Review reported that Captain Jeffrey and Berwick had stopped at Tristan da Cunha on 25 March 1823, on her way to Van Diemen's Land. She had found it now had a population of 17, or 22 men and three women (accounts differ), and under the leadership of a former British artillery corporal. It was well supplied with domestic animals and grew its own produce and potatoes. Its leader traded with the Cape of Good Hope in a small schooner, delivering seal skins and elephant-seal oil.

On 7 July, after Berwick's arrival, several steerage passengers sued Jeffrey for inadequate accommodations, lack of access to the deck, and water shortages. The court found in their favor and required Jeffrey to pay damages ranging from £8 to £20, relative to a per person charge for the voyage of around £40.

=== EIC voyage #3 (1825) ===
Lloyd's Register for 1826, showed Berwick with T. Eilbeck, master, J. Grieg, owner, and trade London–India.

Berwick left the Downs on 7 June 1825. She arrived at the New Anchorage on 9 November, and at Calcutta on 17 November.

== Loss ==
Berwick was wrecked on 30 June 1827, at Plettenberg Bay, South Africa, as she was sailing from Tellicherry and Bombay for London. Captain Eilbeck, the Second Officer, the carpenter, and twelve seamen drowned.
