= Men of Two Worlds =

- Directed by: Thorold Dickinson
- Written by: Thorold Dickinson; Herbert W. Victor
- Based on: story by Joyce Cary
- Produced by: John Sutro
- Starring: Phyllis Calvert; Eric Portman; Robert Adams; Orlando Martins
- Edited by: Alan Jaggs
- Music by: Arthur Bliss
- Production company: Two Cities
- Distributed by: Rank (UK); International Releasing Organization (US)
- Release dates: 9 September 1946 (UK); 1952 (US)
- Country: United Kingdom
- Language: English
- Budget: £750,000

Men of Two Worlds (US title: Man of Africa; also known as Kisenga, Man of Africa and White Ants) is a 1946 British Technicolor drama film directed by Thorold Dickinson and starring Phyllis Calvert, Eric Portman and Robert Adams. It was written by Dickinson and Herbert W. Victor based on a story by Joyce Cary. The screenplay concerns an African music student who returns home to battle a witch doctor for control over his tribe.

== Plot ==
Kisenga is a composer and pianist from Marashi in Tanganyika who has spent fifteen years in London. He decides to return to his homeland to help the District Commissioner, Randall, in the work of health care.

Randall explains that an outbreak of sleeping sickness caused by the tsetse fly is moving across Tanganyika and has almost reached Marashi. He wants to transfer the population of 25,000 to a new settlement on higher ground and set fire to the bush to destroy the tsetse fly. Randall is helped by Dr. Munro.

Kisenga arrives at Marashi. His sister Saburi is engaged to a young man named Ali, an assistant at the dispensary. Kisenga meets the Chief Rafuf, who is under the control of Margoli, a witch doctor. Rafuf does not want to move.

Kisenga decides to settle in his old home and teaches music. The tsetse fly gets closer to the village, and Doctor Burton wants to do blood tests on villagers, which are opposed by Margoli.

Margoli fights the doctors, and Kisenga's father dies of malaria. Margoli casts spells against Kisenga. He falls ill but recovers when the children perform Kisenga's music. The clearing of the village begins, and the people leave for their new settlement.

== Cast ==
- Phyllis Calvert as Doctor Catherine Munro
- Eric Portman as District Commissioner Randall
- Robert Adams as Kisenga
- Orlando Martins as Magole
- Arnold Marlé as Professor Collner
- Cathleen Nesbitt as Mrs. Upjohn
- Lucius Blake as Rafi the Chief (billed as Sam Blake)
- Napoleon Florent as Kisenga's father
- Viola Thompson as Kisenga's mother
- Eseza Makumbi as Saburi, his sister
- Tunji Williams as Ali the Dispenser
- Rudolph Evans as Abram the schoolmaster
- Uriel Porter as Saidi, the headman
- Cecily Dale as Sala, his wife
- Prince Zulamkah as Chief's messenger
- James Rich as office clerk
- Kerry Richardson as technician
- George Coop as conductor of orchestra
- David Horne as concert agent
- Cyril Raymond as education officer

== Production ==
=== Development ===
The film was written by Joyce Cary who had worked in Africa as a civil servant. He and Dickinson drafted a treatment, and then in January 1943, they travelled from England to Tanganika, doing a first draft of the script. As soon as they arrived, Dickinson fell ill with malaria.

Thorold Dickinson said: "Our picture categorically insists that witchcraft does exist; that it is suggestion, supported by all the trappings of religion, and can only be defeated by counter-suggestion. It's a struggle of mind against mind. There is a terrific blood motive running through the story. Blood drips in color. The East Africans believe that blood is the life. Blood gives power. This primitive thing – this bloodlust – is really pure fascism and has got to be killed."

Esther Makumbi was the one lead actor from Africa – the rest were based in Britain. Robert Adams came to England to study law and moved into acting.

=== Shooting ===
Filming began in 1943, with eight months shooting in Tanganyika. A U-boat sank cameras and stock on the way out. Cameras were impounded, and shooting was held up with slow convoys, bad weather, a strike of lab men in Hollywood, and difficulties involved in shooting in Technicolor.

Filming in Tanganyika cost an estimated £600,000. The film had to be re-done in England. The replica of the concert hall built at Denham Film Studios was one of the largest sets ever built in England.

Filming in England started in January 1945.

The film was part of a series of movies which cost £3 million, aimed at beating Hollywood head on. The others were London Town (£700,000), Henry V (£450,000) and Caesar and Cleopatra (£1,300,000).

=== Music ===
Muir Mathieson, head of music at Denham, commissioned Arthur Bliss to compose the score. Bliss combined his own style with ethnically derived material, as he used some authentic recordings of East African music to help with this. The African influence is also evident from the use of a male chorus in the score. The film opens with a performance of Kisenga's Piano Concerto as an example of what Steve Race named "Denham Concertos" as which was performed on the soundtrack by pianist Eileen Joyce. It was extracted as a concert piece, Baraza (1946), and recorded in the same year on a Decca 78, with Mathieson conducting Joyce and the National Symphony Orchestra. Bliss liked the music and described director Thorold Dickinson as "one of the nicest people (I'd) ever come across to work with".

== Release ==
The film had its world premiere at Avalon Cinema in Dar es Salaam on 16 July 1946. It then had its London premiere in front of the King and Queen.

The film had trouble being seen in the US due to censor concerns over its depiction of blacB people. It was not released in the US until 1952.

== Reception ==
=== Box office ===
According to trade papers, the film was a "notable box office attraction" at British cinemas.

According to The Washington Post it was the 17th most popular film at the British box office in 1946

Kinematograph Weekly reported that the film was a runner-up for "biggest winner" at the box office in 1946 Britain.

=== Critical ===
The Monthly Film Bulletin wrote: "Here is a sincere piece which is still impressive, although it falls short of its promise. Directed largely in the documentary manner and with the help of the Tanganyika Government, its faults spring primarily from a mediocre script and its attempts at concessions to hackneyed film traditions. Tom Morahan is responsible for its excellent colour – alike in the bush scenes and in London. And Arthur Bliss's music gives the sound-track real distinction. But, apart from Eric Portman's District Commissioner, the acting is patchy, with Robert Adams (Kisengaj showing more conscientiousness than brilliance) and Phyllis Calvert (as a woman doctor) definitely ill at ease. Orlando Martins, a newcomer who plays Magole, should be given more opportunities in British films."

Variety wrote: "The characters themselves, flat and uninspired, aren't sufficiently exciting to justify 109 minutes on the screen. Tribal dances, burning of a dispensary by a maddened crowd, blood-letting and puncturing of bodies, swamps and rivers, beating of tom-toms, and all the paraphernalia of the jungle are conventional adjuncts to a story that doesn't begin to live but is throughout animated by good intentions."

Leslie Halliwell wrote "Ernest but totally unpersuasive semi-documentary shot in unconvincing sets and garish colour."

In British Sound Films: The Studio Years 1928–1959 David Quinlan rated the film as "average", writing: "Sincerely told, could do with a bit more guts."

BFI Screenonline said the film was "a creditable effort to tell an African story from the point of view of an African. The story only makes sense if we identify with Kisenga's dilemmas. Only he can resolve a situation in which the African and the European worldviews are at loggerheads, and he is prepared to give up his life in the struggle. The film gives us unusually authentic-seeming pictures of village life and ritual and invests the people with a certain dignity and sensibility, even if ultimately they prefer superstition and fear to science. The photography is slow-moving and beautifully composed; African faces appear on screen distinct with emotion and individuality."

Martin Scorsese, an admirer of Dickinson, said: "He didn't make many films, but each is a fascinating project. Even when the movie doesn't work, like Men of Two Worlds or The Prime Minister, you're struck by the choice of subject matter, by the vivacity of the film-making, and by the intelligence of the approach."
