= Bristol Black Writers Group =

UK writers' organization

The Bristol Black Writers group was a collective of poets and writers, co-founded by writer Bertel Martin in the late 1980s. The group was based at the Kuumba Centre in St Pauls, Bristol in England. Bristol Black Writers published a monthly newsletter and held performance groups and workshops that were influential to the development of the career of many British poets and spoken word artists of color. Members included Bertel Martin, Edson Burton, Ros Martin, Rob Mitchell, Restee Kabi, Miles Chambers, and Doreen Baidoo.

== Founding ==
Martin co-founded the group in 1986 after he attended a Black writers meeting in Lumb Bank, where he met Bristol writers Jean White, Elaine Brissett, and Connie Jones, along with Cheryl Martin and Lemn Sissay. The session instructors were Fred D'Aguiar and Jean "Binta" Breeze.

Sissay and Martin later went on to organize a Black Writers’ exchange in 1988 between the cities of Bristol and Manchester, where participants visited both cities, discussed issues faced by Black writers, and conducted multiple performances at local venues.

These early performances reinforced the need for Bristol Black Writers to establish their identity around poetry inside of the growing local performance art scene. Many of the Bristol Black Writers would later participate in the Bristol Poetry Slam, organized by Glenn Carmichael.

In May 1991, Lilleith Morrison completed a short film, Black 'n' Write, featuring men and women from the Bristol Black Writers Group, including both footage of poetry performances and interviews.

== Collaborations ==
Writer Edson Burton was one of the members of the Bristol Black Writers who felt that the Poetry Slam did not take the craft seriously enough or offer sufficient critique. By 1994, the Bristol Black Writers were criticized for not engaging much with the Slam, as Edson and other poets did not wish to constantly be in the minority of writers, having to explain specific cultural elements and experience to the audiences. Miles Chambers, Bristol City Poet Laureate, noted the “whiteness” of the Poetry Slam at the time. In 1998, Bristol Black Writers collaborated with artist Andrea Baum for Speaking between the lines – a Poetic play written with Restee Kabi from the Bristol Black Writers group and performed at Spike Island in Bristol.

In 1999, the group participated in the first Bristol International Poetry Festival, and was featured in its program.

The Bristol Black Writers group published an anthology, The reality is..., in 1999 with writing from poets Peter Baidoo, Inez Aponte, Rob Mitchell, Edson Burton, Ralph Hoyte, Miles Chambers, Doreen Baidoo, Jamila Yousaf (Martin), Kamaljit Poonia and Ros Martin.

At the start of the 21st Century, the spoken word scene attempted to be more inclusive and British poets of color sought to partner with US poets. Bristol Black Writers were featured in Say it Loud and partnered with visiting poets to run poetry workshops at schools and centers for juvenile criminal offenders.

In 2002, the group produced Songs for Saartje, dedicated to Saartje Baartman, featuring Ros Martin.

In March 2006, Miles Chambers, of Bristol Black Writers' Group, held a workshop in which he demonstrated how to find inspiration and gave general writing advice to year seven and eight pupils at Kelsey Park Sports College, in Manor Way, Beckenham.

In 2011, Edson Burton, co-founder of the writing group, produced Seasoned, a theatrical piece based upon his collection of poetry by the same name. The history of production of Seasoned has been examined as an example of how culture operates in a context of shifting deinstitutionalized production to affect the expression of Black diasporic experience in poetry and theatre. The creation of Seasoned as a recognizable cultural product was heavily dependent on the possibilities of self-publishing, self-broadcasting, and workshopping, through which it was transformed as a work.

By 2012, the spoken word scene in Bristol was burgeoning from the inspiration from rap, hip-hop, YouTube poetry, and the festival scene. Bertel Martin of the Bristol Black Writers co-founded Word of Mouth in Totterdown as a space to exchange ideas and perform verse, prose and musical acts in the style of Dylan Thomas.

As of 2019, the writing group as an entity was defunct.

== Cultural and literary influences ==
Caryl Phillips’ and Edson Burton’s careers in creative writing started with their participation in the Bristol Black Writers group.

Poet Shagufta Iqbal was a member of the Bristol Black Writers and a mentee of Bertel Martin. She saw the spoken word scene in 2005 as ‘very male and very white’ and went on to create Kiota, a networking and creative space for poets and women of color. Iqbal reflects on the significance of the Bristol Black Writers upon her career:

It was Bristol Black Writers that gave me the incentive, encouragement, and confidence to imagine myself as a poet - without which I would not have found this love as quickly as I did. I owe Kuumba and the Bristol Black Writers an immense gratitude for providing an environment that nourished my curiosity about poetry.

== Publications ==
- Bristol Black Writers' Group (1999). The reality is - : the Bristol Black Writers anthology. [Bristol]: [Bristol Black Writers Group]. ISBN 0-9536138-0-1. OCLC 59575383.

== Archives ==
Material from the Bristol Black Writers Group and its members are held in various collections at Bristol Archives including:

- Black n' Write, 1991 - Reference number BROFA/0118 Video by Lilleith Morrison relating to the Bristol Black Writers group and poetry performances.
- Collection of local and national black publications, 1986 - 1990 Reference number 43517
- Records of Kuumba, Bwerani and Inkworks, 1970s – 2007 Reference number 43627
- Records of the Bristol Black Archives Partnership, 2005 – 2009 Reference number 43765
- Leaflet advertising Bristol International Poetry Festival, programme for Saturday and Sunday, including Bristol Black Writers, 4 Sep 1999 Reference number 43515/3/PM/2
