= James Tobin (planter) =

English sugar planter and pro-slavery campaigner

James Tobin (1736/7–1817) was a prominent merchant and planter based in Nevis. During his life, he became one of the most prominent proslavery activists from the West Indies.

== Life ==
Tobin was born in London, the son of James Tobin Sr. of Nevis, identified tentatively in the ODNB with the sea captain James Tobin (1698–1770), as given in Caribbeana. Educated at Westminster School, he took articles as a solicitor. After a period in Nevis, he returned in 1784 to Bristol. He was in business there, with John Pretor Pinney, and advocated for the planters' point of view on the abolitionist movement. He was a member of the Bristol West India Association.

Tobin travelled first to Nevis in 1758, to work in the family plantation business, at Stoney Grove Estate. From 1760 to 1782 he was there at least three times. He went back there in 1808. In 1817, the year of his death, there were 213 enslaved people on the Stoney Grove plantation.

In the end Tobin quarrelled with the Pinney family. He died in Bristol, on 6 October 1817.

== Works ==
Tobin was one of a group of writers who defended the existing institution of slavery, based on experience in the Caribbean, that included also Samuel Estwick, Edward Long, Richard Nisbet who published Slavery not Forbidden by Scripture (1773), and Philip Thicknesse. He was drawn into controversy by the views of James Ramsay, expressed in An Essay on the Treatment and Conversion of African Slaves in the British Sugar Colonies of 1784; and published a number of works:

- Cursory Remarks upon the Reverend Mr. Ramsay's Essay on the Treatment and Conversion of African Slaves in the Sugar Colonies (1785). Tobin deployed arguments including the deprivations found in English rural life, compared to an idealised West Indian plantation drawing on the novels of Henry Mackenzie and Sarah Scott. He cited the pro-slavery work of Rev. Robert Robertson from earlier in the century, and followed racial purity arguments from Long.
- Short Rejoinder to the Reverend Mr. Ramsay's Reply (1787). Tobin pointed out the Society for the Propagation of the Gospel in Foreign Parts as owner of a Barbados sugar plantation that used slave labour.

Tobin was addressed personally by Ramsay in A Letter to James Tobin, Esq., late member of His Majesty's Council in the island of Nevis (1787). He replied in:

- A Farewel Address to the Rev. Mr. James Ramsay (1788)

The 1786 Essay on Slavery and Commerce of the Human Species by Thomas Clarkson deals with Tobin as the "Cursory Remarker". In 1787, Ottobah Cugoano responded to a number of authors defending enslavement, including Tobin, in Thoughts and Sentiments on the Evil and Wicked Traffic of the Slavery and Commerce of the Human Species. Olaudah Equiano replied to Tobin in 1788, in The Public Advertiser, attacking two of his pamphlets, and also a related book from 1786 by Gordon Turnbull. Hector Macneill wrote positively about Tobin's Cursory Remarks in his Observations on the Treatment of the Negroes in Jamaica (1788).

In February 1790 Tobin gave evidence to a parliamentary committee on the slave trade. A later work was A Plain Man's Thoughts on the present Price of Sugar (1792). In that year a bill to abolish the slave trade was defeated in the House of Commons.

== Family ==
Tobin married in 1766 Elizabeth Webbe, daughter of George Webbe, a Nevis planter. Living until 1777 in Salisbury, they had eight children: James Webbe, George, Henry Hope, John, Elizabeth, Charles Meadows, Joseph Webbe, and Frances. Elizabeth married John Cobham of Barbados, and Frances Robert Bush of Clifton. In a marriage of first cousins, George Webbe Tobin, son of George, married Susannah Cobham, daughter of Elizabeth.

Through his son, Joseph Webbe, Tobin is the four times great grandfather of astronomer William Tobin.
