= Orlando Martins =

Nigerian actor (1899–1985)

- Born: Emmanuel Alhandu Martins; 8 December 1899; Lagos, Nigeria
- Died: 25 September 1985 (aged 85); Lagos, Nigeria
- Other names: Pa Orlando Martins (Epega family great-uncle) "Black Butcher Johnson"
- Occupations: Film and stage actor
- Years active: 1931–71
- Relatives: Ros Martin (niece)

Orlando Martins (8 December 1899 – 25 September 1985) was a pioneering Yoruba Nigerian film and stage actor. In the late 1940s, he was one of Britain's most prominent and leading black actors, and in a poll conducted in 1947, he was listed among Britain's top 15 favourite actors.

== Life ==
He was born as Emmanuel Alhandu Martins at Okesuna Street, Lagos, Nigeria, to a civil servant father with roots in Brazil and a Nigerian mother. Martins was related to the Benjamin Epega family. In 1913, he was enrolled in Eko Boys High School but dropped out.

During World War I, he served as a stoker on the RMS Mauretania to avenge German cruelty to his family. Following the end of the war, he moved to London; on arrival in 1919, he had no source of income and had to look for ways to earn money. Around the same time, the Lyceum Theatre was looking for "supers" at the rate of three shillings per day. Martins joined the theatre and from there took on various theatre jobs to survive. In 1923, Sanger's Circus wanted to have someone to display pythons, Martins took the part, starting his performing career in the circus. He also worked as a wrestler (known as "Black Butcher Johnson").

== Career ==
In 1920, Martins was an acting extra with the Diaghilev ballet company, and was on the tour with the British company of Show Boat as a professional singer. He was an extra in silent films, having made his debut in If Youth But Knew (1926). In the 1930s he went into acting on the London stage, playing Boukman in Toussaint Louverture: The Story of the Only Successful Slave Revolt in History, a 1936 drama by C. L. R. James that starred African-American actor Paul Robeson, with whom Martins had featured in the 1935 film Sanders of the River.

After the war, Martins had film roles in The Man from Morocco (1945) and in Men of Two Worlds (1946), alongside Robert Adams, becoming a sought-after character actor who was described by Peter Noble in 1948 as "a tall, powerful figure of a man with a deep bass voice, friendly, hospitable and with a grand sense of humour." Noble went on to say of Martins: "He is keenly interested in the foundation of a Negro Theatre in London. As he points out: 'If this ever comes into being it will mean not only that Negro talent in every theatre can be shown to the world, but a continuity of employment for this talent which is now going sadly to waste.'"

He appears in the 1949 film The Hasty Heart (starring Ronald Reagan and Patricia Neal), playing the African soldier Blossom, which role Martins also undertook in the stage production. In the 1950s he made other appearances on the London stage, including in adaptations of Cry, the Beloved Country (Trafalgar Square Theatre, 1954), and The Member of the Wedding (Royal Court Theatre, 1957), before returning to Lagos in 1959. He subsequently took roles in such films as Killers of Kilimanjaro (1960), Call Me Bwana (1963), Mister Moses (1965), and Kongi's Harvest (1970, Wole Soyinka's adaptation of his play of the same name).

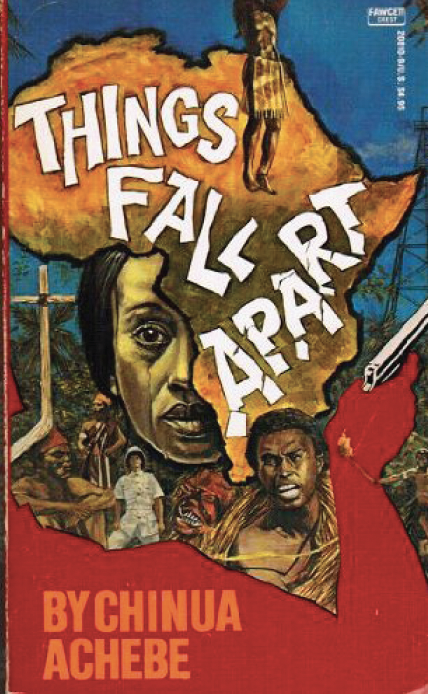
Cover of Things Fall Apart (1985) | Collage of film stills by Stephen Goldblatt

His final film role was the character of Obierika in the film adaptation of Chinua Achebe's 1958 debut novel Things Fall Apart, which was produced in Nigeria in 1970. The executive producer was Francis Oladele, who established in 1965 Calpenny-Nigeria Films Limited – the first private film production company in Nigeria - with an intent to provide a platform for artistic expression in a more profound way. In his essay "Why 'Things Fall Apart' is still a very relevant Black film till this day", Lagos-based contemporary artist Mallam Mudi Yahaya describes the complex background of the production.

== Death and legacy ==
Martins died in 1985 at the age of 85 in Lagos, where he was buried at Ikoyi Cemetery.

He is the subject of a 1983 book by Takiu Folami, entitled Orlando Martins, the Legend: an intimate biography of the first world acclaimed African film actor.

Bristol-based playwright Ros Martin has been researching and developing material in connection with Martins, her great-uncle.

== Filmography ==
Year	Title	Role	Notes
1935	Sanders of the River	Klova	Uncredited
1937	The Green Cockatoo		Uncredited
1945	The Man from Morocco	Jeremiah	
1946	Men of Two Worlds	Magole	
1946	Dumb Dora Discovers Tobacco		
1947	The End of the River	Harrigan	
1948	Good-Time Girl	Kolly	
1949	The Hasty Heart	Blossom	
1951	Where No Vultures Fly	M'Kwongwi	
1953	The Heart of the Matter	Rev. Clay	Uncredited
1954	West of Zanzibar	M'Kwongwi	
1955	Simba	Headman	
1956	Safari	Jerusalem	
1957	Abandon Ship	Sam Holly	
1957	Tarzan and the Lost Safari	Chief Ogonooro	
1958	The Naked Earth	Tribesman, pall bearer	
1959	Sapphire	Barman	
1959	The Nun's Story	Kalulu	
1960	Killers of Kilimanjaro	Chief	
1963	Sammy Going South	Abu Lubaba	
1963	Call Me Bwana	Chief	
1965	Mister Moses	Chief	
1970	Kongi's Harvest	Dr. Gbenga	
1971	Things Fall Apart	Obierika	(final film role)
