= George Tobin (Royal Navy officer) =

Royal Navy officer and artist (1768–1838)

Rear-Admiral George Tobin
- Born: 13 December 1768; Salisbury, England
- Died: 10 April 1838 (aged 69); Teignmouth, England
- Military career
- Allegiance: Great Britain; United Kingdom
- Branch: Royal Navy
- Rank: Rear admiral
- Commands: HMS Northumberland; HMS Princess Charlotte
- Conflicts: French Revolutionary Wars; Napoleonic Wars

Rear-Admiral George Tobin (13 December 1768 – 10 April 1838) was a Royal Navy officer and artist.

== Early life ==
The second son of James Tobin of Nevis in the West Indies, and his wife Elizabeth Webbe, he was elder brother of John Tobin and James Webbe Tobin. He was born in England at Salisbury on 13 December 1768, and studied at King Edward VI School, Southampton. He entered the navy in 1780 on board HMS Namur, in which he later went out to the West Indies, being present at the Battle of the Saintes during April 1782.

After the peace of 1783 Tobin was for some time in: HMS Bombay Castle, guardship at Plymouth; HMS Leander on the Halifax, Nova Scotia station, and in HMS Assistance. From 1788 to 1790 he made a voyage in Sulivan, a ship of the East India Company. On his return he was for a few weeks on board HMS Tremendous during the Nootka Crisis, and on 22 November he was made a lieutenant.

== Lieutenant ==
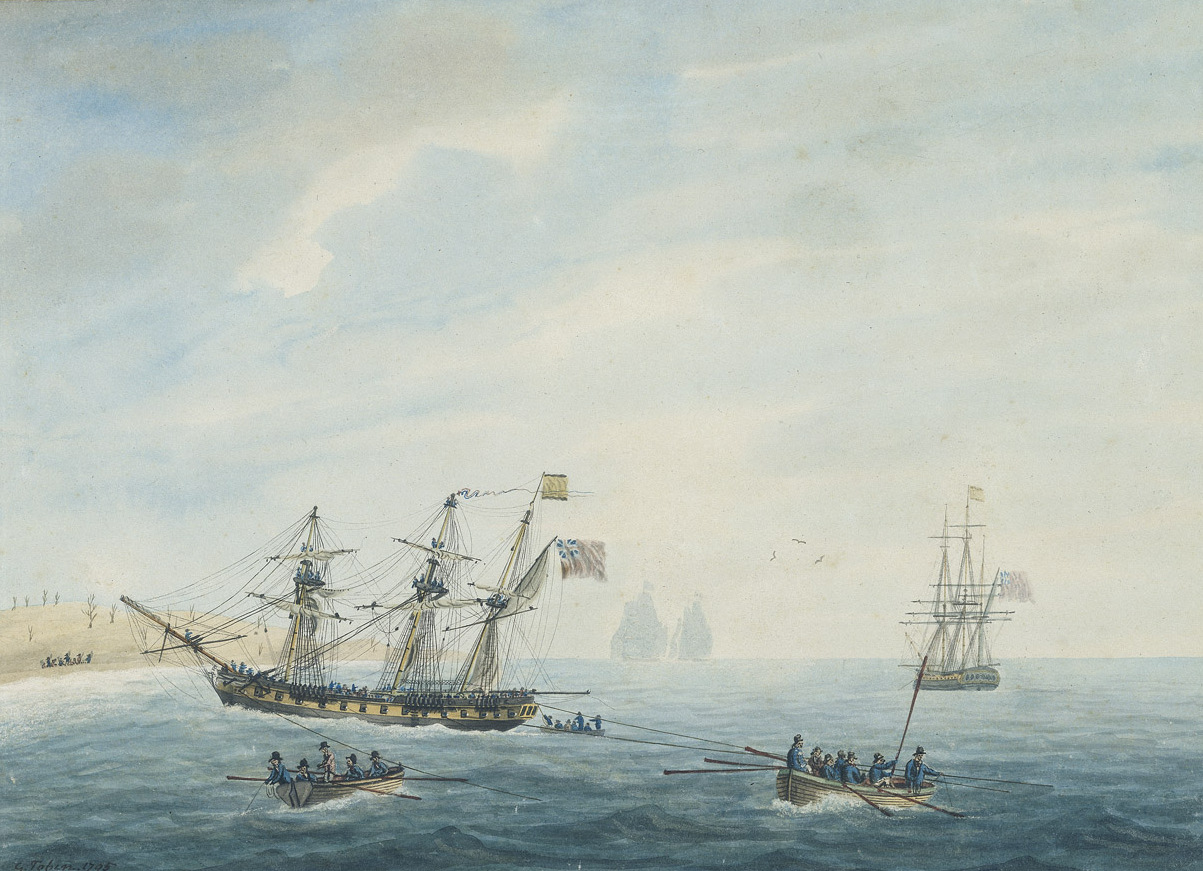
Illustration by Tobin of Thetis run aground near Currituck Inlet, North Carolina on 23 Dec 1794

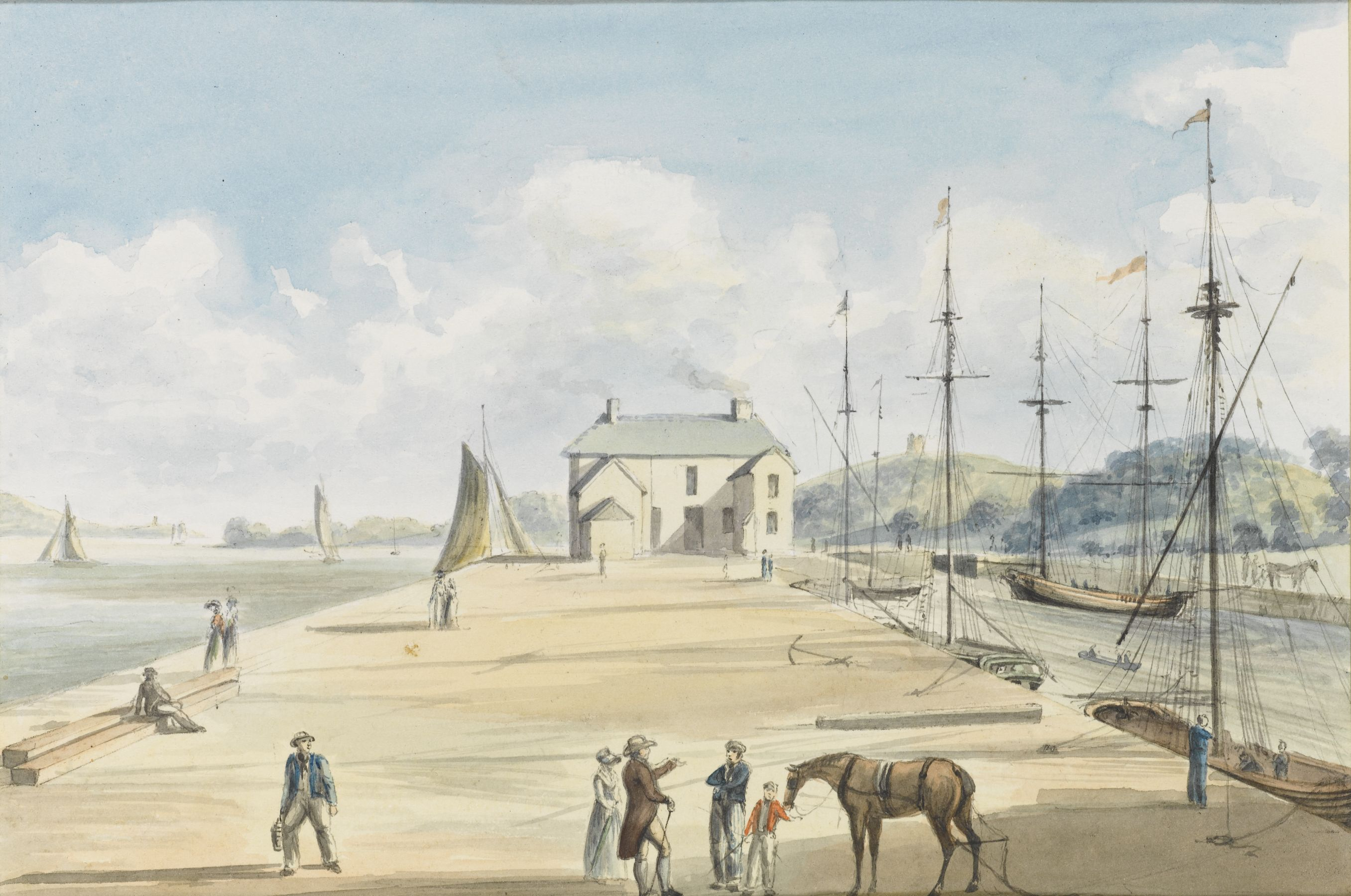
'Turf Entrance to Exeter Canal, 1829'. Watercolour painting by Tobin in the Royal Albert Memorial Museum's collection (31/1938/1)

During 1791–1793 Tobin was in HMS Providence, Captain William Bligh, on its voyage to Tahiti and the West Indies. He kept an illustrated journal, covering in particular Tahiti and Tasmania. It is now in the State Library of New South Wales. On his return to England Tobin learned that by his absence he had avoided being appointed third lieutenant of HMS Agamemnon, captain Horatio Nelson: Nelson through his wife was connected with Tobin's family. He was instead appointed second lieutenant of the frigate HMS Thetis, captain Alexander Cochrane, which he considered a better outcome. Nelson, however, regretted it, writing of Tobin, on 12 July 1797, "The time is past for doing anything for him. Had he been with me, he would long since have been a captain, and I should have liked it, as being most exceedingly pleased with him."

== Captain ==
Tobin was made a commander on 12 July 1798. He was advanced to the rank of captain in the major promotion of the Peace of Amiens, 29 April 1802; and in September 1804 was appointed to HMS Northumberland. It was the flagship of his old chief Cochrane, off Ferrol and then in the West Indies. In September 1805 Tobin was moved into HMS Princess Charlotte, a 38-gun frigate, and in her, off Tobago, captured the French corvette Cyane.

After much convoy service Tobin, still in the same frigate, renamed HMS Andromache in 1812, co-operated during 1813–14 with the army in Peninsular War operations in the north of Spain and the west of France. In July 1814 Andromache was paid off, and Tobin had no further service at sea.

== Retirement and death ==
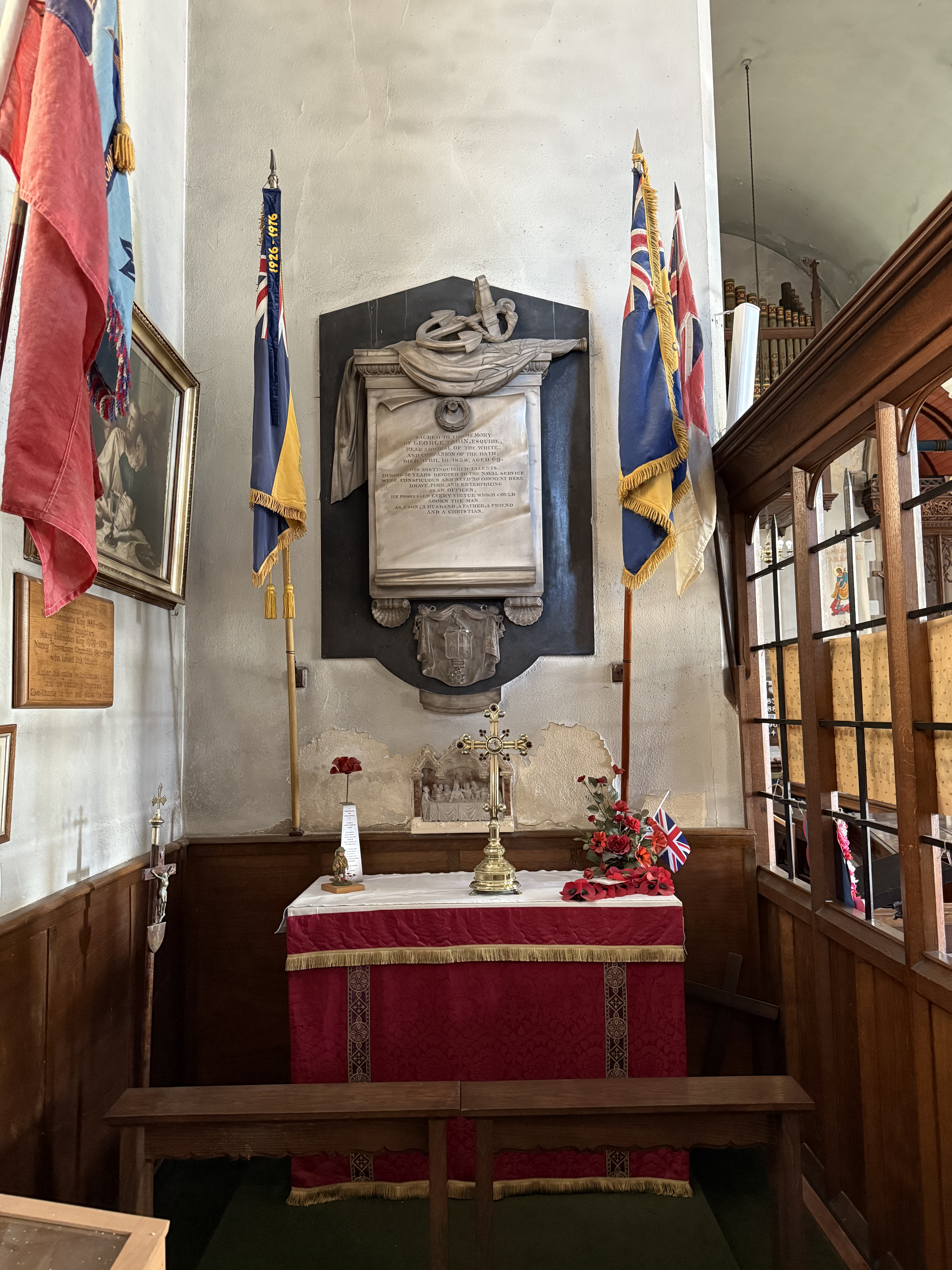
Memorial in St Michael's Church, Teignmouth

On 8 December 1815 Tobin was nominated a C.B. He became a rear-admiral on 10 January 1837, and died at Teignmouth on 10 April 1838.

== Family ==
Tobin married, in 1804, Dorothy, daughter of Captain Gordon Skelly of the navy, widow of Major William Duff of the 26th Regiment. They had one son and one daughter.
