= Dinah Black =

- Years active: 1647–67

Dinah Black, also known as Dinah the Moor and Dinah the Black, was a Black woman who lived in the English city of Bristol during the 17th century and was baptised as a Christian. Though historical information on her life is scarce, records show that she visited Baptist spiritualist Sarah Wight in London in 1647 and appeared in a case heard by the Bristol Court of Aldermen in July 1667 after escaping from a ship which was supposed to transport her to a plantation overseas.

== Life ==
In 1647, a maid born outside England, referred to as Dinah the Black, visited the Baptist spiritualist Sarah Wight in London and asked her for advice. As she explained to Wight, "I am often tempted against my life: I am not as others are, I do not look so as others do."

Twenty years later, Dinah appeared in a case before the Bristol Court of Aldermen in July 1667; having worked as a servant in the home of Dorothy Smith in Bristol, she was now to be put on a ship and be transported to a plantation overseas, but managed to escape. The aldermen ruled that since Dorothy Smith did not wish to take her back, she should be free to earn her living until the next quarter sessions. It is unknown what happened to her after this.

== Legacy ==
Dinah's story has been described as "the most revealing of Bristol's black records." She was included in the 2018 book The Women Who Built Bristol, and her imagined life story has been included on a BBC Black History Month programme. website.
