= Frances Coker =

Freed slave and domestic servant (1767–1820)

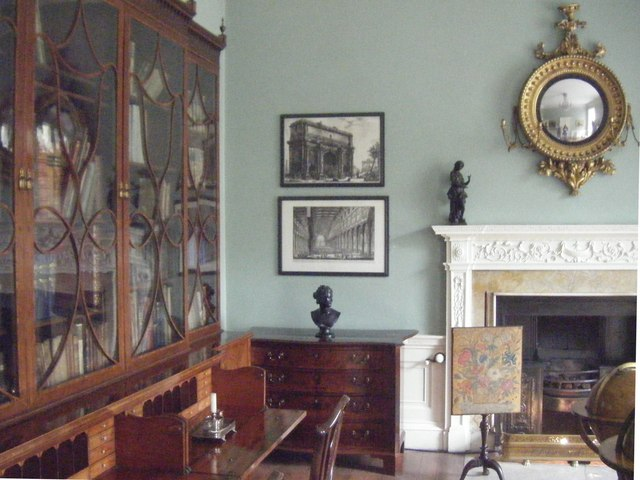
- The library at 7 Great George Street (now the Georgian House Museum) in 2009
- Born: 26 August 1767; Nevis
- Died: 12 April 1820 (aged 52); Bristol, England
- Other name: Fanny
- Occupation: House servant
- Employer: John Pinney
- Known for: Freed enslaved person who lived in Bristol
- Parent(s): Black Polly and William Coker

Frances Coker (26 August 1767 – 12 April 1820) was born enslaved on Nevis. She was a domestic servant to John and Jane Pinney of Nevis in the West Indies and Bristol, England. She was manumitted (freed) in 1778, after which she continued to work for the Pinney family as a free woman. In Bristol, she lived at 7 Great George Street, the Pinneys' house (now The Georgian House Museum). As Jane Pinney's maidservant Coker travelled widely in England as well as revisiting her family in Nevis.

== Early life on Nevis ==
Frances Coker was born on 26 August 1767 on John Pinney's Mountravers estate, Nevis. She was born into slavery, as her mother was an enslaved woman named Black Polly. Black Polly was probably enslaved in Nigeria aged about twelve, and had been brought to the island of Nevis from St Kitts by John Pinney, who had purchased her together with eight other male children. Black Polly worked in the Pinneys' house as a seamstress, so Coker was brought up in that household.

The man said to have been her father was William Coker, Pinney's plantation manager. He was married to a woman called Frances, after whom it is assumed Fanny was named, even though she was not her mother. Because Coker had a mother of African descent and a White father, she was known by the historical racial classification as a "mulatto". William Coker's family were related to the Pinney family through Jane Pinney, and thus Fanny Coker was related to the Pinney family as a cousin by marriage.

Coker was baptised when at the age of three, on 30 June 1770 in the Anglican church on Nevis, the only person from the Mountravers estate known to have been baptised in the 18th century. She was educated together with two of Pinney's children. Their teacher, Mary Keep, may have also instructed Coker in domestic duties and those of a maidservant. Coker was thirteen years old when she finished her schooling, and it is likely that was when she started working as a servant.

Coker was manumitted on 15 September 1778 by John Pinney. She was the first person whom he manumitted, and he did not free anyone else for another ten years. She was one of the very few enslaved people whom Pinney freed for reasons other than old age or illness.

After she was manumitted, Coker was paid a wage and continued in service for the Pinney family in Nevis as Jane Pinney's maid. In 1783, the Pinney family returned to England, taking with them two servants: Coker was one and the other was Pero Jones, an enslaved man (after whom Pero's Bridge in Bristol is named). Coker had to leave her mother behind in Nevis, as well as her half-sister Hetty, and half-brother Billy Jones (whose father was said to have been John Pinney).

== Life in England ==
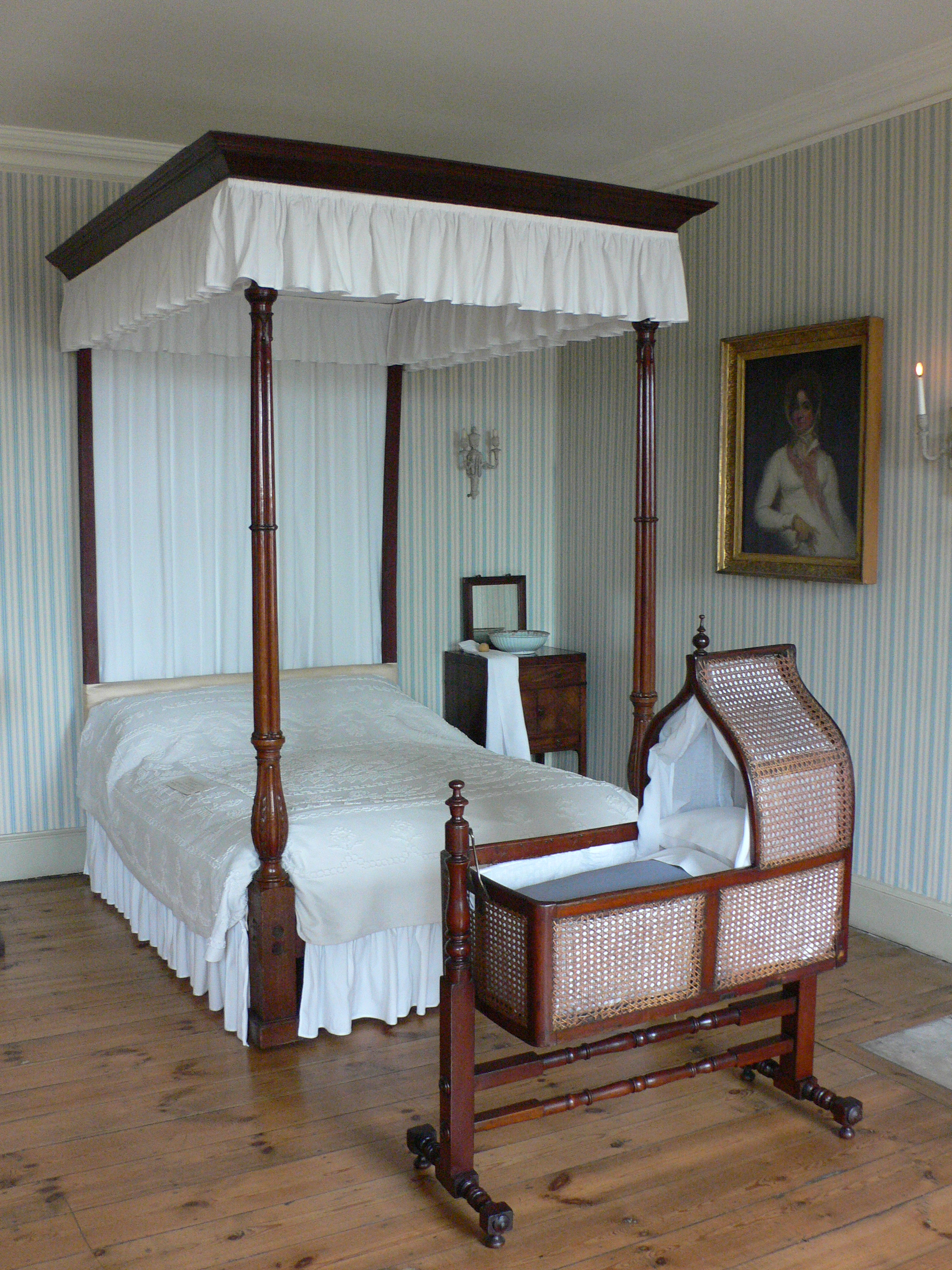
Bedroom at the Georgian House, Bristol. in 2008

On arrival in England in 1783, Coker and the Pinney household stayed first in London before visiting her presumed father, William Coker, at Woodcuts (his home in Dorset), and then travelling onto Bristol.

In Bristol, Coker joined the Broadmead Baptist Church. The record from 10 March 1789 reads: "Frances Coker the descd.t of African ancestors, gave a most intelligent and pleasing acc.t of the work of God upon her soul, and was accepted as a candidate for Baptism." The leaders of the Broadmead Baptist Church were active in the abolition movement in Bristol, and Eickelmann says: "In choosing the Baptists Fanny Coker [also] displayed religious maturity. She made a conscious choice not to attend the nearby Anglican parish church of St Augustine the Less but instead committed herself to an alternative Protestant belief system."

Later in 1789, Jane Pinney decided to revisit Nevis, but Coker refused to go with her; she agreed only after she was threatened with being dismissed. On her visit, Coker saw for the first time her five-year-old half-brother Cubbenna, and her two-year-old half-sister Molly. As a free woman Coker could have chosen to remain on Nevis, but decided to return to Bristol with the Pinneys. Throughout her life Coker retained her contacts with Nevis: she wrote letters, sent presents and goods for her mother to trade, as well as cooper's equipment to her half-brother Billey.

Coker's duties included sewing and mending as well as looking after the Pinney's children when they were young. As Mrs Pinney's personal maid, Coker would have had to attend her at all times, carrying out a range of duties including laying out and looking after her clothes, packing for trips away, reading aloud (Coker was literate), and accompanying her on visits (Jane Pinney was an energetic traveller).

In 1791, the household moved from rented accommodation at 5 Park Street to the new house that Pinney had had built for him at 7 Great George Street (now The Georgian House Museum). Around 1791, Pinney had dismissed all their servants other than Pero and Coker and had to employ new staff. Both Coker and Pero would have worked with dozens of different people over their years in the Pinney household.

John Pinney also had houses called Racedown in Broadwindsor, Dorset and Somerton Erleigh in Somerton, Somerset, and as Jane Pinney's constant companion, Coker accompanied her to their country houses, as well as to places such as Exmouth, Weymouth and London. Occasionally Coker was in charge of looking after Racedown and, whilst enjoying greater freedom on her own, she would have had to adjust to a quiet, rural life. On long trips, she took with her the one truly private item all servants possessed: a lockable trunk for personal belongings.

According to John Pinney, Fanny Coker had been brought up by Mrs Pinney "with great Tenderness, and we have never considered her in the light of a menial servant, but as one who had a claim to our protection and support". It is assumed that she had friends among the many people of African and Caribbean descent from Nevis who came to England as servants, and she enjoyed the company of the freed enslaved women Kate Coker and Polly Weekes on their visits to Bristol in 1785 and 1810–11 respectively.

Coker was paid a regular wage – £10 a year in 1793 and £12 in about 1800. As early as 1802, John Pinney invested money on her behalf, and on his death in 1818 he left her an annuity, provided she remained in his widow's service: she was to get the dividends on £1,000 worth of consols, invested at three per cent. Coker had also saved and made her own investments, and so had an income in addition to her annuity and wages, which by this time had risen to £26 a year.

== Death ==
After a short illness, Coker died in Bristol on 12 April 1820. In writing of her death, Jane Pinney said: "You no doubt were sorry to hear of poor Fanny’s death. She died as she lived a good Christian."

In 1818, Coker had made a will in which she bequeathed her "dear mother Polly in the island of Nevis thirty pounds", other relatives and friends were bequeathed money and possessions, and to the Baptist Missionary Society she gave £5; her best tea chest was bequeathed to her fellow servant Ann Seymour.

She was buried on 17 April 1820 in the Baptist Burial Ground in Redcross Street, Bristol. According to the Baptist records, she had "lived honourably and died comfortably". In 1926, her remains were moved with many others from the Baptist Burial Ground to Greenbank Cemetery, Bristol, where a memorial marks the reinterment.

== Legacy ==
In 2017, Bristol based director and playwright Ros Martin directed the Daughters of Igbo Woman project in response to Fanny Coker's life. The project included a trilogy of films shot in Nigeria, Nevis and England, and a memorial tribute to Coker at Greenbank cemetery on 26 August 2017. In the work, Martin gives Fanny Coker, her mother and grandmother (of whom there is no record) imagined African Igbo names 'Fumnanya', 'Adaeze', and 'Ojiugo'. Martin said of the work: '[it] resurrects a memory of each woman’s invisible history in their landscape and creatively re-contextualises these in the Bristol landscape. Us, African women writers from three continents are evoking ancestor’s voices in symbolic reconnecting and honoring of ancestral spirits who endured forced migration, separation & loss; adapting and surviving.'
