= Pero's Bridge =

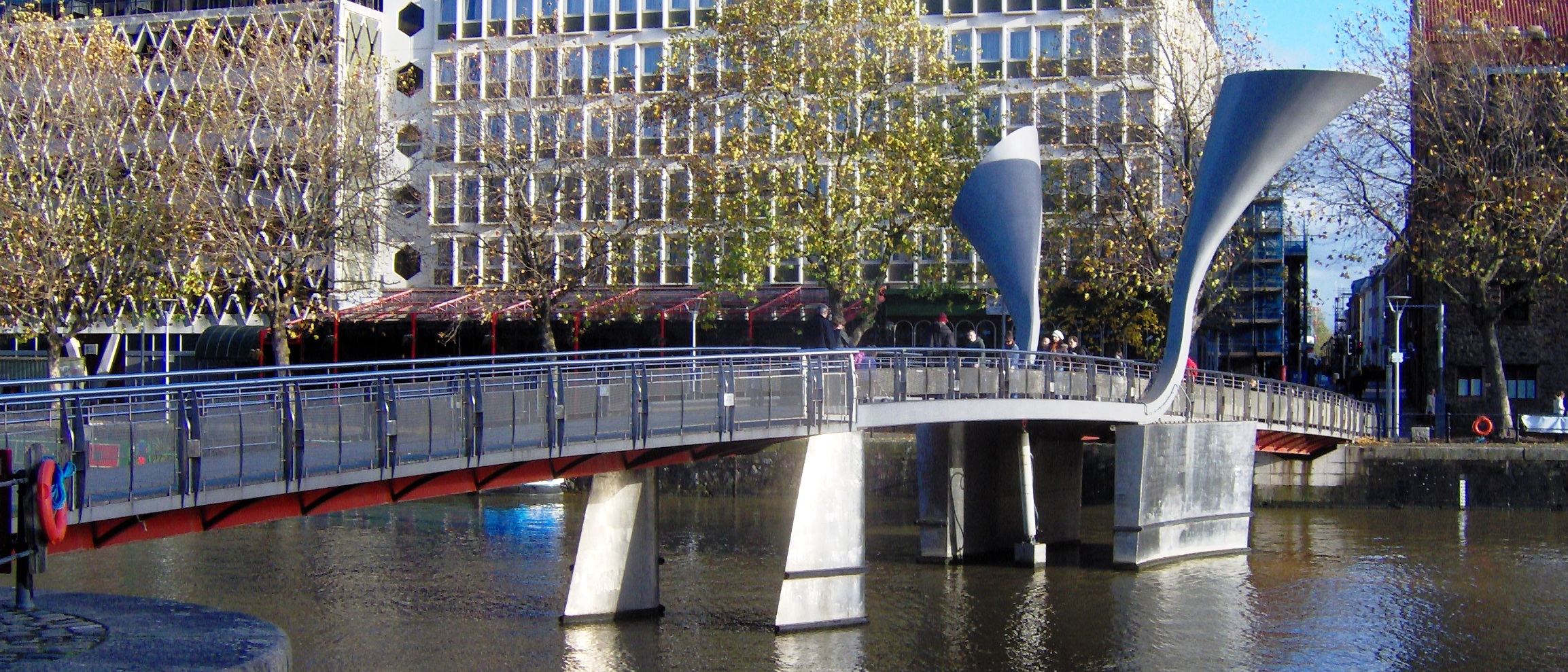
- Coordinates: 51.4501°N 2.5979°W
- Carries: Pedestrian
- Crosses: St Augustine's Reach in Bristol Harbour
- Locale: Bristol, England
- Maintained by: Bristol City Council

Characteristics
- Design: bascule bridge
- Longest span: 11 m (36 ft)
- Clearance below: 3.3 m (11 ft)

History
- Opened: 1999
- Closed: August 2026 (Temporarily)

Location
- Interactive map of Pero's Bridge

Pero's Bridge (grid reference ST585726) is a pedestrian bascule bridge that spans St Augustine's Reach in Bristol Harbour, Bristol, England. It links Queen Square and Millennium Square. Since 2026, the bridge has been closed due to a malfunction and subsequent partial collapse.

== Structure ==
The bridge is composed of three spans; the two outer ones are fixed and the central section can be raised to provide a navigation channel in the harbour. The most distinctive features of the bridge are the pair of horn-shaped sculptures which act as counterweights for the lifting section, leading it to be commonly known as the Horned Bridge or Shrek's Bridge as the counterweights resemble the ears of the animated star of the eponymous film.

== Pero ==
The bridge is named after the Pero Jones who lived from around 1753 to 1798, arriving in Bristol from the Caribbean Island of Nevis in 1783. He was enslaved by merchant John Pinney (1740–1818) who lived at 7 Great George Street. Pinney also brought his wife's maid with him, Frances Coker, who had also been born a slave, but Pinney had freed her in 1778.

== History ==
The bridge was designed by the Irish artist Eilis O'Connell, in conjunction with Ove Arup & Partners engineers. It was formally opened in 1999 by Paul Boateng MP, then a Home Office minister. The name of the bridge was attacked by then Liberal Democrat councillor Stephen Williams. He condemned the decision as "gesture politics", instead wanting a statue or permanent memorial to remember Bristol's role in the slave trade. Eilis O'Connell commented "The council can call it what they want, but Pero's Bridge sounds a bit political." People began to attach padlocks to the bridge as a sign of affection for each other.

In July 2025 an inspection found "major structural issues" with the bridge, which led to the introduction of a 1 tonne weight limit and a "no lift notice" being placed on the bridge. As of September 2025 these restrictions were still in place, with Bristol City Council seeking to re-allocate £200,000 of funds to repairing the bridge in addition to removing nearly 3 tonnes of "love locks" from the bridge.

Pero's Bridge following the malfunction. Ropes tied to the harbour wall have been added to hold it in place

Pero's Bridge following its collapse on 31 October 2026

During a routine test of the bridge's opening mechanism on the morning of 13 August 2026 the bridge suffered a structural malfunction, causing the central section of the bridge to drop suddenly and become misaligned with the rest of the bridge. As a result of the incident, the bridge has been closed until further notice for both pedestrians and boats, with Bristol Ferry Boats having to close the landing at the Cascade Steps at the end of St Augustine's Reach. The bridge is to be removed for repair and refurbishment and Bristol City aim to reinstate it by Spring 2027.

On the night of 31 October 2026, Pero's Bridge collapsed further with part of the walkway falling into the river.

== Dimensions ==
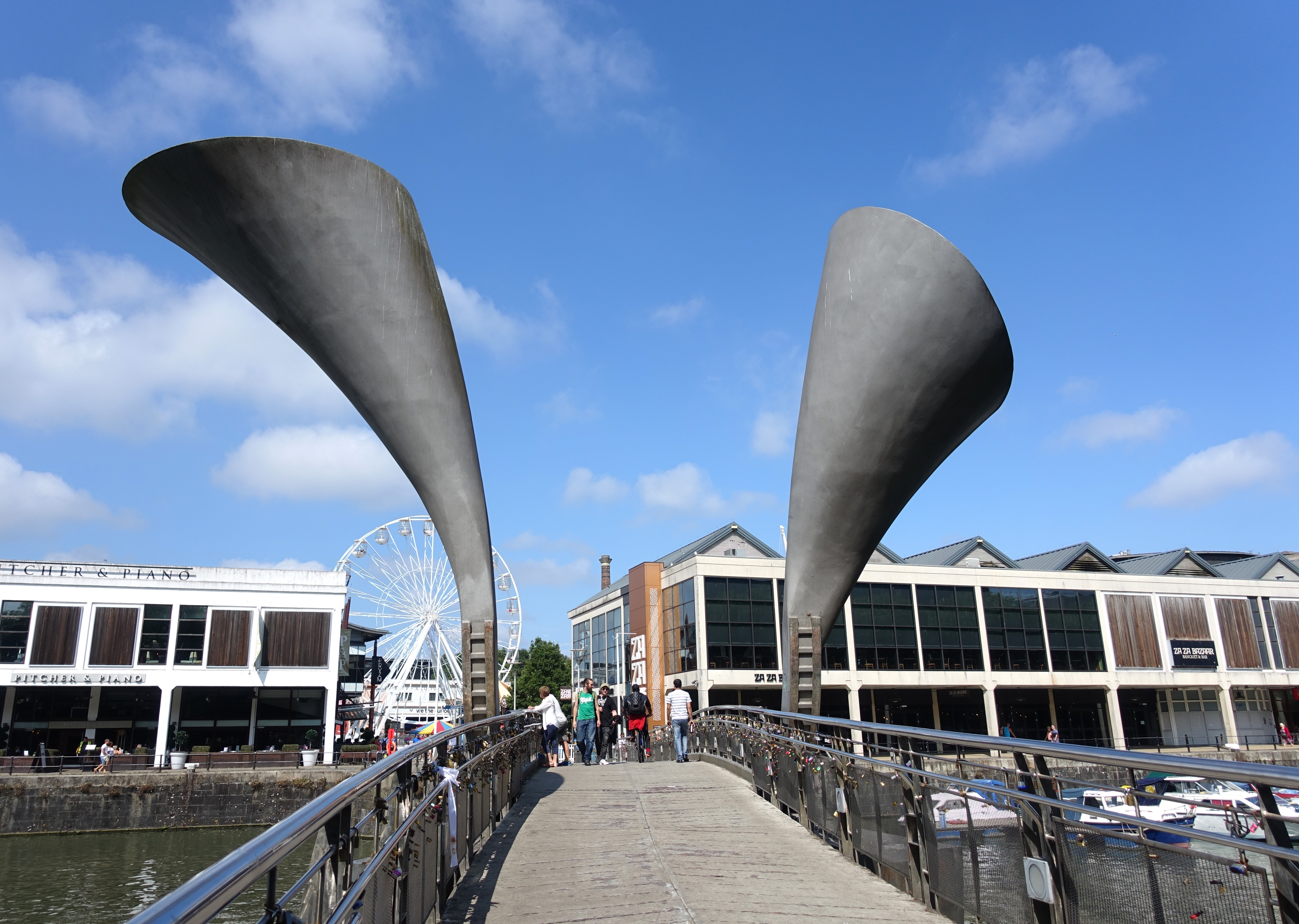
Close up of the horn-shaped counterweights

The length of the lifting span is 11 metres (36 ft) and a 9-metre (30 ft) navigation channel is provided.

== Bibliography ==
- Eickelmann, Christine; David Small (2004). PERO: The Life of a Slave in Eighteenth-Century Bristol. Redcliffe Press Ltd. ISBN 1-904537-03-0.
