= James Webbe Tobin =

English abolitionist (1767–1814)

James Webbe Tobin (1767–1814) was an English abolitionist, the son of a plantation owner on Nevis. He was a political radical, and friend of leading literary men.

== Life ==
He was the eldest son of James Tobin of Bristol and his first wife Elizabeth Webbe; George Tobin and John Tobin were his brothers. His father was in business with John Pretor Pinney, from 1783.

Tobin was educated at King Edward VI School, Southampton and Wadham College, Oxford, where he matriculated in 1787, and graduated B.A. in 1792. From 1795, until his brother John's death in 1804, they lived together in London.

In the 1790s Tobin befriended Samuel Taylor Coleridge and William Wordsworth; Wordsworth knew, through Basil Montagu and Francis Wrangham, the sons of John Pretor Pinney, and may have met Tobin through Montagu, or the Pinneys. Tobin brought Tom Wedgewood to meet Coleridge and Wordsworth in September 1797; Wedgwood later became Coleridge's patron. In letters of 1798, Wordsworth announced to Tobin, then James Losh, his major poetic project under the working title The Recluse.

Tobin had a degenerative eye condition, and at this period he was only partially sighted, ruling out a career. During 1799 he took part in the nitrous oxide experiments of Humphry Davy. He was an observer when Davy experimented with other inhalations at the Pneumatic Institution.

From 1807 Tobin and his family were on Nevis. He took a leading part in the cruelty case brought in 1810 against the plantation owner Edward Huggins; Huggins had bought the Montravers estate on Nevis from the Pretor Pinney family in 1808. Huggins was acquitted; Tobin made his views known, writing in particular to Hugh Elliot, the Governor of the Leeward Islands, claiming that the jury was packed. The Christian Observer noted that Tobin's blindness meant he could not be challenged to a duel for his stand. James Stephen wrote that others who backed him did not escape feuds.

== Works ==
Tobin contributed to The Annual Anthology edited by Robert Southey, and edited its third volume (1802). In 1812 he wrote a Reply to the pamphlet A plain statement of the motives which gave rise to the public punishment of several negroes (1811), by Thomas John Cottle, son-in-law of Edward Huggins.

== Family ==
Tobin married Jane Mallet or Mullett (1784–1837) in 1807. She was the daughter of Thomas Mullett (1745–1814), a Bristol stationer connected by marriage to Caleb Evans, a Particular Baptist minister in Bristol. They had at least four children, including the eldest son John James, born 1808/9, the friend of Humphry Davy.

After her husband's death, Jane Tobin and her family returned to England.
