= Georgian House, Bristol =

18th-century townhouse in Bristol, England

The Georgian House Museum
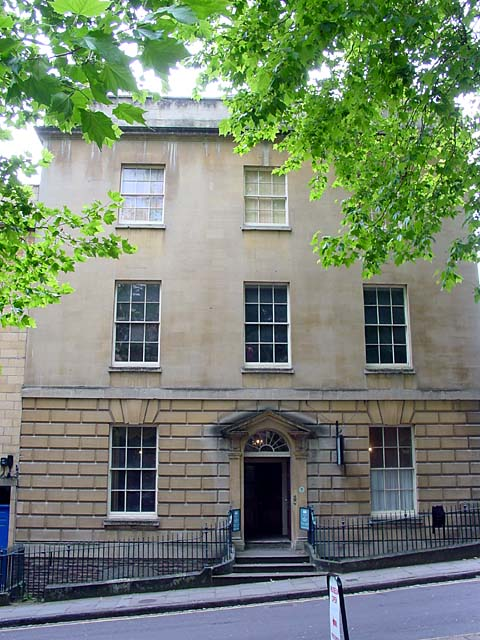
- The Georgian House Museum

- Location within Bristol

General information
- Location: 7 Great George Street, Bristol, England
- Coordinates: 51.45391°N 2.60337°W
- Year built: 1788–91
- Client: John Pinney

Design and construction
- Architect: William Paty

Website
- Official website

Listed Building – Grade II*
- Official name: The Georgian House, attached front area railings and rear garden walls
- Designated: 8 January 1959
- Reference no.: 1202244

The Georgian House is a historic house museum at 7 Great George Street in Bristol, England. It was built around 1790 for John Pinney, a wealthy sugar merchant and slave plantation owner, and is now furnished and displayed as a typical English town house of the Georgian period. The museum includes a drawing room, dining room, study, kitchen, laundry and housekeeper's room. There is also a small display on slavery and sugar plantations. The Georgian House has been run by Bristol City Council since it was presented to the city as a museum in 1937.

The museum is open from 1 April to 31 December on Saturdays, Sundays, Mondays and Tuesdays from 11am–4pm. It received 32,127 visitors in 2019.

== History ==
The Georgian House is a well-preserved example of a typical late 18th-century English town house, which has been designated by English Heritage as a Grade II* listed building. It was built around 1790 for John Pinney, a sugar merchant and slave plantation owner, and is believed to be the house where the poets William Wordsworth and Samuel Taylor Coleridge first met. It was also home to the freed slave Frances Coker who was a maid and Pinney's slave, Pero, after whom Pero's Bridge at Bristol Harbour is named.

It contains some of the original furniture and fittings, such as the bureau-bookcase in the study and a rare cold water plunge bath, and has been used as a location for the BBC television series A Respectable Trade, which was adapted from the novel by Philippa Gregory, about the slave trade.

== Areas of the house ==
- The Dining Room
- Pinney's Study
- The Drawing Room
- Library and a Ladies' Withdrawing Room
- The Bedroom
- A hidden staircase
- A small lift (dumb waiter)
- The Housekeeper's Room
- The cold water plunge pool

== Film and media ==
On 5 July 2010, Amanda Vickery filmed scenes for her series At home with the Georgians at the Georgian House.

The 1970s children's drama series The Georgian House was set here. The interior of the house was recreated in studio.

== See also ==
- Blaise Castle House Museum
- Bristol Archives
- Bristol Museum & Art Gallery
- Bristol slave trade
- Grade II* listed buildings in Bristol
- Kings Weston House
- The Red Lodge Museum
