= Bristol West India Association =

The Bristol West India Association was a group initially set up in 1782 in a meeting at Bristol's Bush Tavern and publicly established in April 1789 to lobby against the abolition of slavery in the United Kingdom. Its first general meeting was held at Merchants' Hall. One of its founders, James Tobin, was active in both the Bristol and London branches of the West India Committee. Thomas Daniel, another founding member, joined at the age of 20, and remained a member for life, holding the offices of Treasurer, Secretary and Chairman.

In its wake, other local and regional branches of the West India Association were set up; for example the Liverpool West Indian Association was founded in 1799 and the Glasgow West India Association was established in 1807. Once emancipation was perceived as inevitable, the Bristol West India Association campaigned on behalf of its members for compensation for their loss of profits when the Slavery Abolition Act 1833 became law.

== See also ==
- Slave Compensation Act 1837
