= John Pinney =

British sugar merchant (1740–1818)

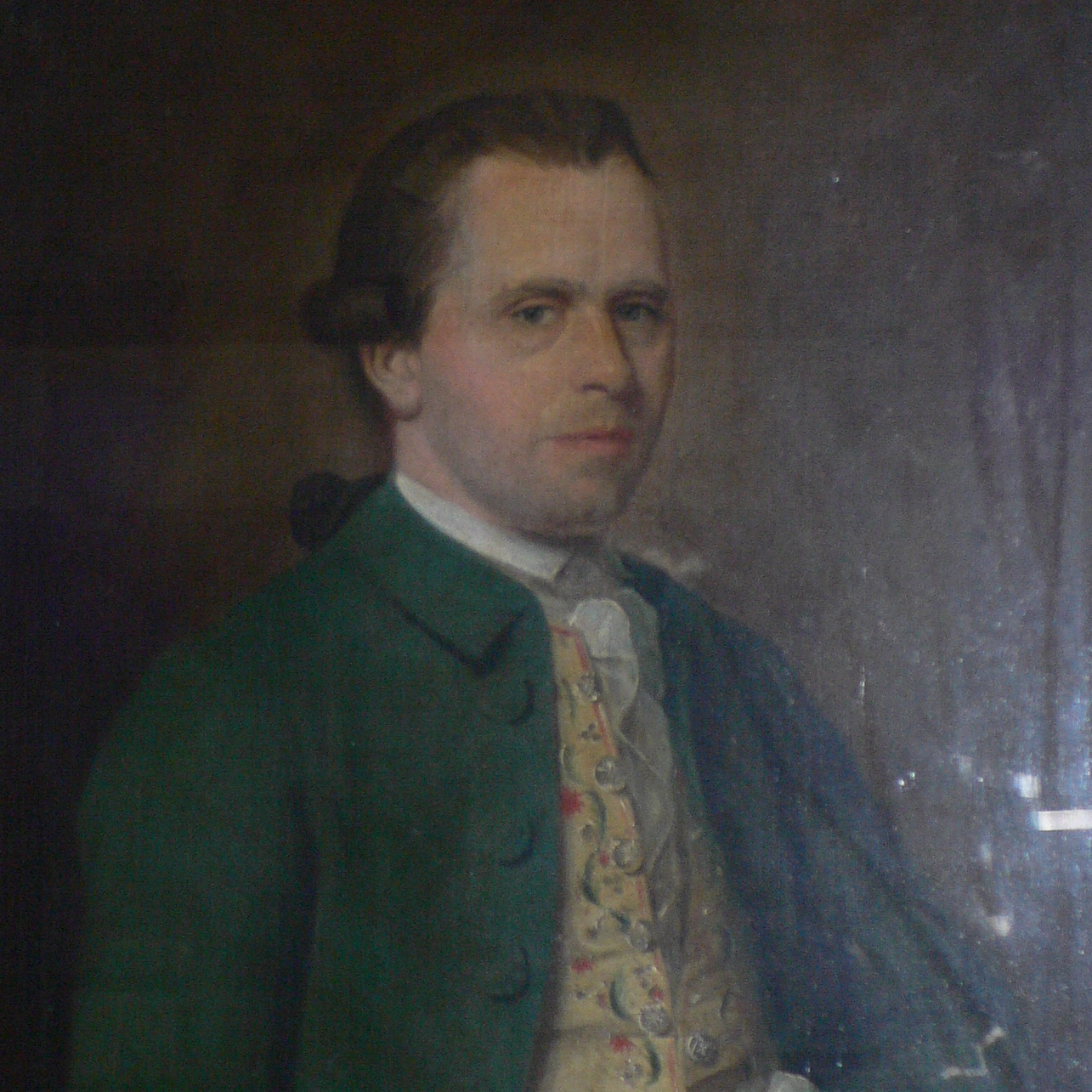
- Born: John Pretor; 1740; Chard, Somerset
- Died: 23 January 1818 (aged 77–78); Bristol
- Relatives: John Frederick Pinney

John Pretor Pinney (1740 – 23 January 1818) was a plantation and slave owner on the island of Nevis in the West Indies and was a sugar merchant in Bristol. He made his fortune from England’s demand for sugar. His Bristol residence is now the city's Georgian House Museum.

== Early life ==
Born John Pretor in Chard, Somerset in 1740, his parents were Michael Pretor (d.1744) and Alicia Clarke (d.1759). His mother had a distant cousin, John Frederick Pinney, who had no children, so in 1762 at the age of 22 John Pretor was the key beneficiary of John Frederick’s will, inheriting land in Dorset and several plantations worked by enslaved people on Nevis. His inheritance was on the condition that he took the surname Pinney, which he did. John Pretor Pinney left England for Nevis in 1764 where he remained until 1783. The plantations which he inherited had been built up by his great-great-uncle, Azariah Pinney (1661–1720) and his family. Azariah Pinney had been granted a pardon by James II for his part in the Monmouth Rebellion on the condition that he spent 10 years in the West Indies; he arrived in Nevis in 1682. However, by the time John Pretor Pinney inherited the estates, they were run down and in debt.

== Nevis plantation ==
Over 20 years John Pretor Pinney built up both the size and number of the estates he either owned outright or as a mortgagee, as well as increasing the number of enslaved people he owned. Soon after his arrival on Nevis, between January 1765 and July 1768 John Pretor Pinney bought over sixty Africans. After his first purchase he wrote:

Since my arrival I’ve purchased nine negroe slaves at St Kitts and can assure you I was shock’d at the first appearance of human flesh exposed to sale. But surely God ordain’d ‘em for ye use & benefit of us: otherwise his Divine Will would have been made manifest by some particular sign or token.

Later, he owned between 170 and 210 people on his 394 acre plantation 'Mountravers', producing sugar and rum to be shipped to Bristol and London. In 1772 Pinney married a white Creole, Jane Weekes, with whom he had seven children. When Pinney left Nevis to return to England with his family in 1783 he was worth about £70,000 (the equivalent of £11.4 million as of 2024, based on the percentage increase in the Retail Price Index from 1783 to 2024).

== Return to England ==
On his return he settled in Bristol where he began a business partnership as a sugar merchant with James Tobin, the pro-slave trade campaigner. They owned ships trading between the West Indies and England, loaned money to plantation owners on which they charged interest (from which he made most of his wealth), and took over plantations and slaves from those who could not pay their debts. During his time back in England Pinney increased his wealth 5 times from that which he brought back from Nevis. When he died in 1818 his fortune was worth about £340,000 (the equivalent of about £24.5 million as of 2019, based on the percentage increase in the Retail Price Index from 1818 to 2019). Pinney brought two people with him to Bristol from Nevis: Frances (Fanny) Coker, his wife’s freed 'mulatto' servant, and Pinney’s manservant Pero Jones (1753–1798) who was never freed. Pero's Bridge in Bristol is named after him. Unusually, Pinney was not a member of the Society of Merchant Venturers, but was a member of the West India Association in Bristol which in the late 1780s lobbied to defend the slave trade. His son Charles Pinney took over much of his father’s business, although John Pretor Pinney's main estate of Mountravers had been sold in 1808. When the Slavery Abolition Act 1833 abolished slavery throughout most of the British Empire, Charles and his other son, John Frederick, received £23,210 in compensation from the British government for 1220 enslaved people.

== Death and legacy ==
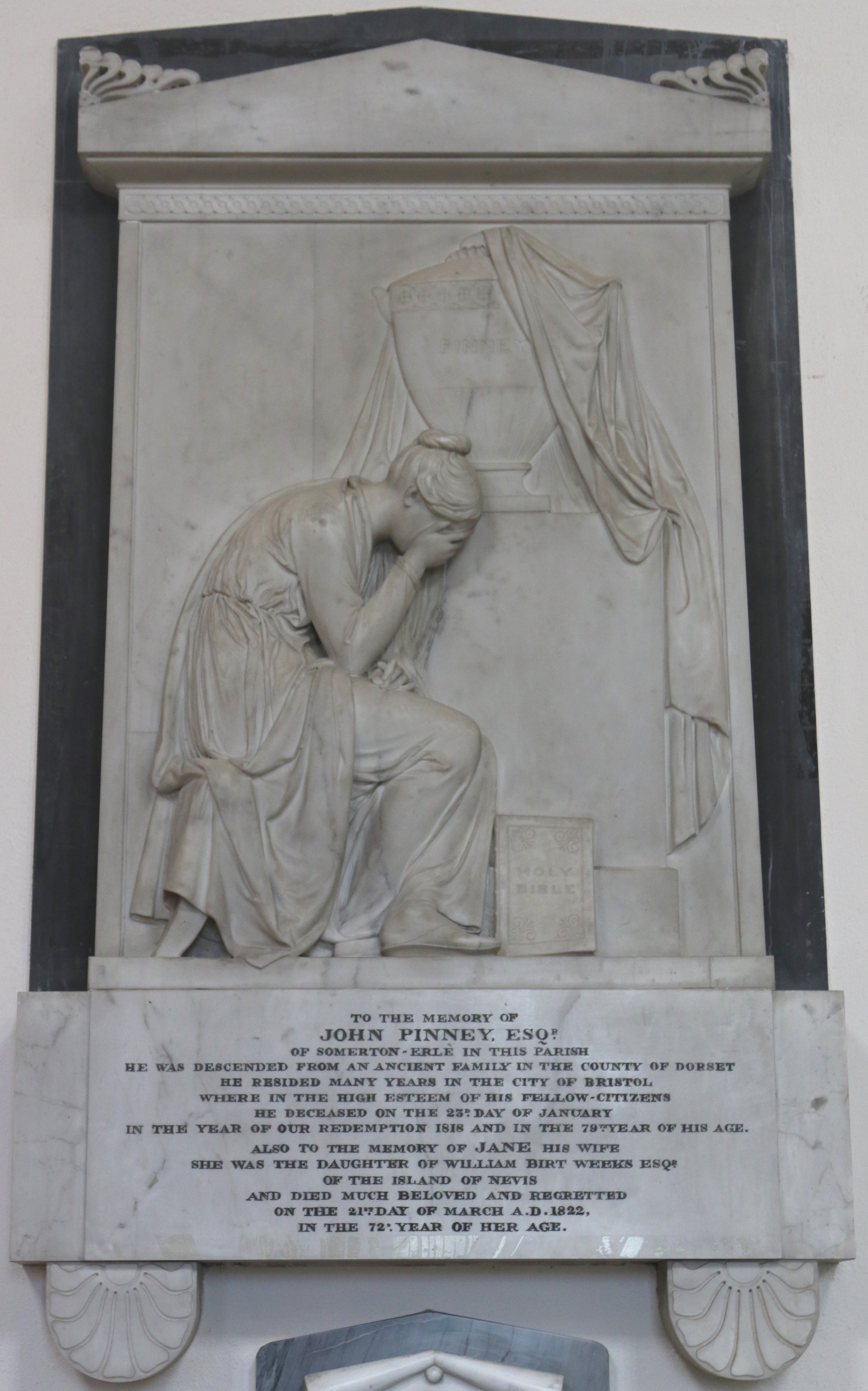
Memorial in St Michael and All Angels' Church, Somerton

Pinney died in Bristol on 23 January 1818, and was buried in the family vault in the parish church at Somerton in Somerset.

His house at 7 Great George Street is now a museum owned and run by Bristol City Council. In the Georgian House Museum is a list of the names of over 900 enslaved people owned by the Pinney family, many of whose biographies have been researched by Christine Eickelmann.
