= Black Castle, Bristol =

Grade I listed pub in Bristol, England

Coordinates: 51°26′36″N 2°33′39″W

Black Castle Public House
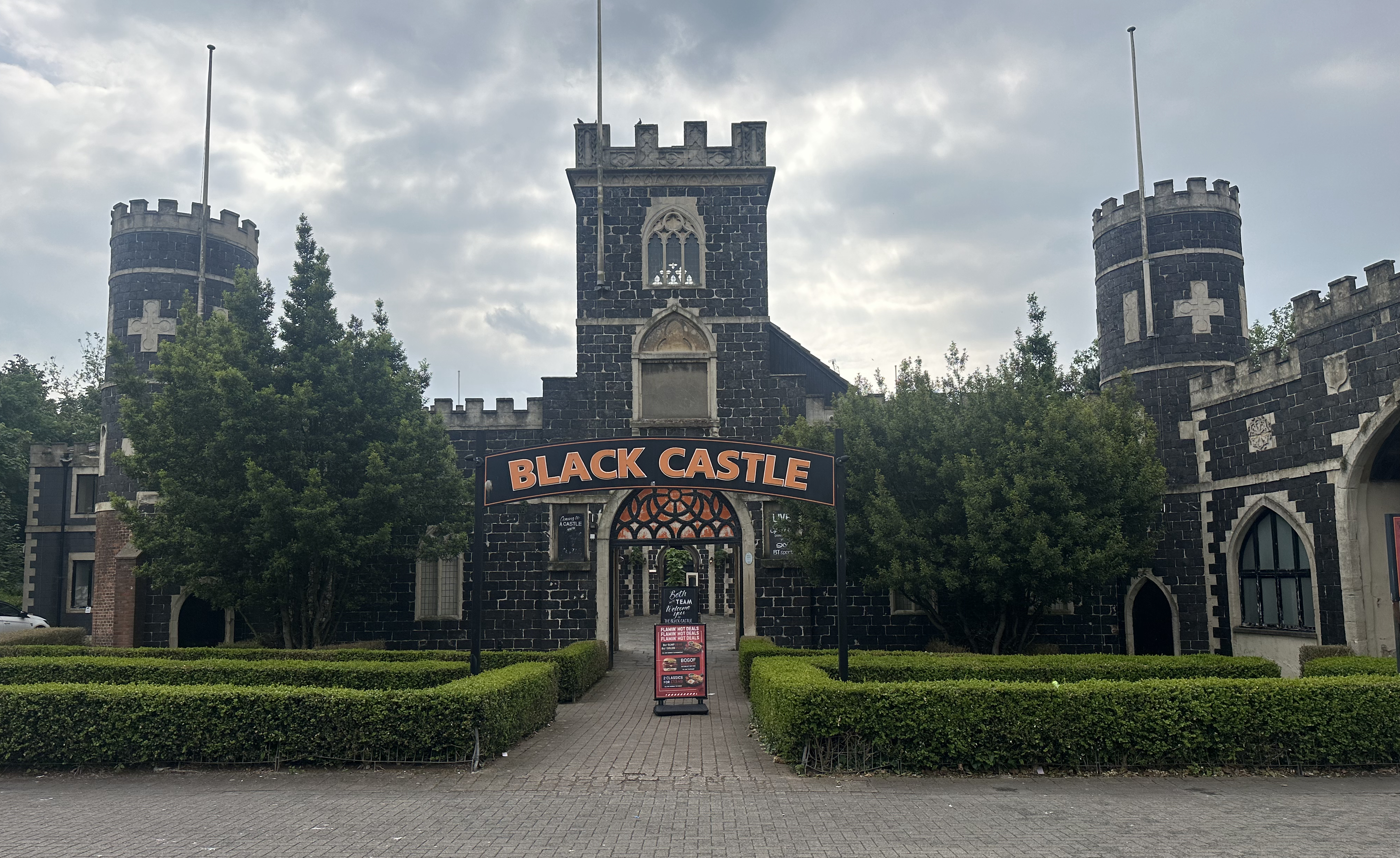
- Interactive map of the Black Castle Public House area

General information
- Location: Bristol, England
- Completed: 1745–1755
- Client: William Reeve

Design and construction
- Architect: William Halfpenny or James Bridges

Black Castle Public House is a Grade I-listed building and public house on Junction Road in the Brislington suburb of the English city of Bristol. It is also known as Arno's Castle.

== History ==
It was built in 1745–55 as a folly in the form of a castle which incorporated office spaces and recreation rooms, but may have originally been a stable block and laundry for the lord of the manor. The building was probably designed by either William Halfpenny or James Bridges, for the prominent local factory owner William Reeve of Mount Pleasant, now the Arnos Manor Hotel, from which it is separated by a major road junction. Reeve smelted brass and copper, and the Black Castle was built from blocks created from the waste slag.

In a letter written during a visit to Bristol in 1766, Horace Walpole said he was "struck with a large Gothic building, coal black, and striped with white", and that he initially took it for "the devil's cathedral", before learning it served as stables and offices for the adjacent Arnos Court estate.

== Description ==
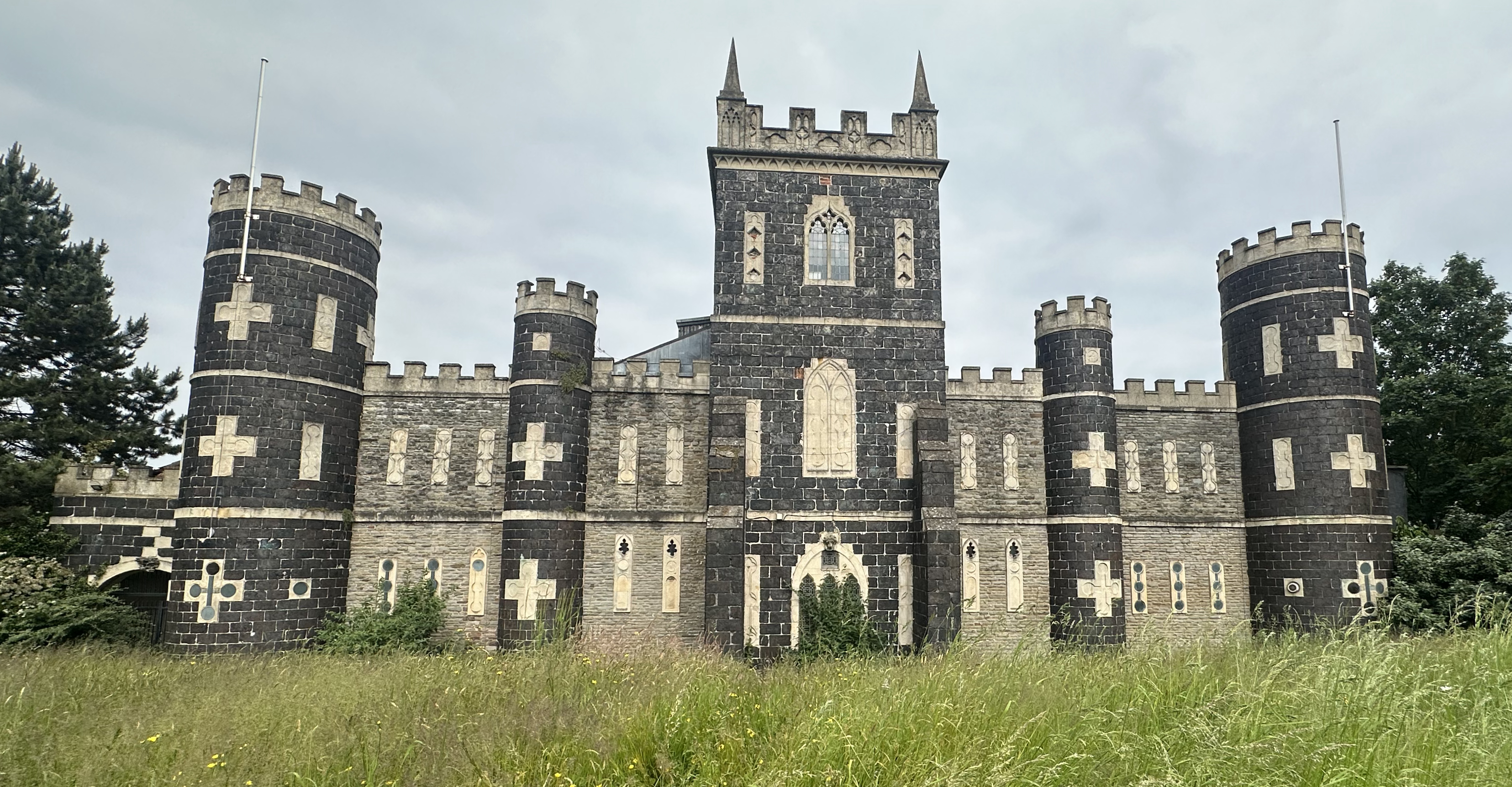
Black Castle Bristol rear

Designed in Gothic Revival style, the building is symmetrical in plan with crenellated circular towers at each corner that link two-storey blocks to form a square courtyard. The front and back blocks have larger crenellated entrance towers with moulded archways through. Above the front arch is a blank panel with ogee head and a two-centre arch on the second storey with perpendicular tracery. The ranges to each side of the entrance have two windows with Y-tracery below a white string course and white carved inset panels. At the top of the ranges are light-coloured battlements with sunken panels.

The front corner towers have external entrances with two-centred archways and above them are prominent white flushwork panels, some of which are in the shape of crosses while others mimic arrow slits. A coach house extends from the right-hand corner tower at right angles to the main structure. It has a central two-centre archway front and back with similar small windows on both sides. Above the string course are round flushwork panels and the crenellated parapet is raised above the entrance.

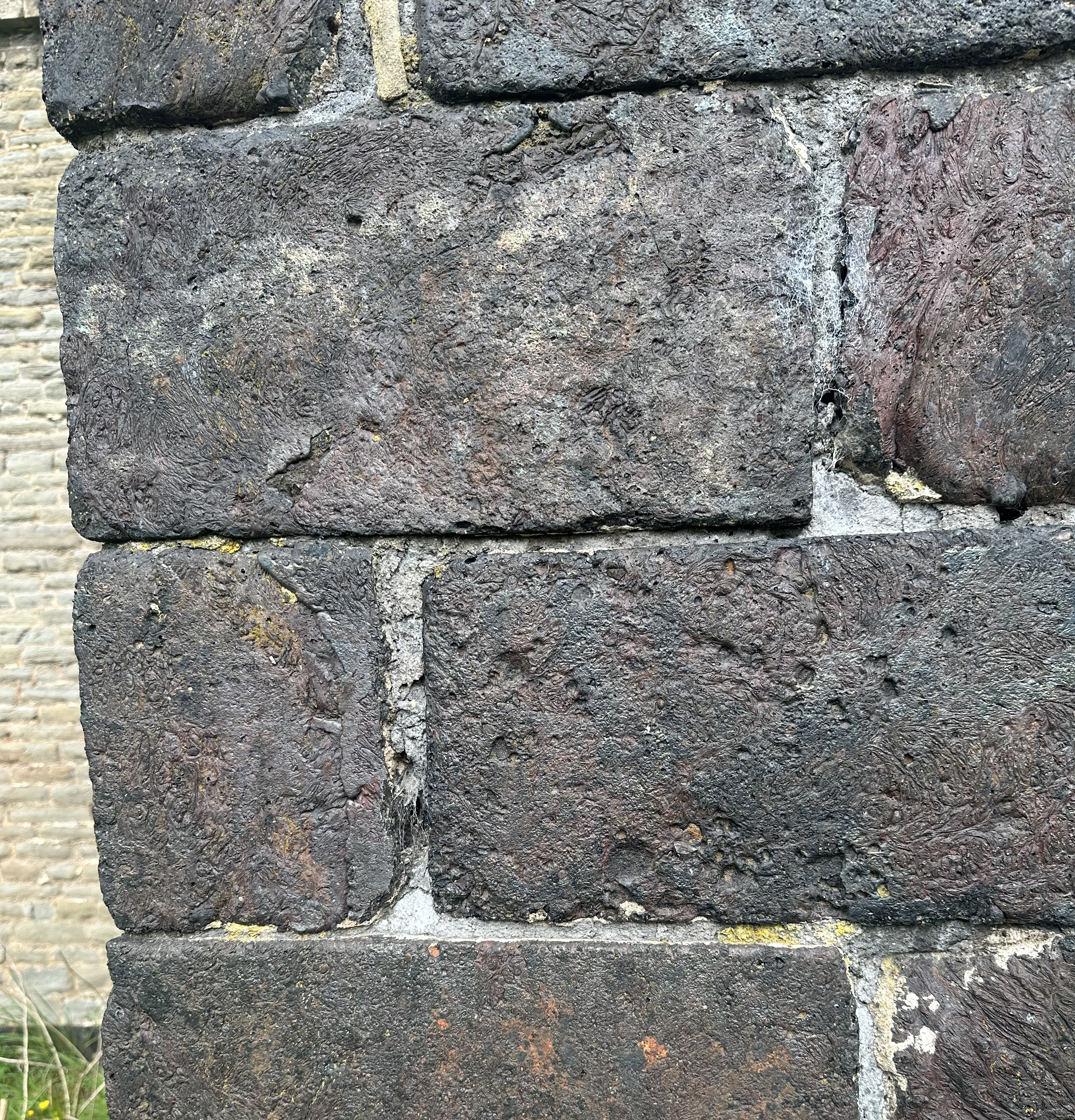
Black Castle fabric

The Castle is built from pre-cast black copper-slag blocks from William Reeve's 'Bristol Brass Company' foundry at Crew's Hole. Turning such slag into a building material became quite common in Bristol during the second half of the 18th century. It was a way of disposing of waste 'cinders' that had previously been dumped on the banks of the River Avon, to the annoyance of Bristol's City Council, who noted in 1749 that this was ‘a very great nuisance and likely to choak up the said river if not removed’.

Much of the freestone carving and dressings on the building supposedly came from the city's demolished medieval gateways and St Werburgh's Church, rebuilt by James Bridges in 1758–61. The Black Castle has been designated by Historic England as a Grade I listed building. Arno's Court Triumphal Arch used to stand in front of the building, but was moved in 1912 to approximately 100 metres away.

== See also ==
- Grade I listed buildings in Bristol
