= James Bridges (architect) =

British architect (c.1725–1763)

- Born: c.1725
- Died: 1763
- Occupation: Architect

James Bridges (born c. 1725) was an English architect and civil engineer working in Bristol between 1757 and 1763. He designed Royal Fort House (1760), rebuilt St Werburgh's Church (1758–61) and began the rebuilding of both Bristol Bridge and St Nicholas' Church.

== Life ==
He was the son of Henry Bridges, an Essex carpenter and clockmaker, famous for his Microcosm. He claimed he was taught all he knew by his father, but also that he had viewed the works of the ancients, suggesting he may have done the Grand Tour.

Bridges was a talented, personable and highly literate man, but when he arrived in Bristol in the mid-1750s he never claimed any previous work. He made several trips to London at his own expense to consult Robert Mylne and Sir Isaac Ware on his plans. Like his father, he seems to have been comfortably off. He or his friends and family must have put up bonds for his work: his successor on Bristol Bridge had to pay £10,000.

== Houses ==
In Bristol he built The Royal Fort, a mansion for a merchant banker overlooking the city. Often attributed to three architects, it has his characteristic eye for detail and comfort. His model of it survives. It is now part of Bristol University. Similar detail is seen in Arnos Manor Hotel, now a hotel, at Brislington on the outskirts of the city, . It included a famous pleasure garden, incorporating remnants of St Werburgh's church in the centre of the city, which he was rebuilding at the same time. After the Second World War the estate fell into neglect and the bath house was rescued and relocated to Portmeirion in Wales.

For the coronation of King George III he produced a spectacular illumination with fireworks in Queen Square. He also did magic tricks, and seems to have got on well with people; the local newspaper Felix Farley's Journal was a great supporter of him.

== Bristol Bridge ==
His main claim to fame was being given the job of surveyor to rebuild Bristol Bridge. The bridge had become dangerous due to the increase in traffic and encroachments narrowing the roadway. Bridges was given the job of rebuilding the four-arched medieval bridge as a classical three arch bridge on the original foundations. The entrance to the bridge was also dangerous, so he was also given the job of rebuilding nearby St Nicholas' church. A number of locals waged a war against him, mocking his lack of classical education and claiming he was a carpenter and joiner, but his assessment of St Nicholas' wooden tower as sound makes it clear he knew little of wood. It proved too much for him so in 1763 he left, the church and bridge unfinished. His work was finished by Thomas Paty whose family became the main builders in Georgian Bristol.

== List of works ==
- Arnos Manor Hotel (from 1740s)
- Arno's Court Triumphal Arch (1760)
- Black Castle Public House (1745–55)
- Royal Fort House (1760) for Thomas Tyndall
- Bristol Bridge (1763–69), with Thomas Paty
- St Werburgh's Church (1758–61)
- St Nicholas Church, St Nicholas Street (1762–69), with Thomas Paty
- Castle Ward, Strangford, County Down, Northern Ireland (1760s) – attribution uncertain
