= St Nicholas Church, Bristol =

St Nicholas, Bristol
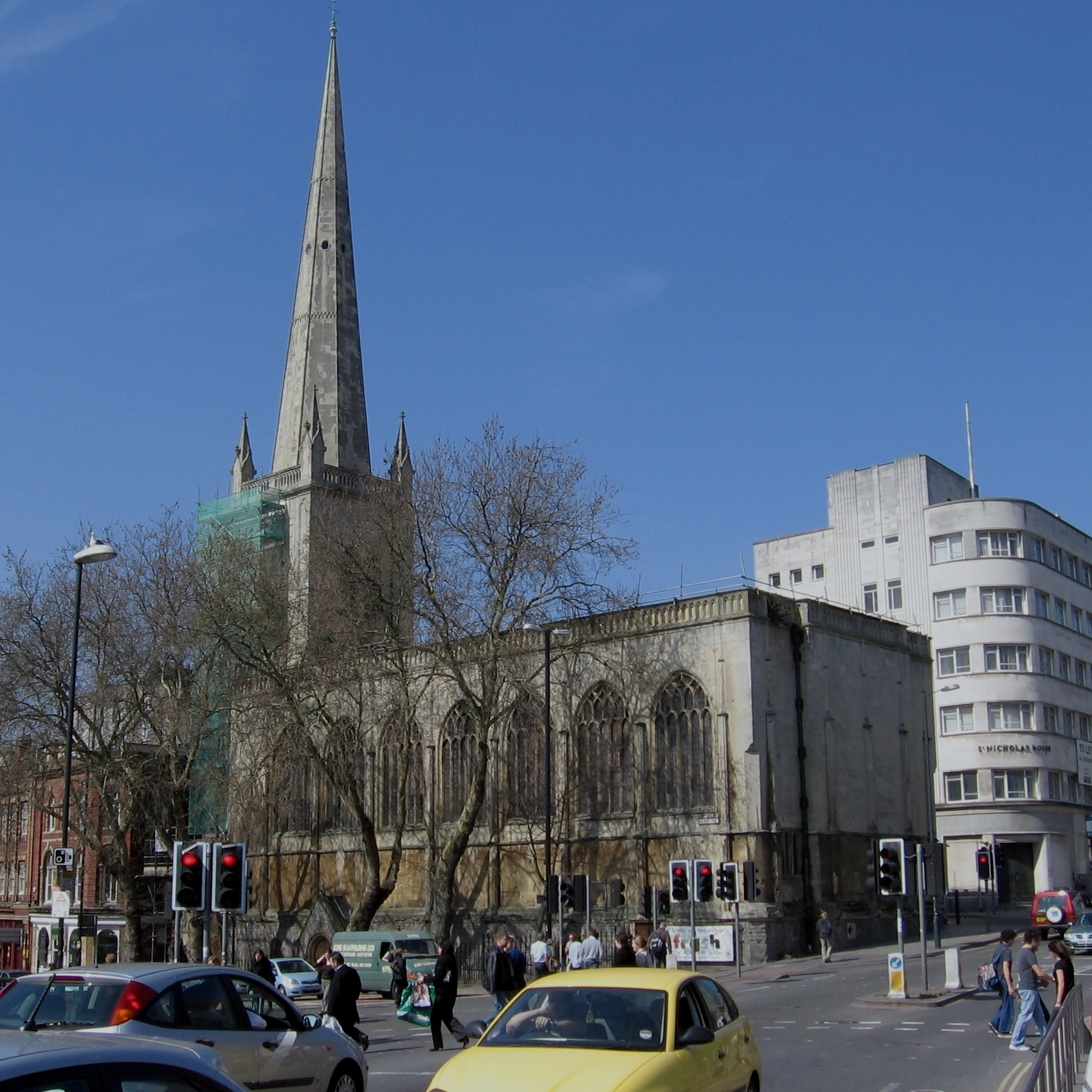
- St Nicholas, Bristol
- 51.4536°N 2.5929°W
- Location: Bristol
- Country: England
- Denomination: Church of England
- Website: https://stnicholasbristol.org

Architecture
- Functional status: Active (Part of the HTB network)
- Architect(s): James Bridges and Thomas Paty
- Architectural type: Gothic Revival
- Completed: 1769

Administration
- Diocese: Diocese of Bristol
- Archdeaconry: Archdeaconry of Bristol
- Parish: St Nicholas

Clergy
- Priest: Toby Flint

St Nicholas is a church in St Nicholas Street, Bristol, England. The church was bombed in the Second World War and rebuilt in 1974–1975 as a church museum. This museum closed in 2007 and the building was used by the city council as offices; in 2018 the church came back into use as an Anglican place of worship in the Diocese of Bristol.

== History ==
The first church was founded before 1154, with a chancel extending over the south gate of the city. The gate and old church were demolished to make way for the rebuilding of Bristol Bridge, and the church was rebuilt in 1762–1769 by James Bridges and Thomas Paty, who rebuilt the spire. Part of the old church and town wall survives in the 14th-century crypt.

The interior was destroyed by bombing in the Bristol Blitz of 1940 and rebuilt in 1974–1975 as a church museum. This closed in 2007 and the building was used by the city council as offices. The building once held statues of King Edward I and King Edward III which were removed from Arno's Court Triumphal Arch. The original statues were taken from Bristol's Lawfords' Gate that was demolished around 1760. Other statues are 13th-century figures from Bristol's Newgate representing Robert, the builder of Bristol Castle, and Geoffrey de Montbray, bishop of Coutances, builder of the fortified walls of Bristol. They were moved to the church, due to their deteriorating condition, in 1898.

It currently holds one of only two public commissions by William Hogarth, the tripartite altarpiece (Bristol Museum ref K2429-K2431), Sealing the Tomb which was originally painted for St Mary Redcliffe Church in 1755. The painting remained at St Mary Redcliffe until 1858, when the Victorian community mounted a campaign to remove those furnishings which were not in keeping with the church's original Gothic character. The three paintings were sold for £20 to the Bristol Academy for the Promotion of the Fine Arts (later to become the Royal West of England Academy). In 1910 their sale was again proposed, prompting the Bristol Times and Mirror to comment "Bristol will be looked upon as one of those places which prefer hard cash to art treasures" (Bristol Times and Mirror, 22 February 1910). In 1955 the paintings were passed over to Bristol Museum and Art Gallery and restored whilst residing in St Nicholas' church.

The building has been designated as a grade II* listed building.

== Clock ==
The clock on the church is unusual as it is the only church clock in Britain that indicates seconds. The original clock was installed in the early 19th Century with the seconds hand added during renovation in the 1870s. The mechanism was destroyed in the Second World War, it was later repaired and converted to electrical power.

== Present day ==
In January 2018, it was announced that St Nicholas' church would be re-opened by the Church of England and used for worship once more. It will be part of the HTB network, having been planted by Holy Trinity Brompton. The church was re-opened on 30 September 2018. The first service for 60 years was on Sunday 9 December 2018.

== Gallery ==
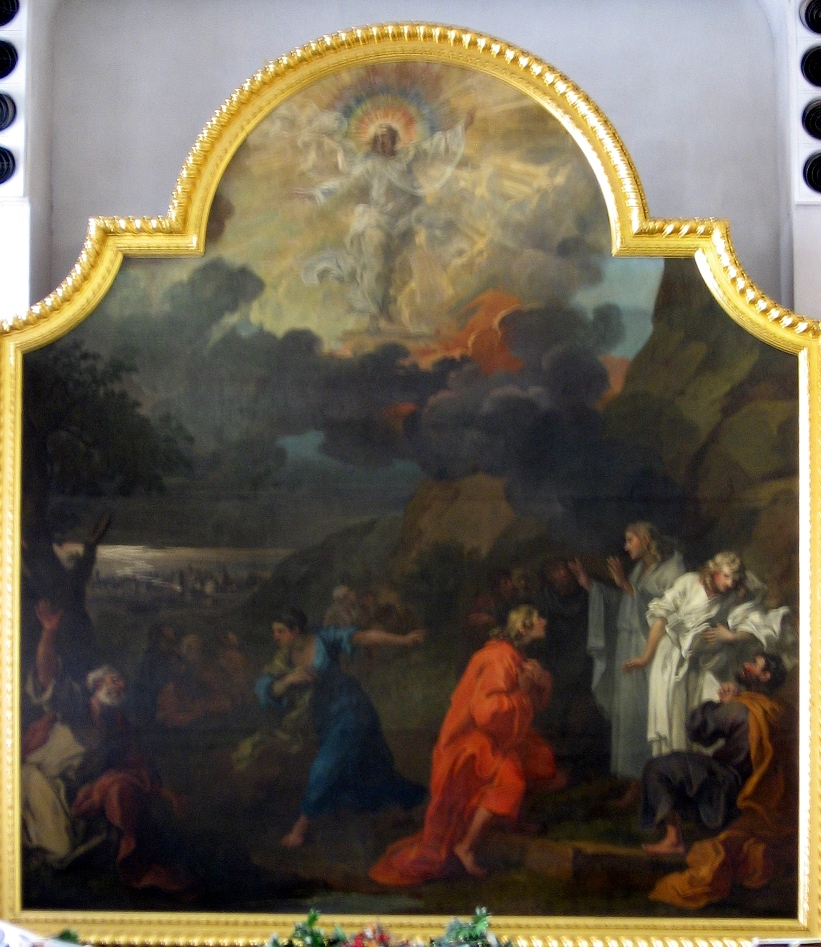
Central panel of the Hogarth triptych

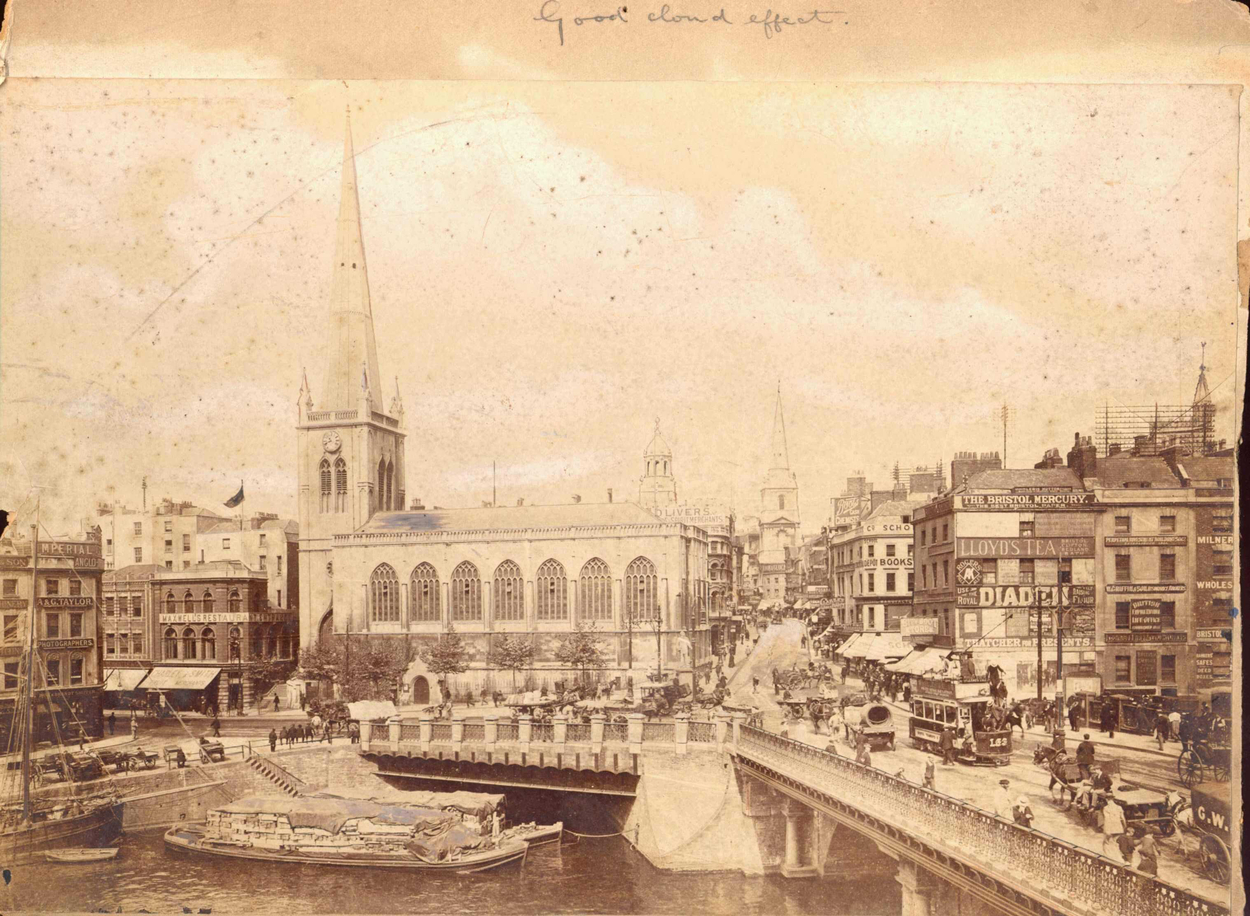
Photograph from c.1900 showing the south view of St Nicholas Church

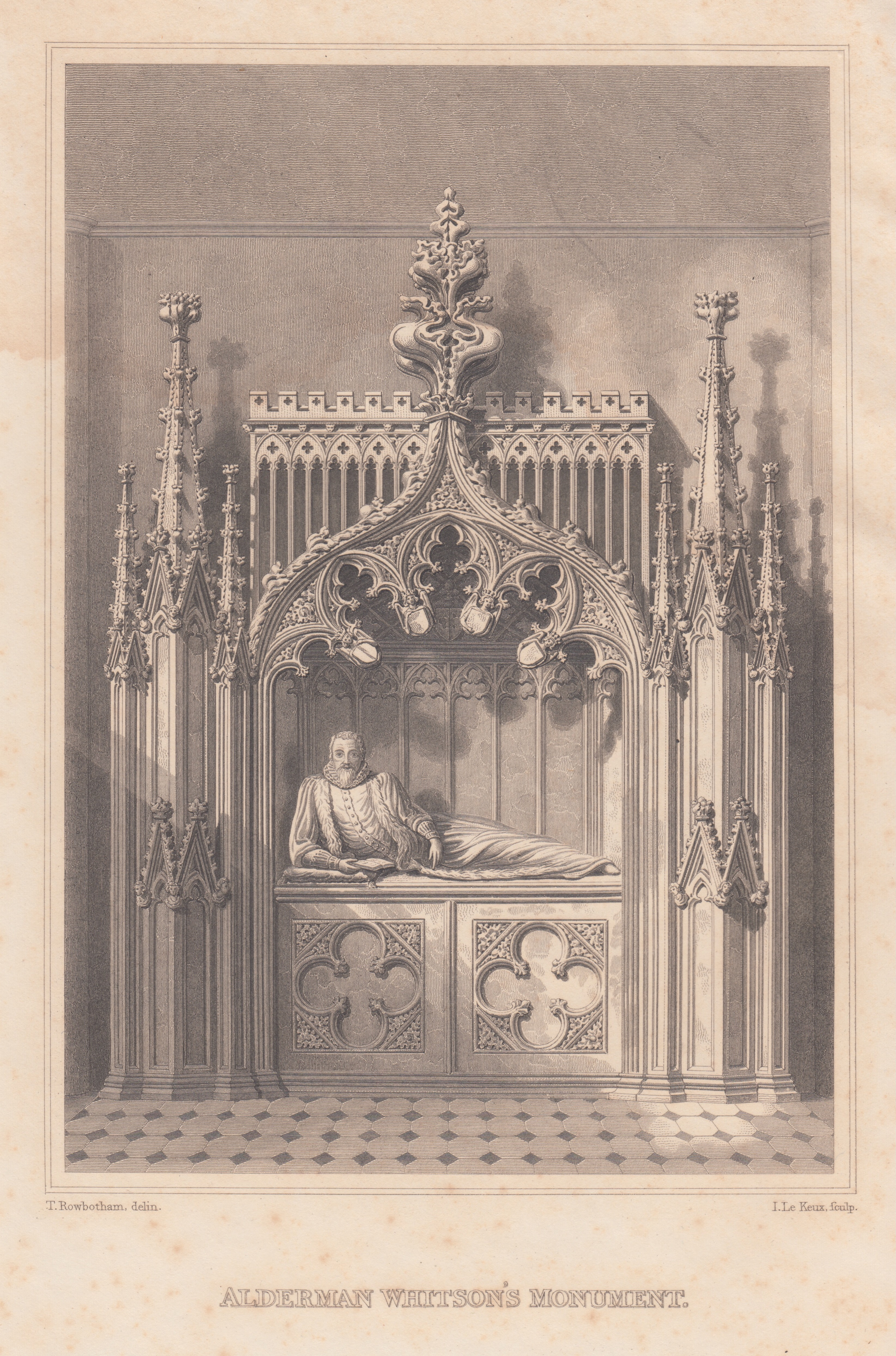
Alderman Whitson's Monument (c.1820) in the church

== See also ==
- St Nicholas, Bristol: church website
- Churches in Bristol
- Grade II* listed buildings in Bristol
- List of tallest buildings and structures in Bristol
