= Sealing the Tomb =

Triptych painting by William Hogarth (1755)

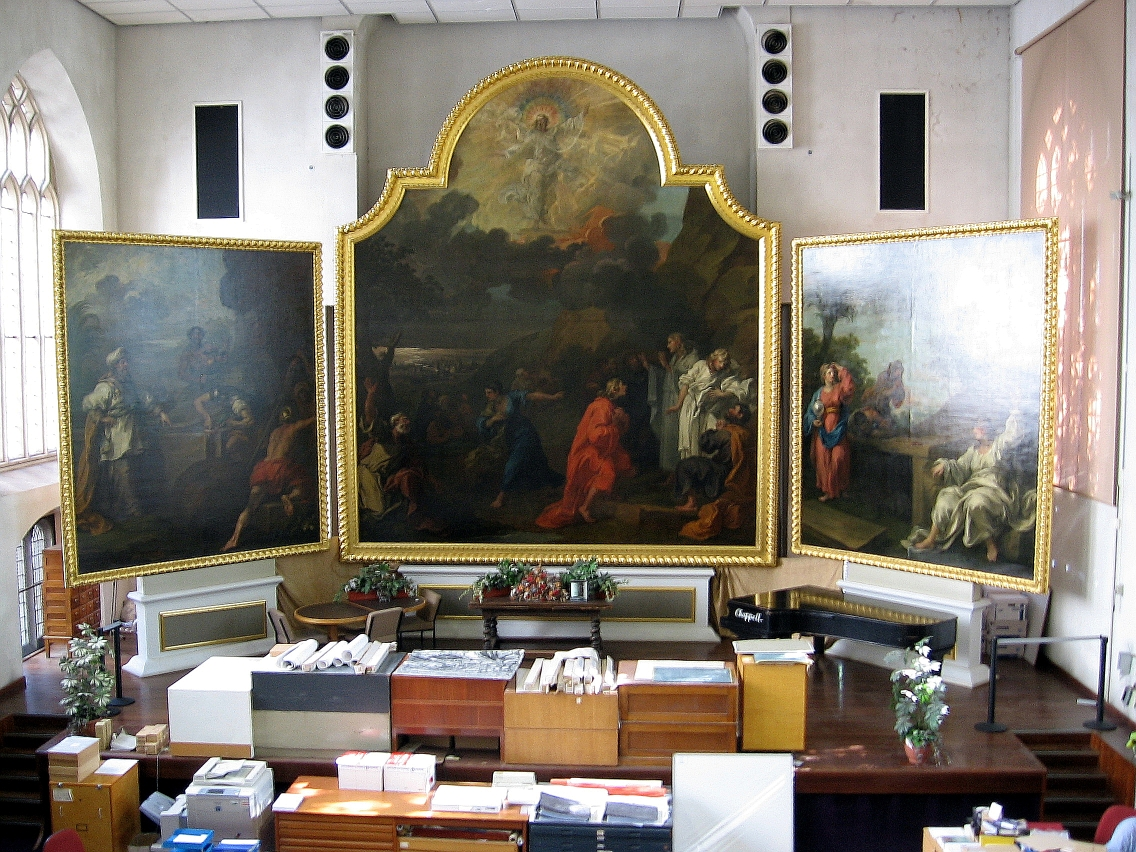
- Artist: William Hogarth
- Year: 1755
- Completion date: 1756
- Type: triptych
- Medium: Oil on canvas
- Subject: Sealing the Tomb
- Dimensions: 22 feet (6.7 m) by 19 feet (5.8 m) (centre); 13 feet 10 inches (4.22 m) by 12 feet (3.7 m) (sides)
- Location: St Nicholas, Bristol

Sealing the Tomb is a great altarpiece triptych by William Hogarth in the English city of Bristol. It was commissioned for St Mary Redcliffe in 1755. In the 19th century attempts were made to sell it, but it was given to the Bristol Fine Art Academy, which became the Royal West of England Academy. Its size made it difficult to display and it was rolled up and stored in the basement. In 1973 it was displayed in the ecclesiastical museum created in the war-damaged Church of St Nicholas. When the museum closed it was converted to offices; however the triptych remains in the building. It is on display to the public again after the church was re-consecrated in 2018.

== Description ==
The three scenes depicted are the Ascension featuring Mary Magdalene, on a central canvas which is 22 feet (6.7 m) by 19 feet (5.8 m). It is flanked by The Sealing of the Sepulchre and the Three Marys at the Tomb each of which is 13 feet 10 inches (4.22 m) by 12 feet (3.7 m). They are mounted in gilded frames.

== History ==
The painting was commissioned from William Hogarth in 1755 to fill the east end of the chancel of St Mary Redcliffe. It was Hogarth's only commission from the Church of England; he did not follow any faith. The churchwardens paid him £525 for his painting. Thomas Paty made the frames. The total cost was £7671 6s 4d.

The three paintings were too wide for the church and the side panels were placed at an angle to the central one. During the Victorian era Hogarth's work was no longer thought to be suitable for the church and attempts were made to sell it to the National Gallery or via Christie's and an advertisement was placed in The Times; however no potential purchasers could be found. It was given to the Bristol Fine Art Academy, which became the Royal West of England Academy, in 1859. In 1910 another attempt was made to sell it, again without success. The work took up a great deal of display space and presented challenges for public display. It was eventually rolled up and stored in the basement. The museum officially acquired the paintings in 1955 with £500 from the Art Collections Fund.

The painting is now displayed in St Nicholas, Bristol. The church was damaged by incendiary bombs during World War II and was considered for demolition in the 1950s. The building was partially restored and the roof replaced by 1964 when it was leased to The Corporation of Bristol as a museum of church artefacts and local history. It opened in 1973 and Hogarth's triptych was installed at the eastern end. The museum closed in 1991; however the painting remained within the offices of the Bristol & Region Archaeological Services. When the church was re-consecrated in 2018, the three paintings were put on display to the public again.

== See also ==
- List of works by William Hogarth
