= St Werburgh's Church, Bristol =

Former church, now climbing centre, in Bristol, England

St Werburgh's Church
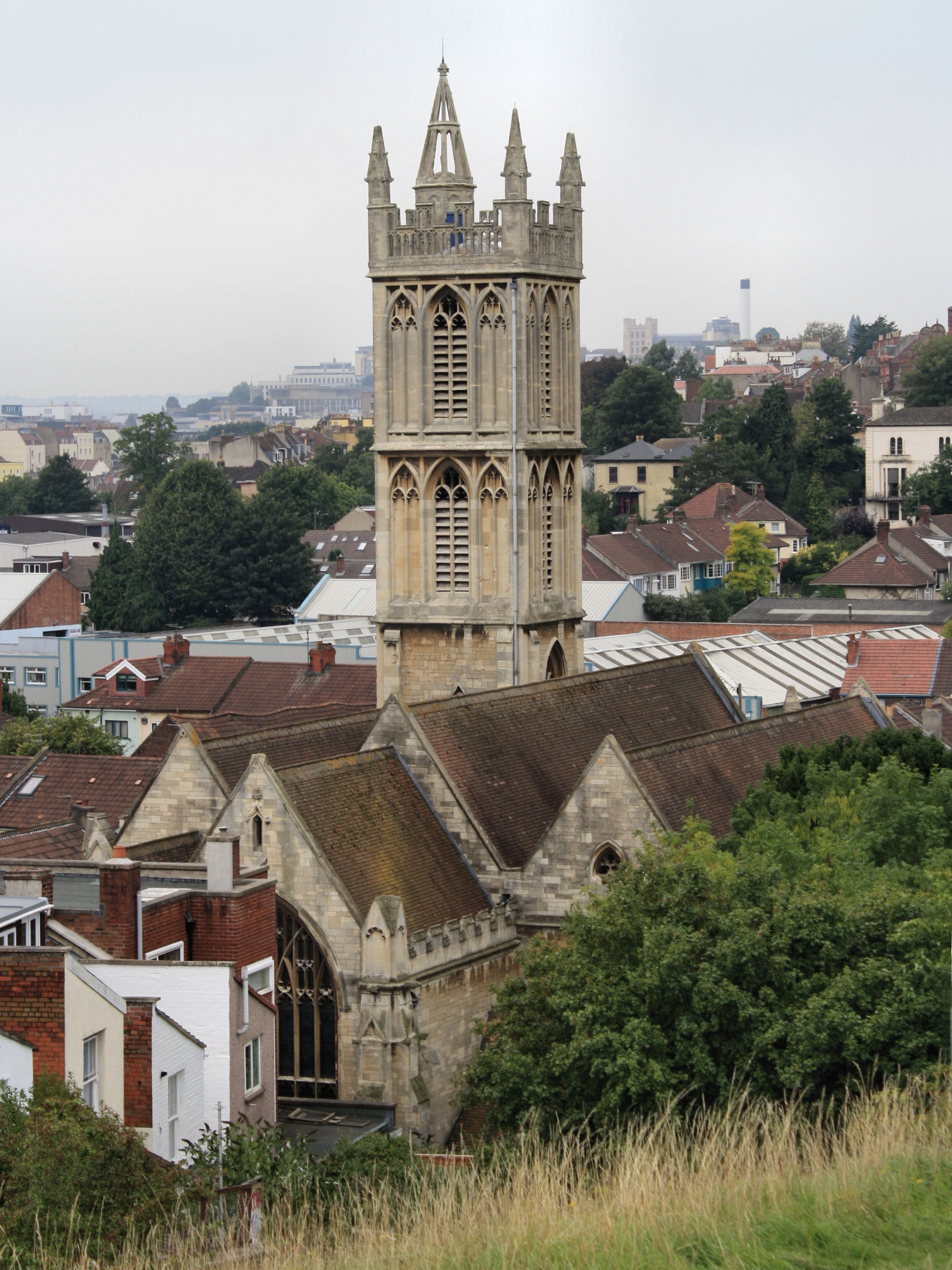
- St Werburgh's Church as seen from the northeast at Narroways Hill in Bristol

General information
- Architectural style: Gothic Revival
- Location: Bristol, England
- Coordinates: 51.4717°N 2.5764°W
- Current tenants: The Climbing Academy
- Construction started: 1759 (Corn Street rebuild); 1878 (Relocation)
- Completed: 1879

Height
- Height: 27 m (89 ft)

Design and construction
- Architects: James Bridges (1760); John Bevan (1879)
- Main contractor: Messrs. Wilkins and Sons (1879)

Listed Building – Grade II*
- Official name: Church of St Werburgh
- Designated: 4 March 1977
- Reference no.: 1025007

St Werburgh's Church is a former Church of England parish church, now an indoor climbing centre, located in the St Werburgh's area of Bristol, England. Originally a medieval structure situated on the corner of Corn Street and Small Street in the old city, the building was dismantled and rebuilt at its current site in Mina Road in 1879 as part of a redevelopment project. It has been designated on the National Heritage List for England as a Grade II* listed building.

The church is includes a Perpendicular Gothic tower, which dates to the late 14th century and was carefully preserved and moved stone-by-stone during a 19th-century relocation. The surrounding area, previously known as Baptist Mills, adopted the name St Werburgh's following the church's consecration at the new site.

After declaring the church redundant, the Diocese of Bristol deconsecrated the building in 1988. In 1992, it was converted into one of the United Kingdom's first indoor climbing centres, originally known as Undercover Rock. The facility has since changed ownership, passing to The Climbing Academy (TCA) in 2016.

== History ==
=== Corn Street ===
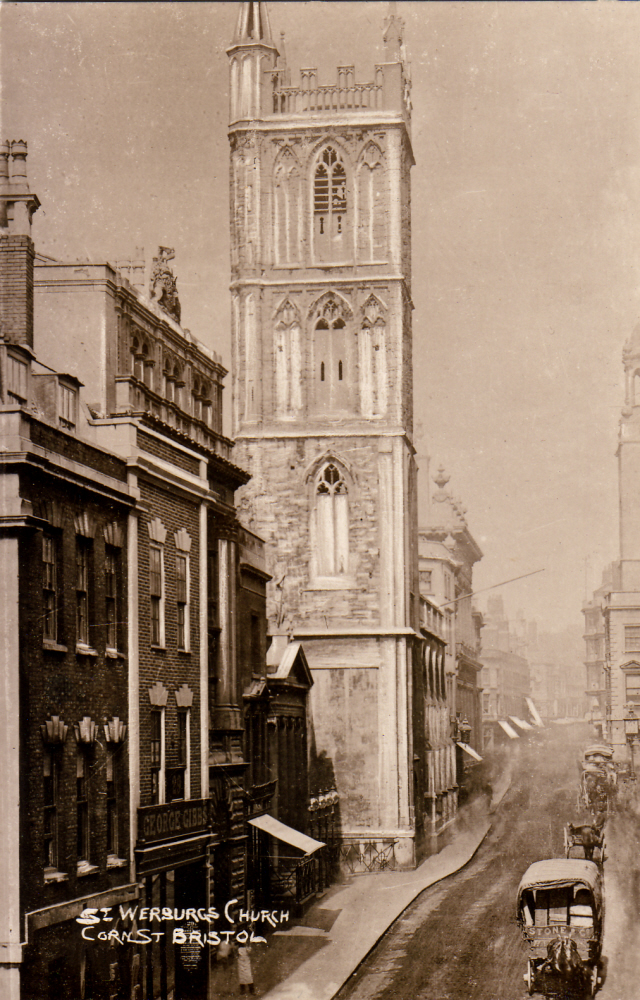
Postcard from c. 1860 of Corn Street, Bristol, showing the original position of St Werburgh's church on the north side of the road.

The original church of St Werburgh, of medieval origin, stood on the corner of Corn Street and Small Street in the old city. It has been suggested that the dedication to the Anglo-Saxon princess Werburgh, a daughter of Wulfhere, the Christian King of Mercia, implies a pre-Conquest foundation.

The church served as the burial place for several notable figures in Bristol's history, including John Foster, the founder of the Foster's Almshouses on Christmas Steps. Also buried there were members of the Creswick family, including Francis Creswick and his son, Sir Henry Creswick, who served as sheriff in 1643 and mayor in 1660. The building was rebuilt by James Bridges in 1758. It has been argued that Bridges likely only demolished the east end of the chancel for road widening and repaired the rest, meaning the main body of the church demolished in 1877 was substantially medieval rather than Georgian.

In the 19th century, the interior of the Corn Street church was noted for its high-backed pews, oak paneling, and an altarpiece of dark, gilt wood. An organ built by a Mr. Smith of Bristol was installed in 1842.

During the demolition in 1877, excavations revealed encaustic tiles and gilded freestone capitals six feet beneath the pavement, which were identified as remnants of the earlier medieval structure that had been replaced in 1760.

=== Relocation ===
The idea of demolishing St Werburgh's was a central component of a wider series of "Street Improvement Schemes" undertaken by the Bristol Corporation in the 1870s to modernise the city's medieval layout. By 1876, the council had identified a need to alleviate gridlock in the city centre and to connect the railway terminus at Temple Meads with the commercial districts. The junction of Corn Street and Small Street, where the church stood, was identified as a critical bottleneck preventing the extension of the Bristol Tramways from the Centre to Bristol Bridge. The proposed works, which also included the widening of Redcliff Street and the creation of a new thoroughfare at Baldwin Street, required the Corporation to borrow £134,500. The justification for the removal was strengthened by the decline of the parish, with the congregation having dwindled to just eighteen parishioners in 1871, none of whom were ratepayers.

Negotiations for the sale of the site were protracted and contentious. The vestry of St Werburgh's initially entered a provisional agreement with the Corporation, but following higher offers from private banks, the Lord Chancellor ruled that the vestry was obliged to accept the highest market price. Consequently, the West of England and South Wales Bank purchased the site, and the Corporation was forced to negotiate a new building line with the commercial owners to secure the necessary road widening. This delay was criticised by the local press as a "shilly-shally course" that ultimately increased the cost to the ratepayer. The Lord Chancellor made his consent to the sale conditional on the church being rebuilt elsewhere.

The demolition plan itself faced significant opposition from heritage groups. A preservation movement was led by the Bristol and Gloucestershire Archaeological Society under the notion that the tower formed a unique architectural group with other city towers. The society raised £1,800 in an attempt to save the tower in situ, but the city surveyor advised that retaining the tower would depreciate the value of the remaining redevelopment site, and the offer was rejected.

The final service at Corn Street was held on the evening of 12 August 1877, conducted by the Rev. Thomas Bowman. The building was subsequently demolished, and the stones were numbered before being transported to the new site approximately 2 miles (3.2 km) away in Mina Road, Baptist Mills. During the removal of the church, 100 coffins and 40 chests of human remains were uncovered. These were reburied at Greenbank Cemetery.

The redevelopment of the old site faced further legal challenges before it became the Lloyds Bank building; the committee of the Commercial Rooms obtained injunctions restraining the bank from building over the adjacent passage or raising their premises to a height that would obscure the reading room's light. The dispute lasted three years, resulting in the bank's new headquarters being left effectively unfinished relative to its original design.

=== Baptist Mills ===
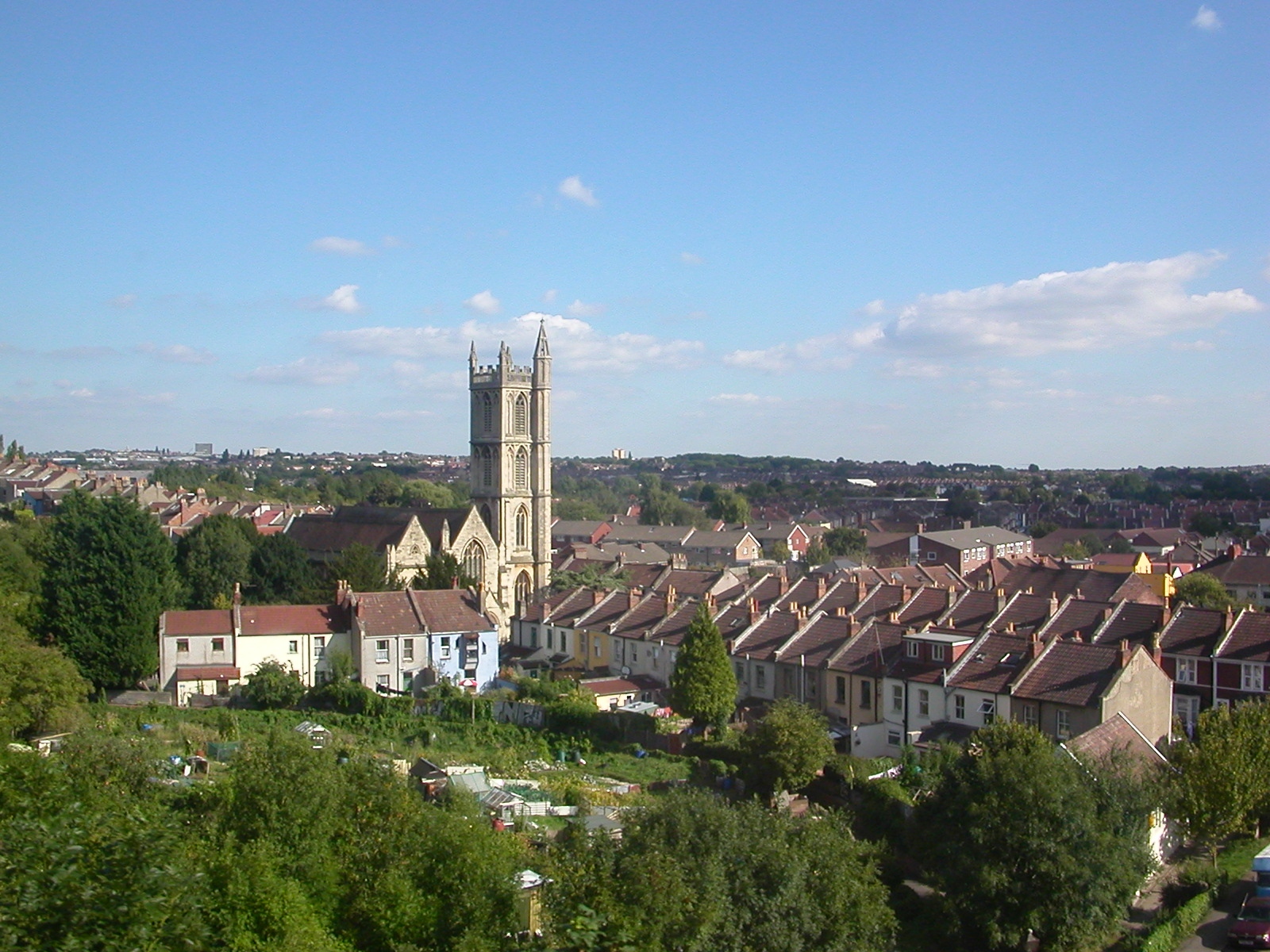
The skyline of what was once Baptist Mills, now St Werburgh's, with the relocated church

The new church was constructed under the direction of the architect John Bevan and built by Messrs. Wilkins and Sons. Parts of the original building, particularly the tower, were re-used in the construction. The decision to reproduce the entire church immediately, rather than in phases, caused the project to exceed its funding by £1,000, a cost the churchwardens deemed necessary to avoid the expense of re-erecting scaffolding later. It was reconsecrated at the new site by the Bishop of Gloucester and Bristol on 30 September 1879.

The selection of the new site was intended to serve a rapidly growing, working-class population. Speaking at a fundraising bazaar in 1881, the Mayor of Bristol, Joseph Dodge Weston, noted that the relocation addressed the tendency of the wealthy to move to the suburbs while leaving the poor behind in the city, stating that the new church would serve those "[left] to themselves". The project soon incurred significant debt, and by 1881, £550 was still owed for the building and the reconstruction of the organ, necessitating public fundraising.

Throughout the course of the 20th century, the church underwent various modifications and repairs. In January 1940, the Bishop of Bristol dedicated a new side chapel in the north aisle, designed by the architect J. Ralph Edwards and constructed by William Cowlin & Son. By 1955, the stonework, particularly at the east end, was suffering from serious decay attributed to fumes from nearby industrial works. The parish, described then as "poor," proceeded to launch a £4,000 appeal for repairs. The church celebrated the centenary of its relocation in September 1979 with a festival and a fundraising drive for heating improvements.

By the late 1980s, the church faced redundancy alongside St Paul's Church on Portland Square. The two were linked in a team ministry with St Agnes, and the decision was made to concentrate resources on St Agnes. St Werburgh's held its final service on Remembrance Sunday, 13 November 1988, after which it was de-consecrated. Despite the closure, the church bells continued to be rung weekly by a local team into 1989, as the building awaited its new use.

== Climbing centre ==
Following the church's de-consecration in 1988, the building remained empty for four years. In 1991, a proposal was submitted by the company Undercover Rock to convert the structure into an indoor climbing facility.

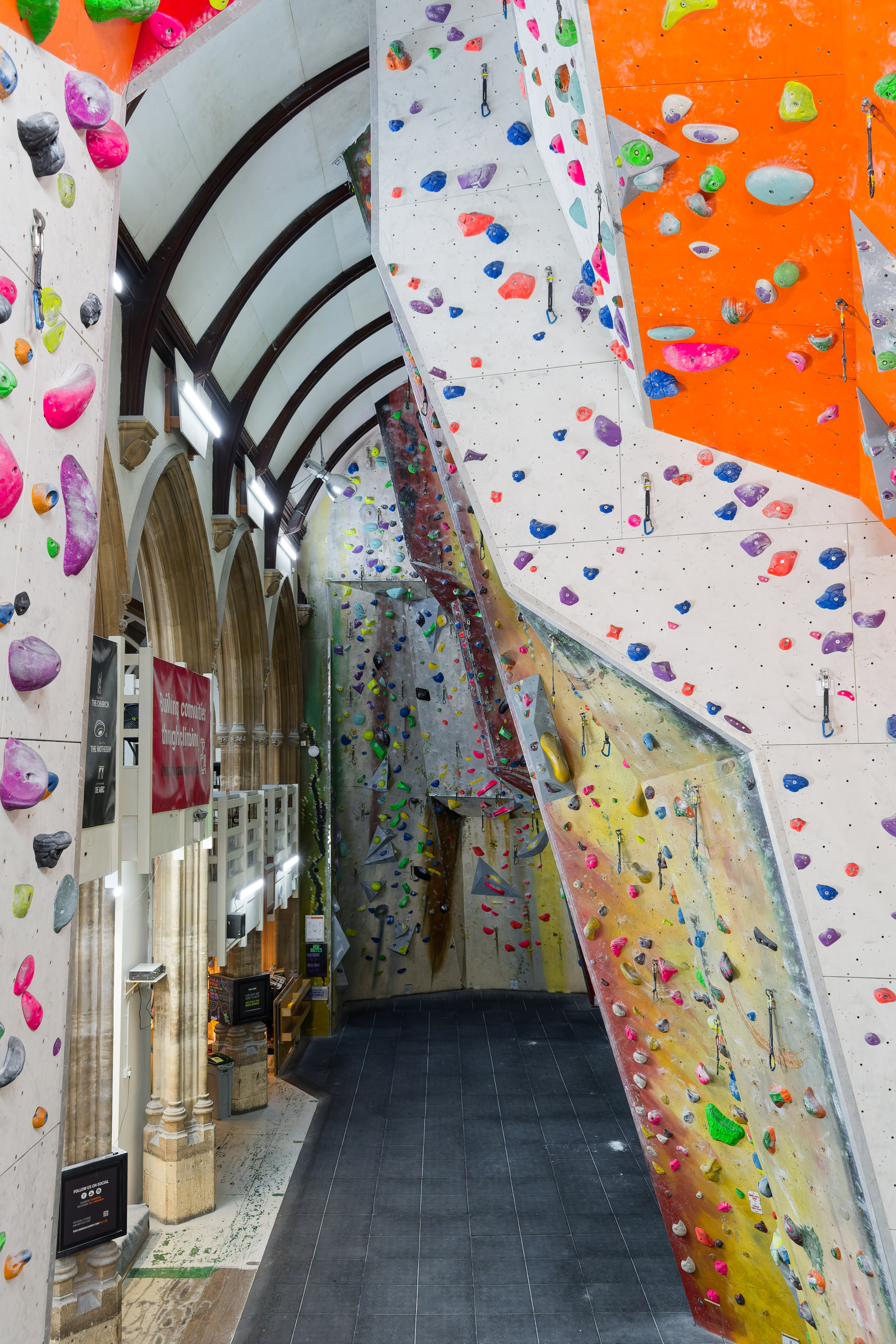
A present-day view of the nave, looking east-to-west, which is now dominated by the climbing infrastructure

=== Conversion and opening ===
The conversion was led by climbers Rob and Lisa Parker and Julian Walker, who sought to address a lack of indoor climbing facilities in the West of England. The project required sensitivity to the historic fabric of the building; planning permission was granted with the condition that the climbing structures be free-standing and that climbing directly on the church stonework was prohibited. Protective screens were installed to cover the historic organ case and ornamental facings.

The centre, originally named the Bristol Climbing Centre (and later Undercover Rock), opened in February 1992. At the time of opening, it was one of only two such facilities in the United Kingdom. The design utilised the 40 feet (12 m) height of the church's apex, installing plywood walls resembling rock faces that rose to 12 metres (39 ft), while the original pews were retained for use in the cafe and viewing area.

=== Change of ownership ===
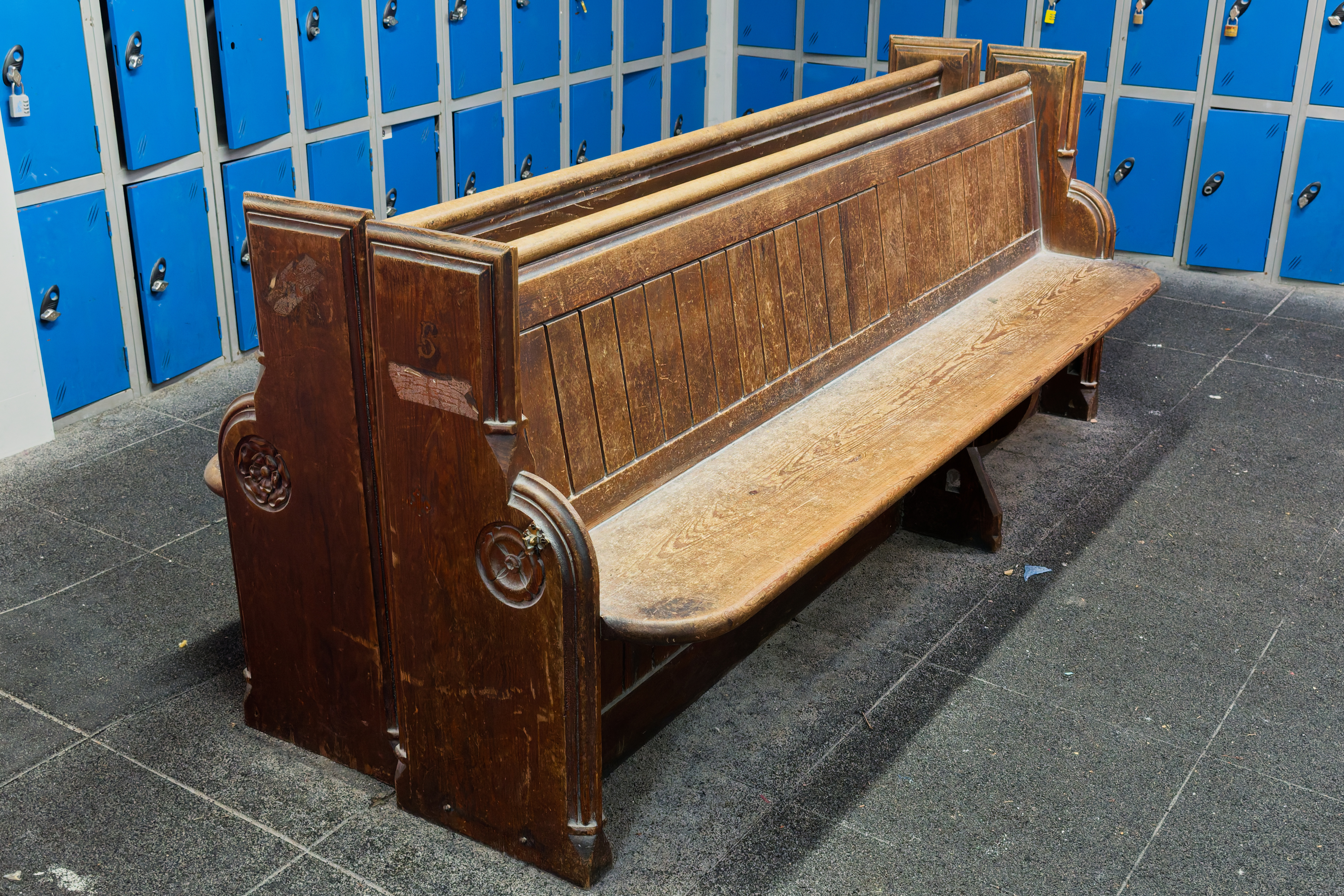
The original benches and pews of the church are still in use for changing room seating

In 2016, the site was acquired by The Climbing Academy (TCA), and it was rebranded as The Church. TCA also operates The Mothership bouldering centre in Bristol, The Propstore and The Newsroom climbing centres in Glasgow, and The Arc climbing centre in Chippenham. In 2024, the centre underwent renovations to upgrade the bouldering area, which included the installation of MoonBoard climbing walls.

In June 2025, TCA announced the sale of both its Bristol sites, including St Werburgh's, to the Flashpoint Climbing Group. TCA cited economic pressures as the reason for the disposal. The sale was scheduled for completion in late September 2025, with the facility rebranding under Flashpoint ownership. However, the sale did not complete and remains as The Climbing Academy.

== Architecture and fittings ==
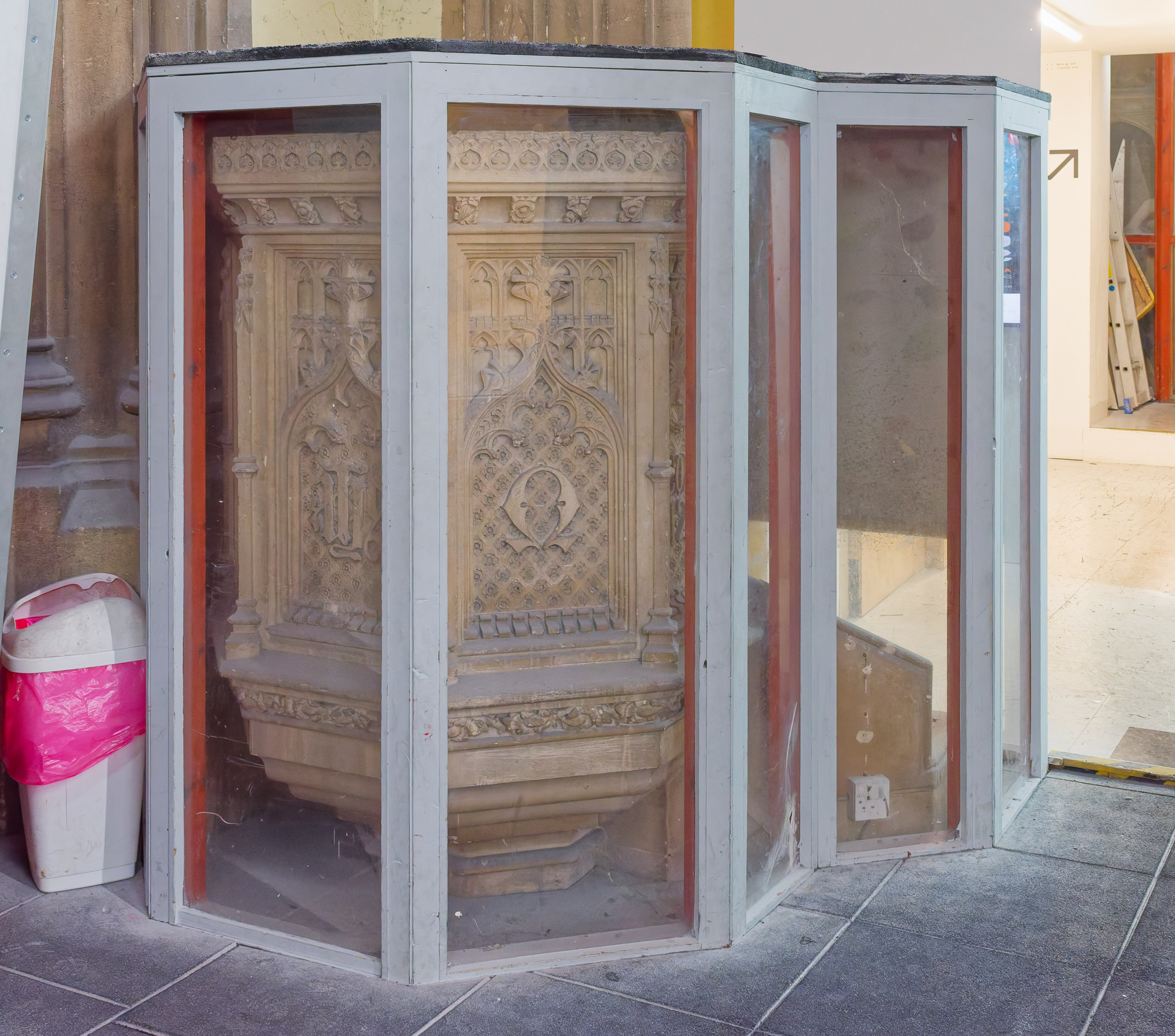
The pulpit, installed during the 1879 reconstruction, features marble columns and remains in the centre today, albeit behind transparent acrylic

The church is built of ashlar limestone in a Perpendicular Gothic Revival style. The 1879 construction, undertaken by Messrs. Wilkins and Sons under the direction of architect John Bevan, utilised Bath stone while incorporating materials from the Corn Street site where possible. While the relocation was intended to be a faithful reproduction, Bevan introduced significant alterations to restore what he interpreted as the building's medieval character.

=== Exterior ===
The plan consists of an aisled nave, a chancel with an organ chamber and vestry, a west porch, and a south-west tower. The orientation of the church was changed from its original site, and a new west elevation and porch were added.

Bevan lengthened the nave by one bay (approximately 19 feet (5.8 m)), increasing the length to 79 feet (24 m) and the seating capacity to 650. A distinct chancel (25 feet (7.6 m) long by 20 feet (6.1 m) wide) was added, a feature the Corn Street building had lacked due to road widening in the 18th century. The fenestration was also modified; the architect added mullions to the upper parts of the windows to correct what he considered to be "poor fifteenth-century work" in the previous structure, filling them with tinted cathedral glass in geometric patterns.

The five-stage tower is the most significant survival of the original fabric, dating to the late 14th century. It rises to a height of 90 feet (27 m) and features an octagonal stair turret which Bevan relocated from the north-west to the south-west angle for structural support. During the reconstruction, Bevan reinstated a "hollow-worked pinnacle" or cupola to the centre of the tower's summit, based on apparent historical evidence of its existence prior to the 1760 renovation. The tower retains a peal of six bells which were transferred from the Corn Street site in 1878. The ring features bells cast in 1696 by Gloucester founder Abraham Rudhall I of Rudhall of Gloucester. The oldest bell in the tower is of pre-Reformation origin, with 20th-century parish records dating it to c. 1450. In 1955, the parish proposed adding two new bells to complete the octave as a memorial to the dead of the Second World War, but the plan was abandoned due to the technical difficulty of tuning modern castings those of the medieval bells.

=== Interior ===
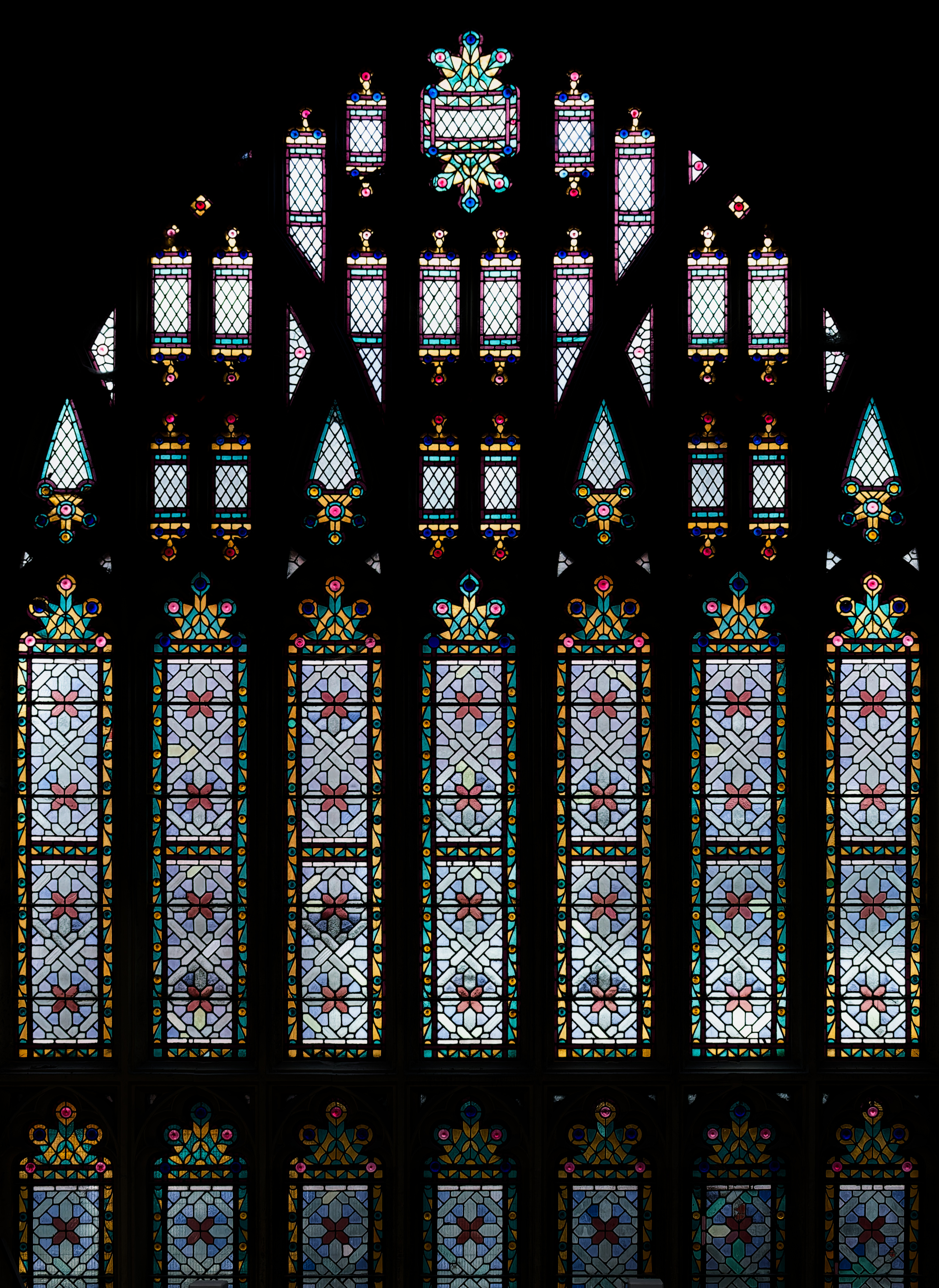
The east window of the building, an example of the style of cathedral glass fitted throughout the church

The interior features a roof of pitch pine with carved figures of angels supporting the main ribs, replacing the original oak roof of which no record remains. The flooring covers a purpose-built crypt and muniment room beneath the north aisle, designed to house the monuments and human remains transferred from the old city site.

The fittings installed for the 1879 consecration included a font of carved Caen stone and an octagonal stone pulpit placed on a pedestal with marble columns, both of which remain in the building. Lighting was originally provided by nine gas lamps, and the windows were glazed with tinted cathedral glass featuring geometric patterns and roundels. The reredos, stencilled with the Decalogue and Creed, was installed in 1879, though a new reredos depicting the Last Supper was dedicated by the Lord Mayor of Bristol in March 1913.

Several monuments were relocated to the new building, including the 17th-century altar-tomb of John Barker, placed in the north aisle, and a brass memorial to Nicholas Thorne, the founder of Bristol Grammar School. During the 1758 renovation, the copper smelter William Reeve was accused of taking fragments of the church to build his stables at Arnos Court (see Arnos Manor Hotel), and allegedly attempted to remove the Thorne monument before being stopped.

== See also ==
- Churches in Bristol
- Grade II* listed buildings in Bristol
