= Henry Bridges (clockmaker) =

Henry Bridges (1697–1754) was a carpenter, showman and clockmaker of Waltham Abbey, England. He was father of James Bridges, architect and engineer. Henry is famous as the builder of the giant clock, the Microcosm. He is buried with his wife in the churchyard of Waltham Abbey, the largest monument there, which was restored several years ago by a local clockmaker. The clock was on tour from 1733 until 1775 and was seen by thousands of people in England, Ireland, Scotland, The West Indies, and North America including George Washington and Richard Edgeworth who wrote an account of it in his memoirs. All trace had been lost of it until found in the 1920s in Paris. The astronomical part is now on display in the British Museum. Henry Married Sarah Trevise, whose family provided him with a large house in Waltham Abbey. In his will of 1754 he left a number of properties in and around Waltham Cross. There is a similar mystery about his son's work history before his arrival in Bristol. James was a highly talented architect and civil engineer who claimed he was taught by his father and that he had seen the works of the ancients, suggesting he had done the Grand Tour. Given the closeness of Waltham Abbey Gunpowder Works, it is possible the Bridges family were involved in the very lucrative secretive business of gunpowder manufacture.

The design was incredibly complex, the only similar monumental clock was by Jacob Lovelace of Exeter, suggesting some form of links with and inspiration from the Christian Church. It also coincided with European automata arriving to tour, some of which were fraudulent, so the Microcosm demonstrated Britain at the time, but also inspired viewers to learn and improve their skills, to recover what had been lost in the Reformation and Civil War. It was an important demonstration piece, and part of a world of touring science and technology which filled the absence of royal and aristocratic patronage.
