= Arno's Court Triumphal Arch =

Triumphal arch in Bristol, England

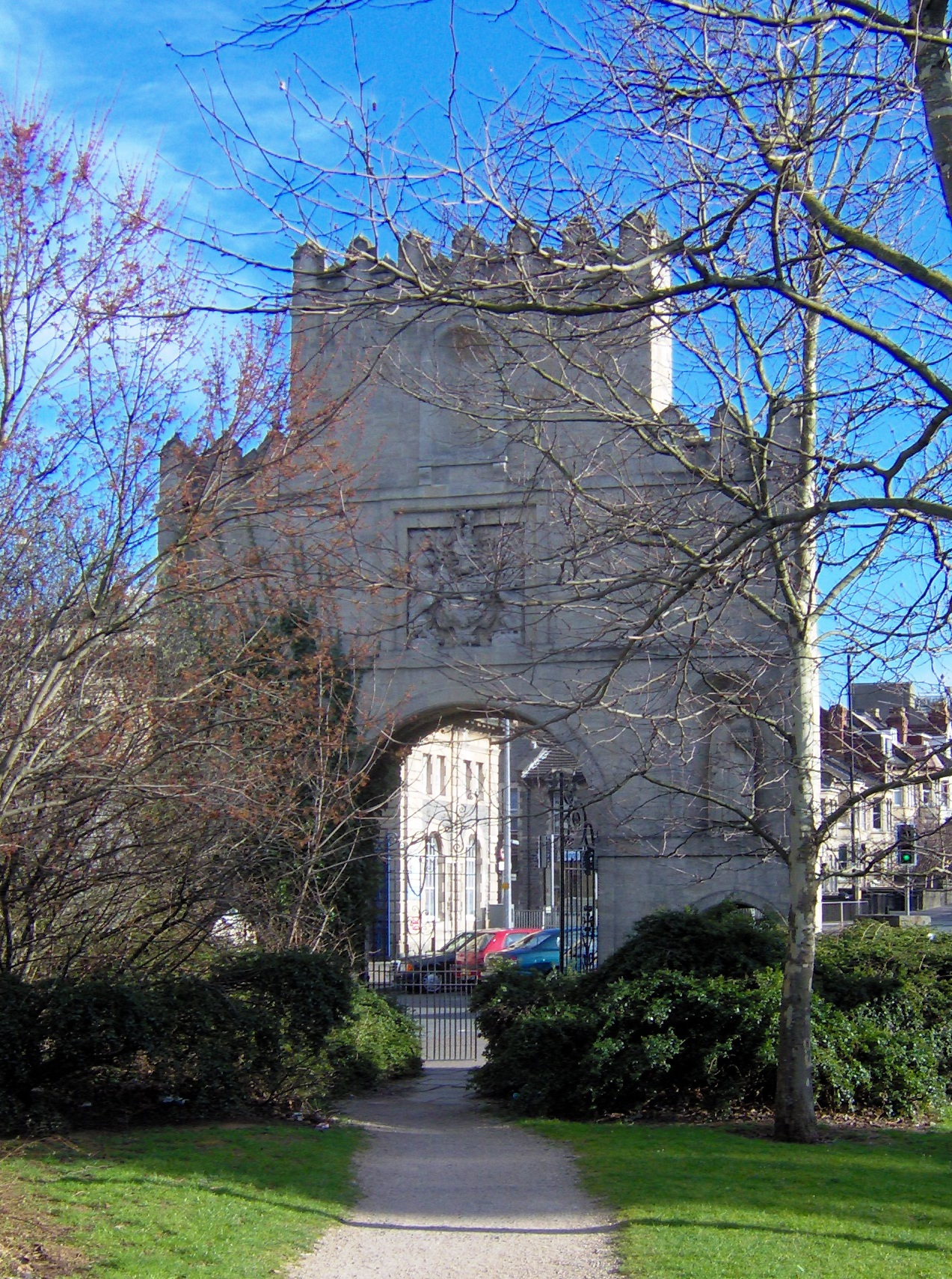
- Rear of Arno's Court Triumphal Arch

- Location within Bristol

General information
- Location: Brislington, Bristol, England
- Coordinates: 51°26′31″N 2°33′37″W
- Completed: c. 1760
- Renovated: 1995
- Client: William Reeve

Design and construction
- Architect: James Bridges

Listed Building – Grade II*
- Official name: Arno's Court Triumphal Arch
- Designated: 8 January 1959
- Reference no.: 1203684

Arno's Court Triumphal Arch (grid reference ST612716) is an 18th-century monument on Junction Road in Brislington, Bristol, England.

== Description ==
The arch was built around 1760 by James Bridges, for William Reeve, a prominent local Quaker and businessman. It is built from Bath stone, of classical proportions but with Gothic and Moorish detail.

In its current position, next to the main A4 road, it marked the entrance to the (since demolished) Arno's Court Bath House. A plaque on the arch states that it was moved from its original position, at the entrance to the Black Castle, in 1912 and was fully renovated in 1995.

The arch was designated a Grade II* listed building in 1959.

== Carvings ==
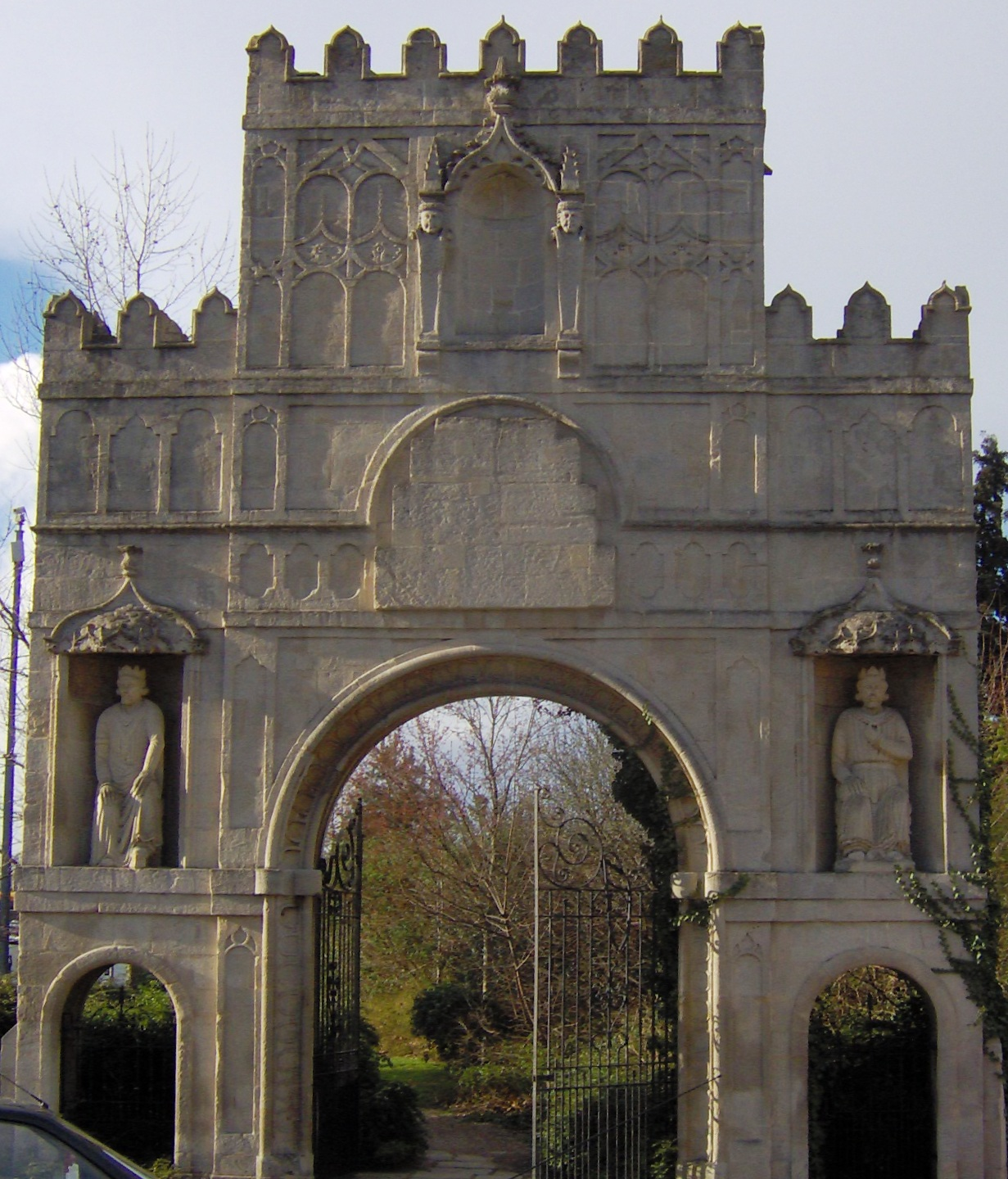
Front of the arch

The niches on each side of the arch once contained carvings from the demolished City Gates. The rear elevation is much simpler than the front, and includes a carving of the city's coat of arms.

The four statues which decorate the archway are 20th-century copies of 13th and 14th-century originals. The original statues of King Edward I and King Edward III were set in one of the deep niches on the western side that have tent-like canopies. The original statues were taken from Bristol's Lawford's Gate that was demolished around the time of construction of the arch. Those on the east-side are 13th-century figures from Bristol's Newgate, representing Robert, the builder of Bristol Castle, and Geoffrey de Montbray, bishop of Coutances, builder of the fortified walls of Bristol. The originals of all four were removed due to their deteriorating condition in 1898 and they are now in the St Nicholas's Church Museum.

== See also ==
- Grade II* listed buildings in Bristol
