= Arnos Manor Hotel =

Hotel in Bristol, England

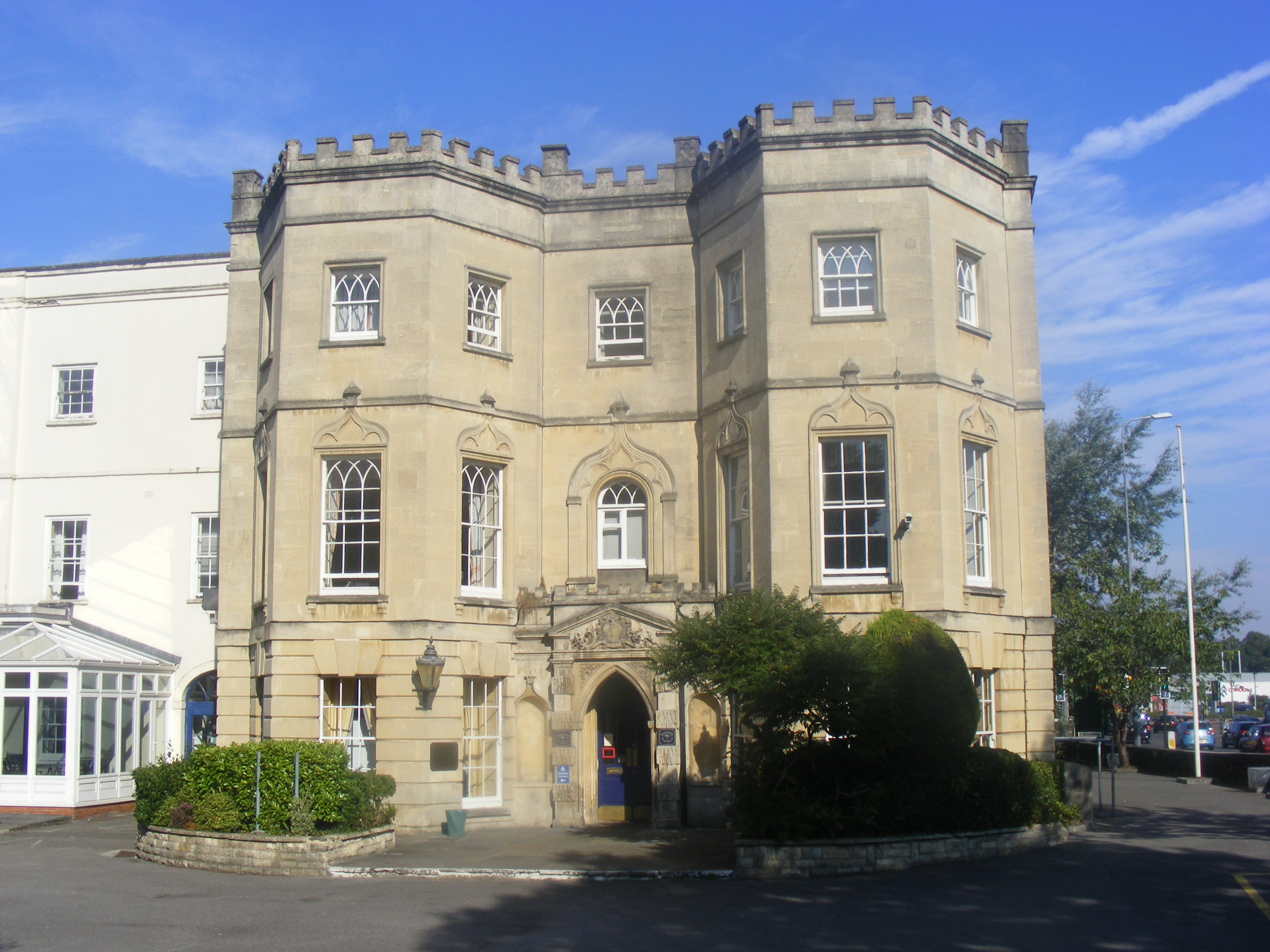
- Arnos Manor Hotel in 2011

- Location within Bristol
- Former names: Mount Pleasant; Arnos Court; Arno's Court

General information
- Architectural style: Gothic Revival
- Location: Brislington, Bristol, England
- Coordinates: 51.4415°N 2.5608°W
- Year built: 17th–19th centuries
- Governing body: Private

Design and construction
- Architect: Attributed to James Bridges

Listed Building – Grade II*
- Official name: Arnos Manor Hotel
- Designated: 8 January 1959
- Reference no.: 1201988

Listed Building – Grade I
- Official name: Black Castle Public House (formerly the stables to Arnos Court)
- Designated: 8 January 1959
- Reference no.: 1292881

Listed Building – Grade II*
- Official name: Arno's Court Triumphal Arch (formerly the entrance gate to Arnos Court)
- Designated: 8 January 1959
- Reference no.: 1203684

Listed Building – Grade II
- Official name: Former convent at rear of Arnos Manor Hotel
- Designated: 8 January 1959
- Reference no.: 1203961

Listed Building – Grade II*
- Official name: The Bristol Colonnade (formerly the frontage of the Arnos Court bathhouse, now at Portmeirion)
- Designated: 14 January 1971
- Reference no.: 4878

Arnos Manor Hotel (formerly Mount Pleasant, Arnos Court or Arno's Court) is an 18th-century house, now a hotel, in Brislington, a southern suburb of Bristol, England. The original house dates from the 17th century. In around 1740 the estate was bought by William Reeve, a Bristol industrialist, who converted the first house to a service wing and built a new mansion next to it. Reeve's architect was likely James Bridges. In the 1760s, Reeve embellished the estate with the construction of a stable block in the form of a mock castle, now the Black Castle public house; an entrance archway, the Arno's Court Triumphal Arch; a bathhouse with a colonnaded frontage; and by giving the front of his new house an early Gothick makeover. The hotel is a Grade II* listed building, while the Black Castle pub is listed at Grade I, and the Triumphal Arch at Grade II*. The bathhouse was demolished in the 1950s, when its colonnaded façade was moved to Portmeirion in North Wales. This structure is also listed at Grade II*.

== History ==
The original house on the Arnos Court site dated from the 17th century. In around 1740 the estate was bought by William Reeve, who had made his money through the production of copper and brass. Reeve repurposed the original house as a service wing and built a new house adjoining it in a neoclassical style. His architect may have been James Bridges. In the 1760s, Reeve redeveloped the estate as a pleasure ground, using an early Gothic Revival style. Andrew Foyle, in his Somerset: North and Bristol volume in the Pevsner Buildings of England series, revised and re-issued in 2011, suggests the Gothic work may have been by the Bristolian builders, Thomas and James Paty. (Note: The use of a Gothic Revival style in the 1760s was progressive. Horace Walpole, who later described the Arnos stables as the "Devil's Cathedral", had begun "Gothicising" Strawberry Hill House only ten years earlier.) Developments included a stable block in a castellated style, constructed from compressed slag generated from Reeve's metal furnaces, and an entrance arch which contains some genuine medieval fragments. The court itself was given a "superficial" Gothic makeover.

The estate was heavily developed in the 20th century, and the bathhouse Reeves had constructed in the grounds was demolished, its façade salvaged by Clough Williams-Ellis who re-erected it in the grounds of his fantasy village, Portmeirion, on the North Wales coast. The stables, now a public house, were separated from the court by a road widening scheme for the A4, and the arch was moved to its present location. The court is now a hotel.

== Architecture and description ==
Arnos Court Hotel is a three-storey main block, with an attached service wing. The planning is entirely classical, but the main house has what Foyle describes as a "superficial Gothic trim". The building was extended to the rear in the 19th century when it was used as a convent. (Note: The chapel of the former convent now houses the hotel's snooker room.)

Arnos Manor Hotel is a Grade II* listed building. The Black Castle pub is listed at Grade I, and the Triumphal Arch is at Grade II*. The colonnaded façade of the bathhouse, now at Portmeirion, is also listed at Grade II*. The former convent building is listed at Grade II.

== Gallery ==
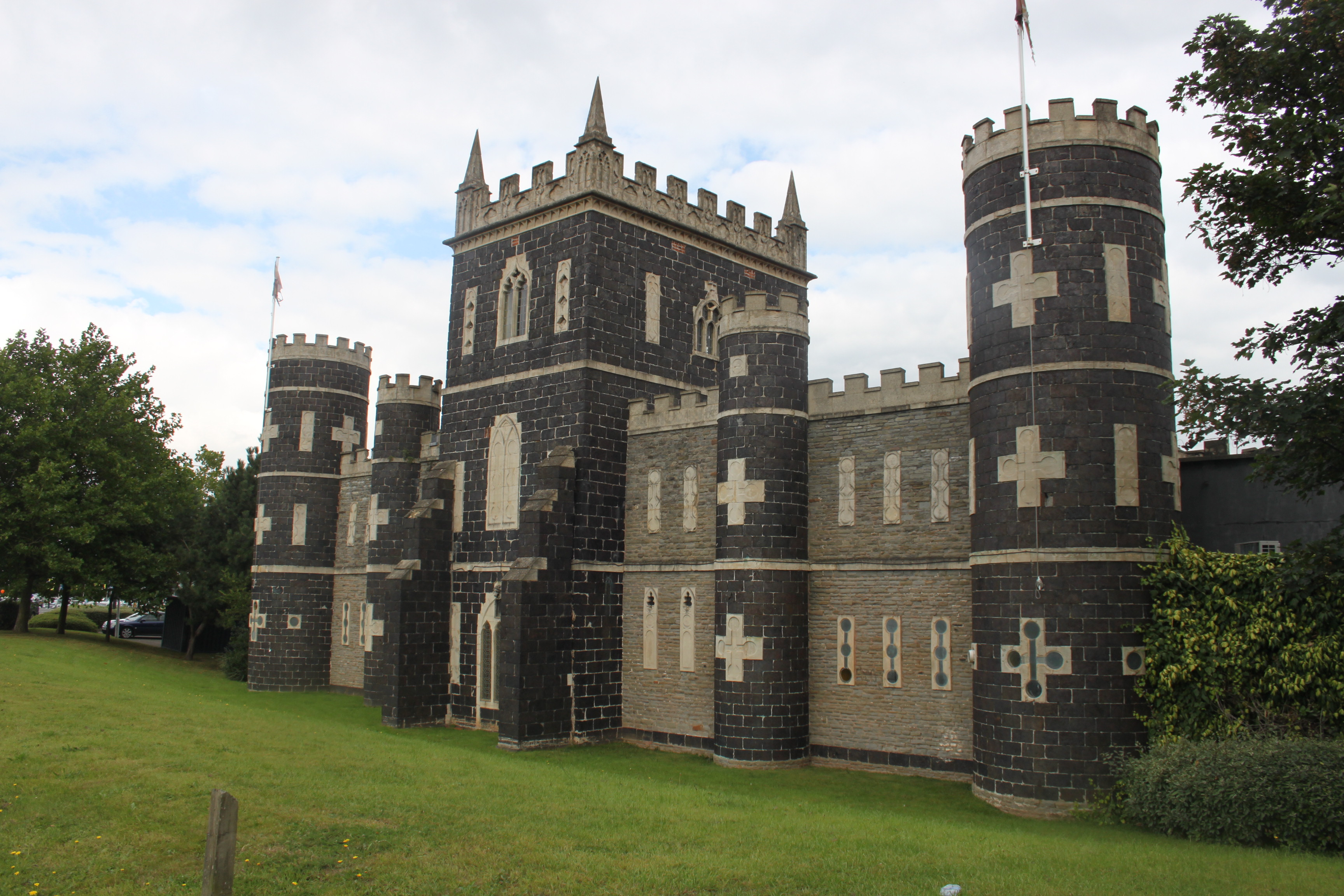
The former stables to Arnos Court, now the Black Castle pub

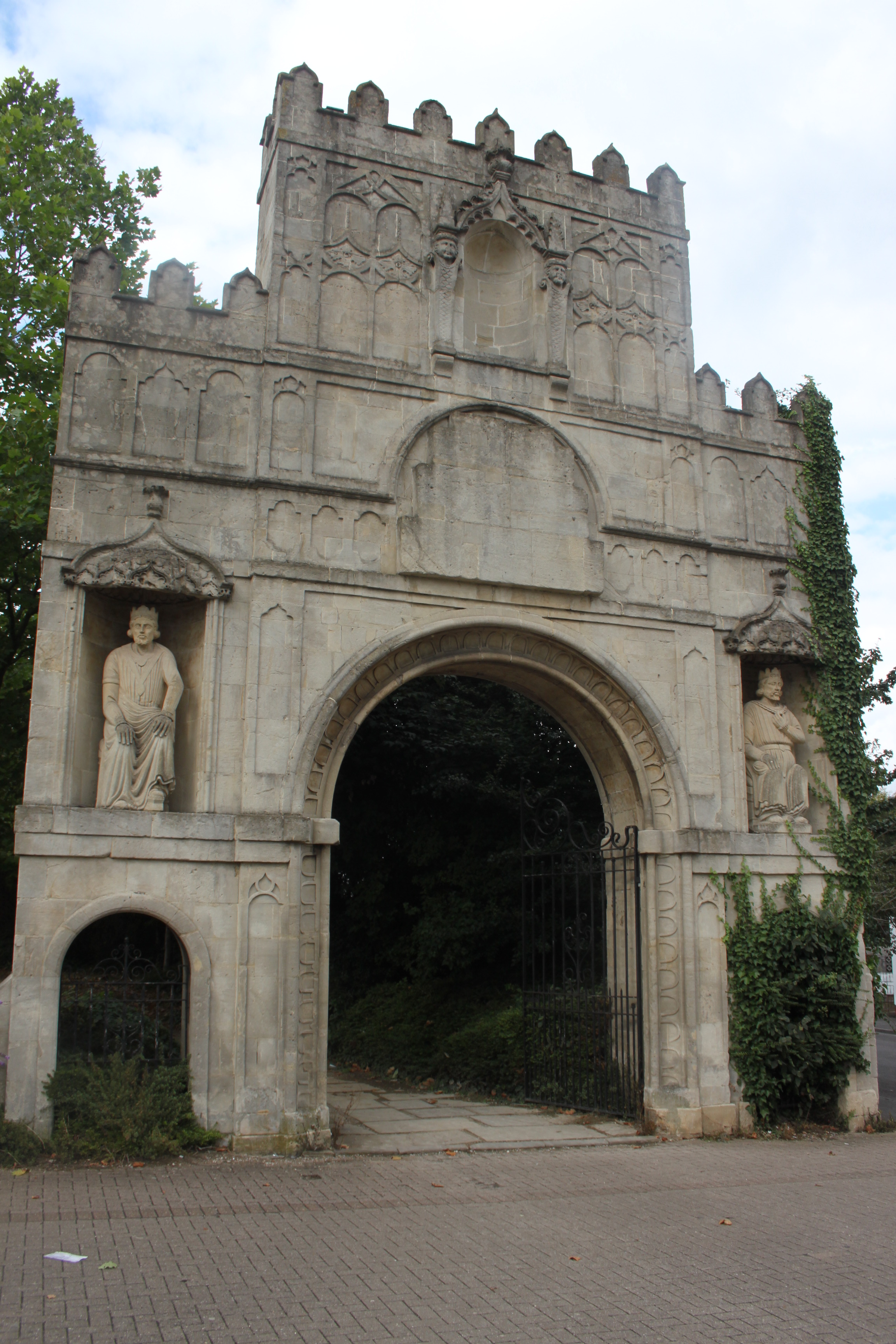
The former entrance gate to Arnos Court

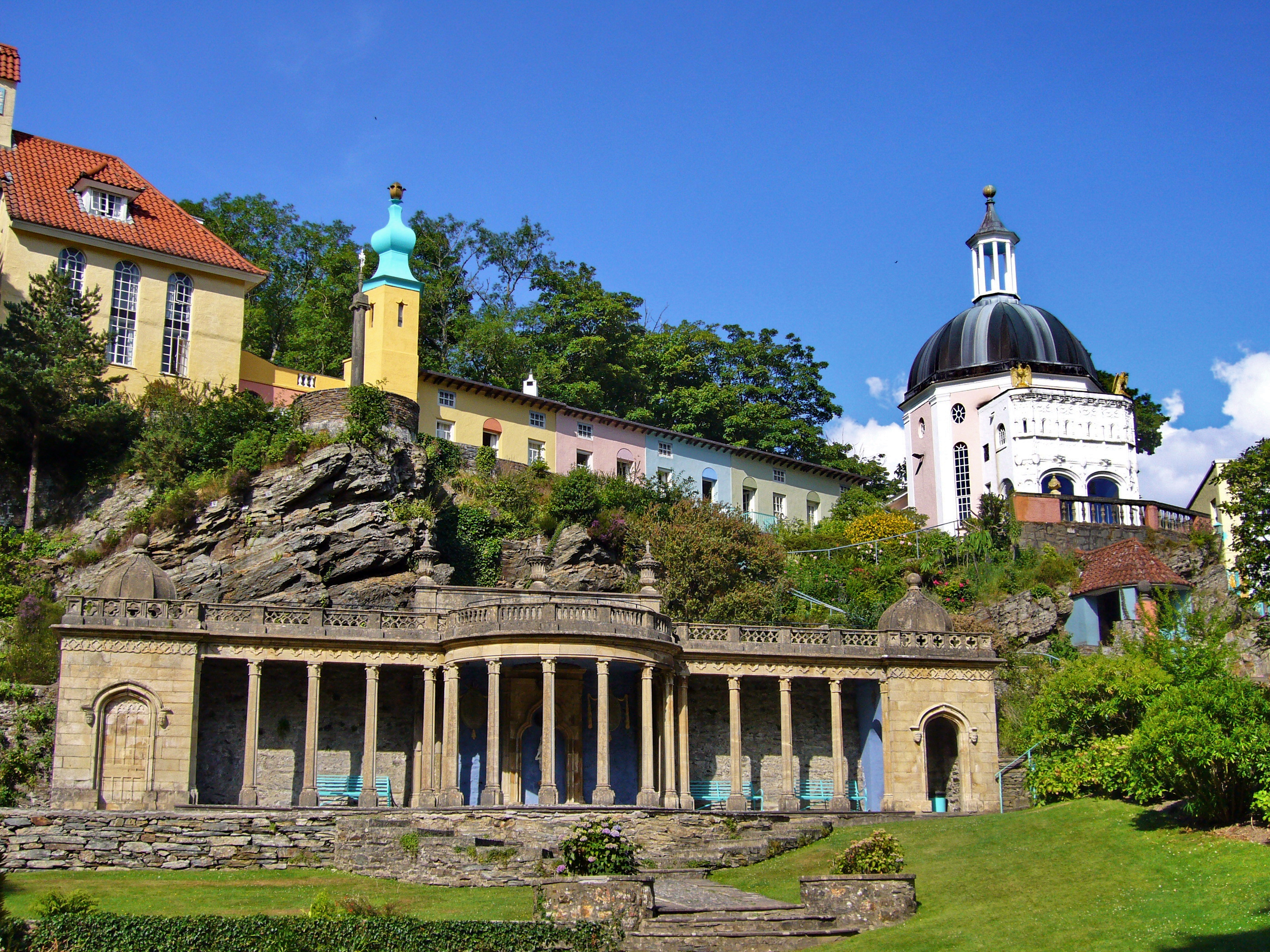
The frontage to the former Arnos Court bathhouse, now at Portmeirion, Wales

== See also ==
- Arno's Court Triumphal Arch (the former entrance gate)
- Black Castle, Bristol (the former stables)
- Grade II* listed buildings in Bristol
- List of buildings and structures in Portmeirion (the site of the Bristol Colonnade)

== Sources ==
- Foyle, Andrew; Pevsner, Nikolaus (2011). Somerset: North and Bristol. Pevsner Buildings of England. New Haven, US and London: Yale University Press. ISBN 978-0-300-12658-7. OCLC 751716531.
