= Microcosm (clock) =

Microcosm was a unique clock made by Henry Bridges of Waltham Abbey, England. It stood 10–12 feet high, and six across the base, it toured Great Britain, North America and possibly Europe as a visual and musical entertainment as well as demonstrating astronomical movements.

It was first advertised for exhibition in 1733, but it is also claimed that Sir Isaac Newton, who died in 1727, checked the mechanism. Several prints survive of Microcosm including one of 1734 showing Newton and Bridges. When Henry Bridges died in 1754 he left the clock to his three youngest children to be sold. It is unclear when the clock left the Bridges family but it continued touring until 1775 when it vanished. Parts of the astronomical clock were found in Paris in 1929 and are now in the British Museum.

When on tour, the entrance fee was 1s, which was high for the time. Souvenir pamphlets were also sold. It had 4 parts, from the top:

1. Three scenes which alternated: nine muses playing musical instruments, Orpheus in the forest, and a grove with birds flying and singing
2. Beneath a grand arch were two astronomical clocks, one showing the Ptolemaic system, the other Copernican.
3. Two planetariums, one showing the Solar System, showing 10 months move in 10 minutes, Another showing Jupiter and its four satellites, and on the front face was a seascape with ships sailing and in the foreground, horse-drawn carriages galloping and a gunpowdermill and a windmill turning, swans swimming
4. In the pedestal was a working carpenters’ yard

The machine played mechanical music but the organ could also be played by hand. The music was mostly new, some composed especially for it.

John R Milburn stated: ‘There were other broadly similar though less comprehensive devices in existence in the first half of the eighteenth century… The importance of Bridges’ ‘Microcosm’, however, lies in the nature of its displays (combining automated pictures to attract the multitude with educational astronomical models) and the widespread publicity that accompanied it on its travels’.

It was viewed by George Washington, and by members of the Lunar Society; Richard L Edgeworth left an account of seeing it at Chester in his biography, so links it with the notions of child-centred education promoted by Rousseau.

The mechanism was constantly being updated, so was part of the circuit of travelling science shows of the early to mid 18th century, providing education to the public who could afford it.
