= Thomas Paty =

British surveyor, architect and mason (c.1713–1789)

- Born: c. 1713
- Died: 4 May 1789 (aged 75–76)
- Occupation: Architect

Thomas Paty (c. 1713 – 4 May 1789) was a British surveyor, architect and mason working mainly in Bristol. He worked with his sons John Paty and William Paty.

== Career ==
Thomas Paty came from a family of builders but little is known of his origins. He was responsible for building many of the 18th century buildings in Bristol, and his sons, John and William, joined the business. He and his family were involved in the parish life of St Augustine's Church and contributed to various charities. The business prospered and spread to South Gloucestershire, Wales and Somerset. It seems to have been successful at a time when other firms collapsed after the end of the Napoleonic Wars and many builders went out of business. They were also involved in the carving of monuments, some as far away as Bury St Edmunds and the West Indies, which allowed them to keep working throughout the winter. Thomas Paty was sometimes accused of a lack of originality, but during his lifetime, Bristol was transformed from a medieval city of wooden houses to a modern city with paved streets, stone buildings and suburbs.

== Bristol Bridge ==
Between 1763 and 1769, James Bridges, and later Thomas Paty who replaced him when he resigned, were involved in the building of Bristol Bridge to replace a medieval structure over the floating harbour, the original course of the River Avon through Bristol. Both these men were described as surveyors, but they played no part in valuing the structures that were taken down, this being the responsibility of a group of master builders who often made use of the salvaged materials. Thomas Paty was the only one of the trustees of the bridge-building project who was in the building trade.

After the bridge was completed, Thomas Paty was involved in the rebuilding of St Nicholas Church which stood beside the end of the bridge. The trustees had set aside £1400 for this but the parish wanted a larger building, the wooden tower was discovered to be rotten and costs increased, the final sum being about £7000.

== Works ==
- The Exchange, Bristol (1741–43)
- Monument to Rothesia Ann Barrington (died 1745); St. Andrew's parish church, Shrivenham, Berkshire
- Monument to William Jones in Church of St Nicholas and the Blessed Virgin Mary, Stowey, Somerset
- Royal Fort, Bristol (1758–61)
- Fonmon Castle, Vale of Glamorgan (1762), with Thomas Stocking
- Bristol Bridge (1763–69), with James Bridges
- St Nicholas, Bristol (1763–69), with James Bridges
- Theatre Royal, Bristol (1764–66)
- Monument to Sir Robert Cocks (died 1765); St. Peter's parish church, Dumbleton, Gloucestershire
- Monument to Thomas Esbury (died 1766); St. Mary's parish church, Hawkesbury, Gloucestershire
- Monument to Edward Peach (died 1770); St. Mary's parish church, Woodchester, Gloucestershire
- St Michael on the Mount Without, Bristol (1775–77)
- Monument to John Nelems (died 1742, monument erected 1778); St. Mary the Virgin, Wotton-under-Edge, Gloucestershire
- Plaque to the Fitzherbert family in the Church of St Mary and St Ethelbert, Luckington, Wiltshire
- 1–5 Beaufort Buildings, Bristol (1780)
- Monument to Thomas Hobby (died 1781); St. Michael's parish church, Hill, Gloucestershire
- Monument to Priscilla Thorne (died 1783); St James Church, Swimbridge, Devon
- Monument to Samuel Peach (died 1785); St. Mary's parish church, Olveston, Gloucestershire
- Monument to Arthur Tucker (died 1785); St. Michael's parish church, Winterbourne, Gloucestershire
- 3–10 Bath Street, Bristol (c. 1792)
- Possibly Ston Easton Park, Somerset
- Memorial to M. Humphrys in Church of St Peter, Langley Burrell, Wiltshire.

== Sources ==
- Colvin, H.M. (1997) [1954]. A Biographical Dictionary of British Architects, 1600–1840. New Haven: Yale University Press. p. not cited. ISBN 0-300-07207-4.
- Foyle, Andrew (2004). Bristol. The Buildings of England. p. not cited. ISBN 0-300-10442-1.
- Pevsner, Nikolaus (1966). Berkshire. The Buildings of England. Harmondsworth: Penguin Books. p. 218.
- Pevsner, Nikolaus; Cherry, Bridget (revision) (1975) [1963]. Wiltshire. The Buildings of England. Harmondsworth: Penguin Books. p. 465. ISBN 0140710264.
- Priest, Gordon (2003). The Paty Family: Makers of Eighteenth-century Bristol. p. not cited.
- Verey, David (1970a). Gloucestershire: The Cotswolds. The Buildings of England. Vol. 1. Harmondsworth: Penguin Books. ISBN 0-14-071040-X.
- Verey, David (1970b). Gloucestershire: The Vale and the Forest of Dean. The Buildings of England. Vol. 2. Harmondsworth: Penguin Books.
