= Bristol Ferry Boats =

Ferry operator in Bristol, England

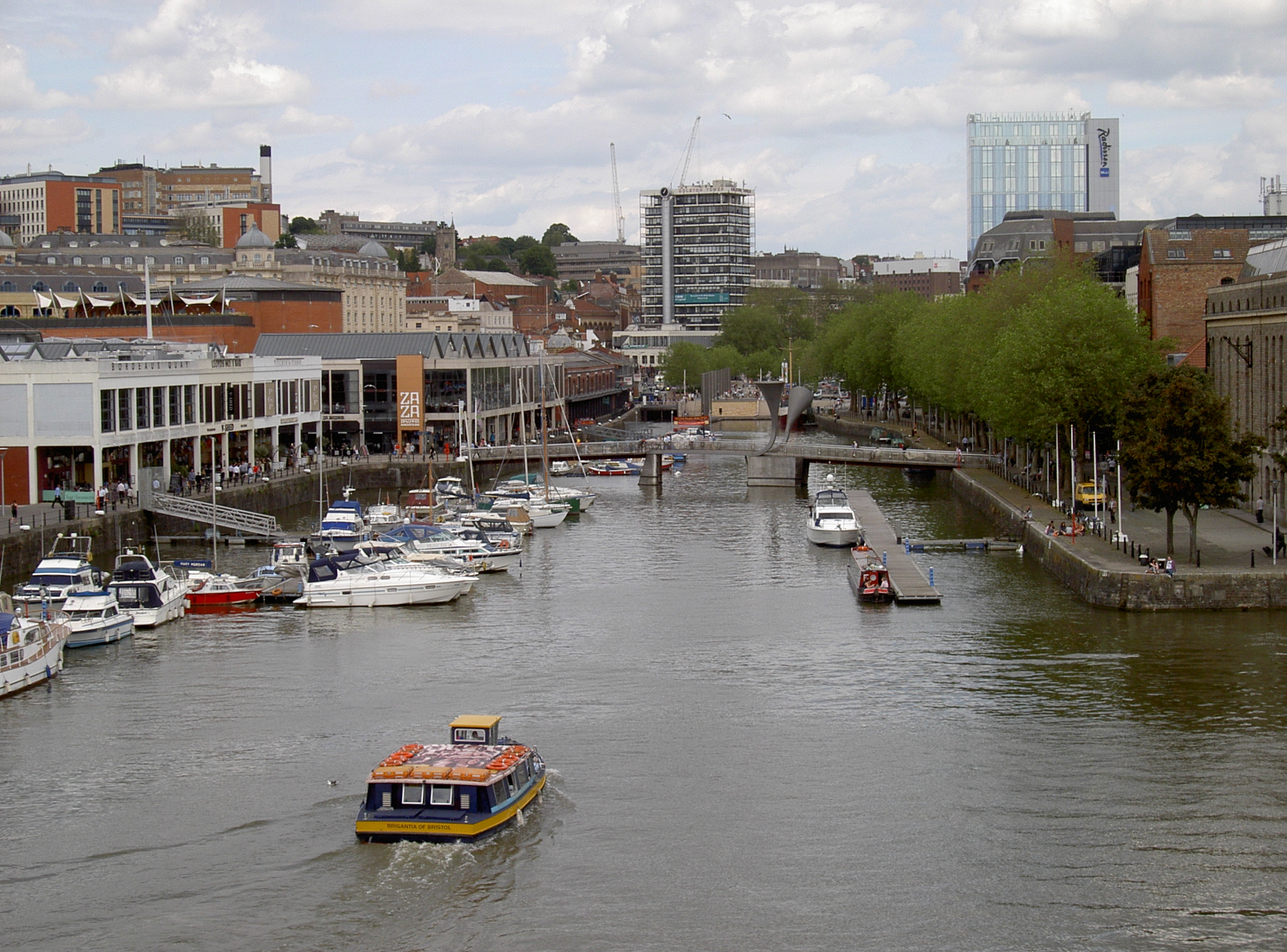
Brigantia heading down St. Augustine's Reach towards the City Centre landing stage

Bristol Ferry Boats is a brand of water bus services operating around Bristol Harbour in the centre of the English city of Bristol, using a fleet of distinctive yellow-and-blue painted ferry boats. The services were formerly owned by the Bristol Ferry Boat Company, but are now the responsibility of Bristol Community Ferry Boats, a community interest company that acquired the fleet of the previous company.

The company operates scheduled ferry services, along with educational and public boat cruises and private hire of boats. Scheduled services operate on two routes linking Bristol city centre to Temple Meads railway station and Hotwells, serving 17 landing stages throughout the length of the harbour, including one at Brunel's famous SS Great Britain. Services are provided on a commercial basis without subsidy and are subject to competition.

== History ==
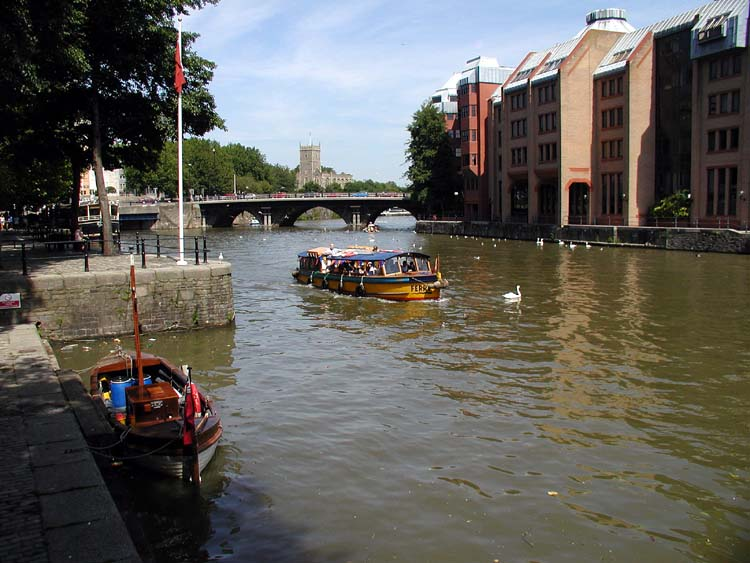
Emily passes the Welsh Back landing stage, with Bristol Bridge in the background

City Docks Ventures, a non-profit making conservation group in Bristol, started the initiative in 1977, with the purchase of the ferry boat Margaret, to be skippered by Ian Bungard. In 1978, Ian Bungard bought Margaret and started to build up the business. In 1980 Margaret was joined by Independence. The ferry service offered all year round leisure, sightseeing, and commuting, as well as private hire, and typified the transformation of Bristol's Floating Harbour from cargo trading vessels to leisure. In 1984 Royal Mail chose an image of Margaret to feature on one of its special edition 'Urban Renewal' stamps; the yellow and blue painted boats had become a well known brand.

In 1992, the company acquired Emily, their first enclosed launch. In 1997 this was joined by Matilda, another enclosed launch and the first vessel purpose built for Bristol Ferry Boats.

In 2002 Ian Bungard sold the business to Rob and Jane Salvidge. From 2002, the company operated additional commuter services to Hotwells and Bristol Temple Meads that were subsidised by, and under contract to, Bristol City Council. In 2004, a cross-harbour shuttle ferry was introduced between SS Great Britain and Capricorn Quay was introduced on the same basis. In 2006, the launch Brigantia joined the fleet, to a design based on that of Matilda. However, in 2007, the contract for the subsidised services was lost to Number Seven Boat Trips, who operated the commuter service until it ceased in 2011 and continue to operate the cross-harbour ferry. Bristol Ferry Boats continued to operate their main commercial services.

In November 2012, the Bristol Ferry Boat Company went into liquidation, with debts of over £10,000 owed to Bristol City Council for navigation and mooring fees, and for office rent. Supporters of the company, including Ian Bungard (the original owner), bought back the fleet at the receivers' auction. In 2013, the campaign to transform the company into community ownership was well oversubscribed. Bristol Community Ferry Boats Limited is the result, now owned by its 871 shareholders from all around Bristol.

== Scheduled services ==
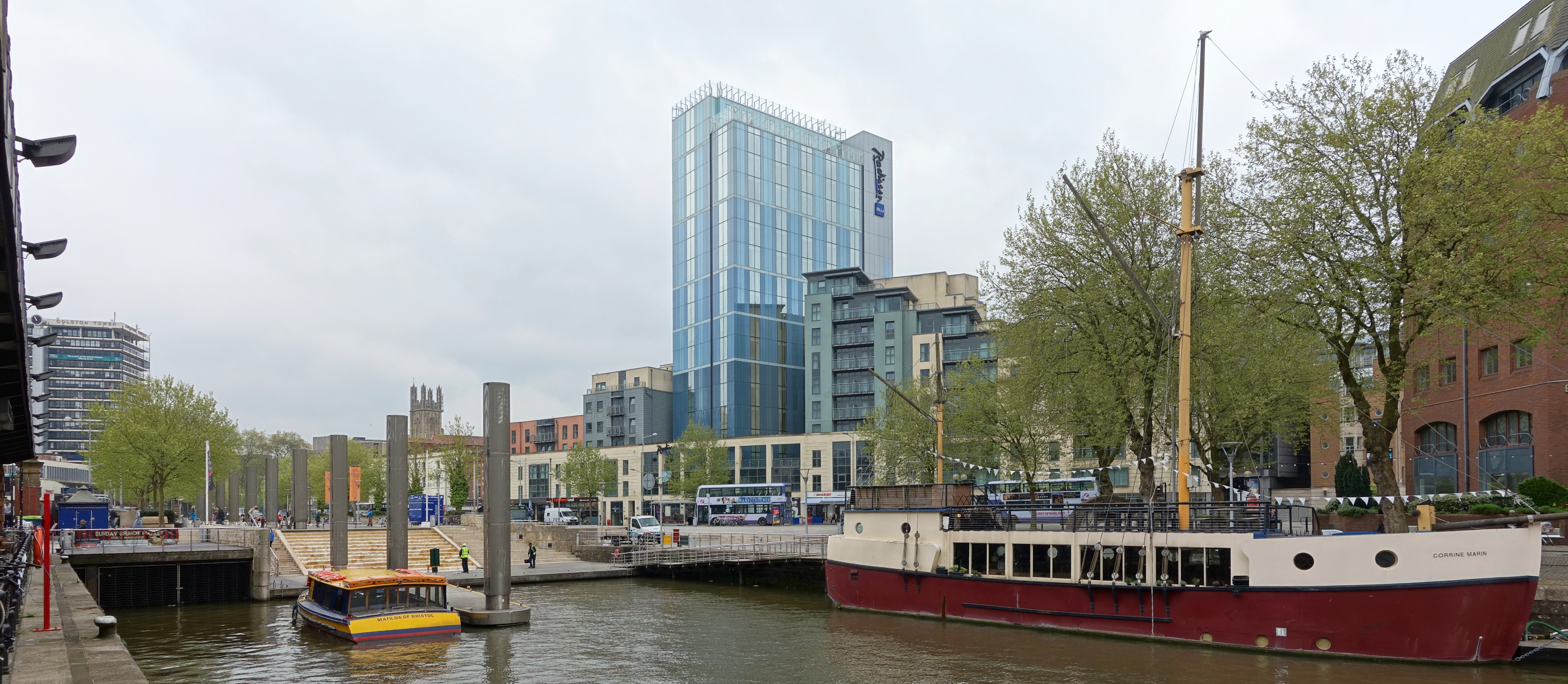
Matilda alongside the City Centre landing stage at the head of St. Augustine's Reach

Bristol Ferry Boats operate 364 days a year, with a single through route linking Temple Meads railway station and Hotwells via Bristol city centre. Services operate every 40 minutes. The following landing stages are served:

#	Landing stage	For
1	City Centre	The Centre, Watershed Arts Centre, Bristol Cathedral, College Green and City Hall
2	Cannons Marsh	Millennium Square and At-Bristol
3	Harbour Inlet	
4	Mardyke	
5	Hotwells-Pumphouse	Hotwells and Clifton Suspension Bridge (20 mins uphill walk)
6	Hotwells-The Nova Scotia	Cumberland Basin and Underfall Yard
7	Hotwells-The Cottage	
8	Marina	Bristol Marina
9	Great Britain	Preserved Brunel steamship Great Britain
10	Wapping Wharf	
11	Prince Street Bridge	Arnolfini Art Gallery, Queen Square, M Shed and Bristol Harbour Railway
12	Bathurst Basin	Bathurst Basin
13	Welsh Back	Welsh Back, Bristol Bridge, Llandoger Trow and St Nicholas Market
14	Redcliffe Back	
15	Castle Park	Castle Park and Broadmead shopping district (with Cabot Circus and Galleries malls)
16	Temple Bridge	Cheese Lane Shot Tower
17	Temple Quay	Bristol Temple Meads railway station

== Fleet ==
The fleet of the Bristol Ferry Boats comprises the following vessels:

Name	Built	Acquired	Passenger Capacity	Notes	Image
Brigantia	2006	2006	48	Steel-hulled enclosed launch. Purpose-built for Bristol Ferry, based on the design for Matilda but equipped with a retractable wheelhouse and a wheelchair lift.	
Emily	1927	1992	48	Wooden-hulled launch, with a length of 11.5 m (38 ft) and a beam of 3.5 m (11 ft). Built by M W Blackmore of Bideford, and previously used at Scarborough and in Gloucester Docks. Originally fully enclosed, a refit in 2022-3 saw part of the roof removed, so as to provide a mixture of open and enclosed seating, and give her the air of a Venice water taxi.	
Independence	1927	1980	46	Wooden-hulled open launch, with a length of 11.5 m (38 ft) and a beam of 2.5 m (8 ft 2 in). Built to operate in the shallow waters of the Severn and Wye, she also ran for a time on the Erewash Canal.	
Juno	1990	2024	48	Wooden‑hulled launch, with a length of 12.5 m (41 ft), a beam of 4.2 m (14 ft), a canopy over the stern section, wheelhouse for the skipper, and open bow. Built in 1990 for service at Whitby as the Oban Marina Ferry, later operated on the River Tees by RiverShack; donated to Bristol Ferry Boats in 2024 and refurbished for service in 2025.	
Margaret	1952	1977	28	Wooden-hulled open launch. Built, by Hinks of Appledore, for service in Lynmouth replacing a vessel wrecked in the flood of 1952, and later used as a ferry across the Avon between Shirehampton and Pill. Rendered redundant by the opening of the Avonmouth Bridge, she moved to the floating harbour in 1977 and became the first of the yellow and blue harbour ferries. She was re-engined in 2005 and given a new keel in 2008.	
Matilda	1997	1997	48	Steel-hulled enclosed launch, with a length of 14.02 m (46.0 ft) and a beam of 4.61 m (15.1 ft). Purpose-built by and for Bristol Ferry at Underfall Yard.	

The Matilda and Brigantia are licensed to operate on the tidal Avon downstream from Bristol through the Avon Gorge to Avonmouth, as well as throughout the floating harbour and on the upstream Avon to Pulteney Weir in the city of Bath. The other vessels are restricted to operating in the floating harbour and upstream Avon between Cumberland Basin and Pulteney Weir.
