= Underfall Yard =

Boatyard in Bristol, England

Coordinates: 51.4468°N 2.6174°W

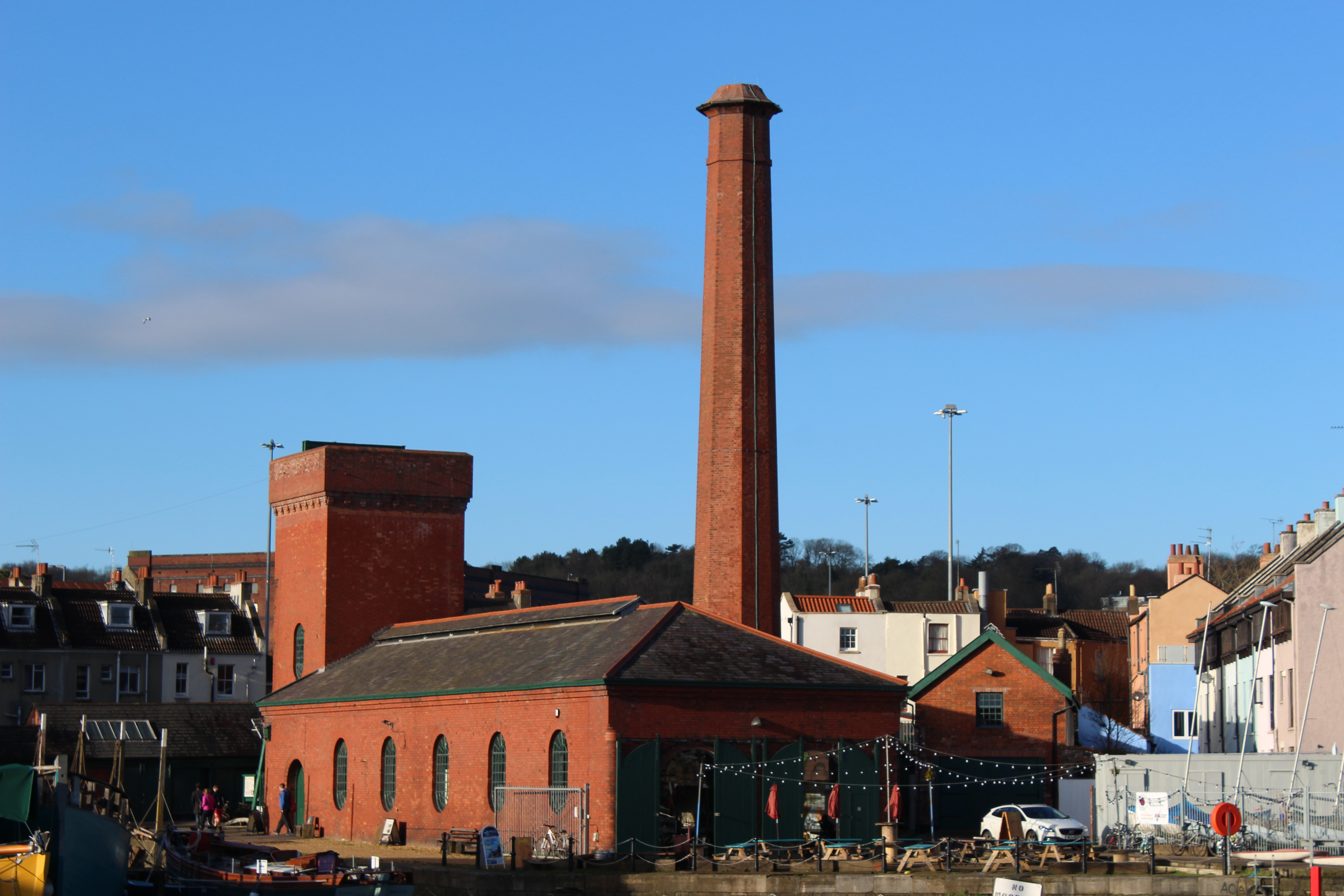
Underfall Yard's former pump room - redeveloped in the 2015 project to become the visitor centre

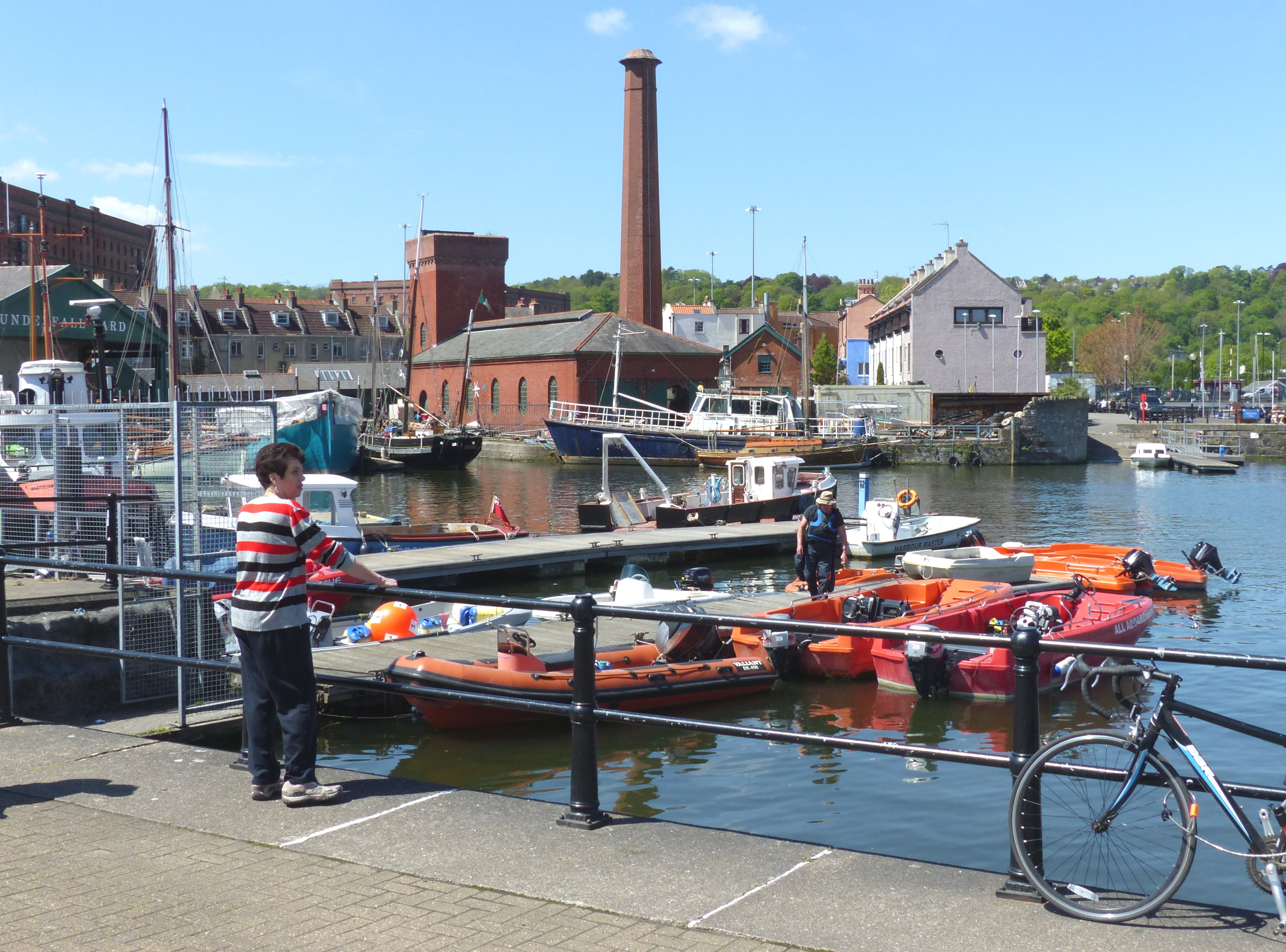
General view of Underfall Yard

The Underfall Yard is a historic boatyard on Spike Island serving Bristol Harbour in England.

Underfall Yard was commonly referred to as "The Underfalls" and takes its name from the underfall sluices. The construction was completed in 1809 under the direction of William Jessop and substantially improved by Isambard Kingdom Brunel in the 1830s.

Restored in the 1990s, Underfall Yard has been designated as a scheduled monument and from the 1970s onward many of the buildings at Underfall Yard have been given Grade II Listed Building status. The harbour and its equipment are still maintained, and house a number of maritime related companies.

== History ==
In the early nineteenth century the engineer, William Jessop was engaged by the Bristol Dock Company to create a Floating Harbour to eliminate the problem of ships being grounded at low tide. Jessop built a lock to retain the water in the harbour; this was completed in 1809, and allowed ships to remain floating at all times, unaffected by the state of the tide on the river. Part of the project included building a dam at the Underfall Yard with a weir, known as the Overfall, to allow surplus river water to flow into the New Cut, an excavation which by-passed the Floating Harbour and joined the River Avon near Temple Meads.

The docks' maintenance facility was established on the land exposed by the damming of the river to construct the harbour, and remains sited at this location to the present day. By the 1830s the Floating Harbour was suffering from severe silting and Isambard Kingdom Brunel devised the underfall sluices based on William Jessop's original plans and recommended the use of dredgers as a solution .

The Bristol Docks Company never achieved commercial success and was taken over by Bristol City Council in 1848. In 1880 the Council bought the Slipway and yard to enlarge the docks' maintenance facilities.

The 'Underfall' system was re-built in the 1880s, with longer sluices, and the yard above was enlarged. Brunel's method of silt disposal is still in operation today, but the silt is carried in mud barges or pumped to the sluices through a quayside pipe system from the more efficient modern 'Cutter-Suction' dredgers.

During the 20th century the western parts of the yard were leased to P & A Campbell Ltd, operators of the White Funnel Line of paddle steamers as a maintenance base. The yards have been little altered recently except for the replacement of the three-storey 'A' block over the sluice paddle room resulting from bomb damage in World War II.

Underfall Yard has been refurbished under the management of the Underfall Yard Trust (previously Underfall Restoration Trust).

Based at the yard are maritime academies, a scout sailing section, a blacksmith, rigging company, Omni, and three boat building businesses.

In 2015 a major restoration project was announced with the work including the development of a cafe and visitor centre. An oral history project is being conducted and school education programmes have been introduced as part of the restoration and redevelopment.

In the early morning of 6 May 2023, the yard caught fire destroying several boats and a maintenance shed after an arson attack.

== Underfall sluices ==
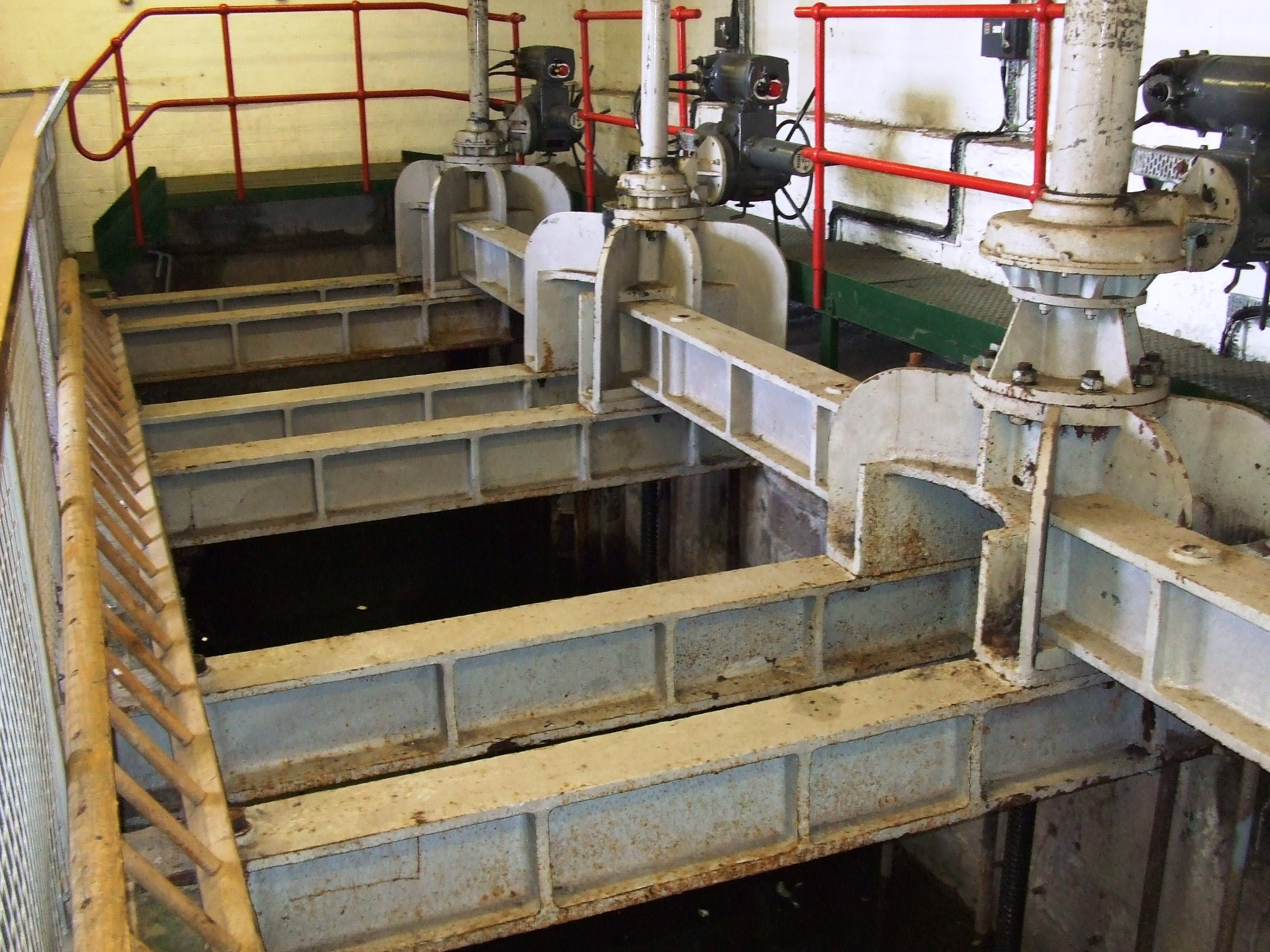
The sluices

Jessop's original designs for the harbour included a dam with an 'overfall', with the level of the water determined by the height of the dam's crest. As a result of the accumulation of mud and silt in the harbour, ships entering the narrow harbour were frequently being grounded. In 1832 Brunel was called upon to provide the solution to this problem and designed the sluice system, still in use today, to remove excesses of silt and mud.

In place of the Overfall he constructed three shallow sluices and one deep scouring sluice, between the harbour and the New Cut, together with a dredging vessel, known as a drag boat, to scrape the silt away from the quay walls. Sluices 1, 2 and 4 ('shallow') are used to control the water level, while sluice 3 ('deep') removes the silt. When the deep sluice is opened at low tide, a powerful undertow is created which sucks the silt out of the harbour and into the river. Since the original introduction of the sluices, they have been changed and renewed several times but today's sluice system was installed in the 1880s. In March 1988, the sluice control was computerised and automated.

== Buildings ==
Most of the buildings and engineering installations at the yard were constructed between 1880 and 1890 under the direction of John Ward Girdlestone. Many of them have been designated by English Heritage as listed buildings.

The octagonal brick and terracotta chimney of the engine house dates from 1888, and is grade II* listed, as is the hydraulic engine house itself. It replaced the original pumping house which is now The Pump House public house. It is built of red brick with a slate roof, and originally contained two steam-engine powered pumps. These were replaced in 1907 by the current electrically powered machines from Fullerton, Hodgart and Barclay of Paisley (the currently installed electric motors were manufactured by JH Holmes & Co, Hebburn-upon-Tyne and date from 1938-9). It powered the docks hydraulic system of cranes, bridges and locks.

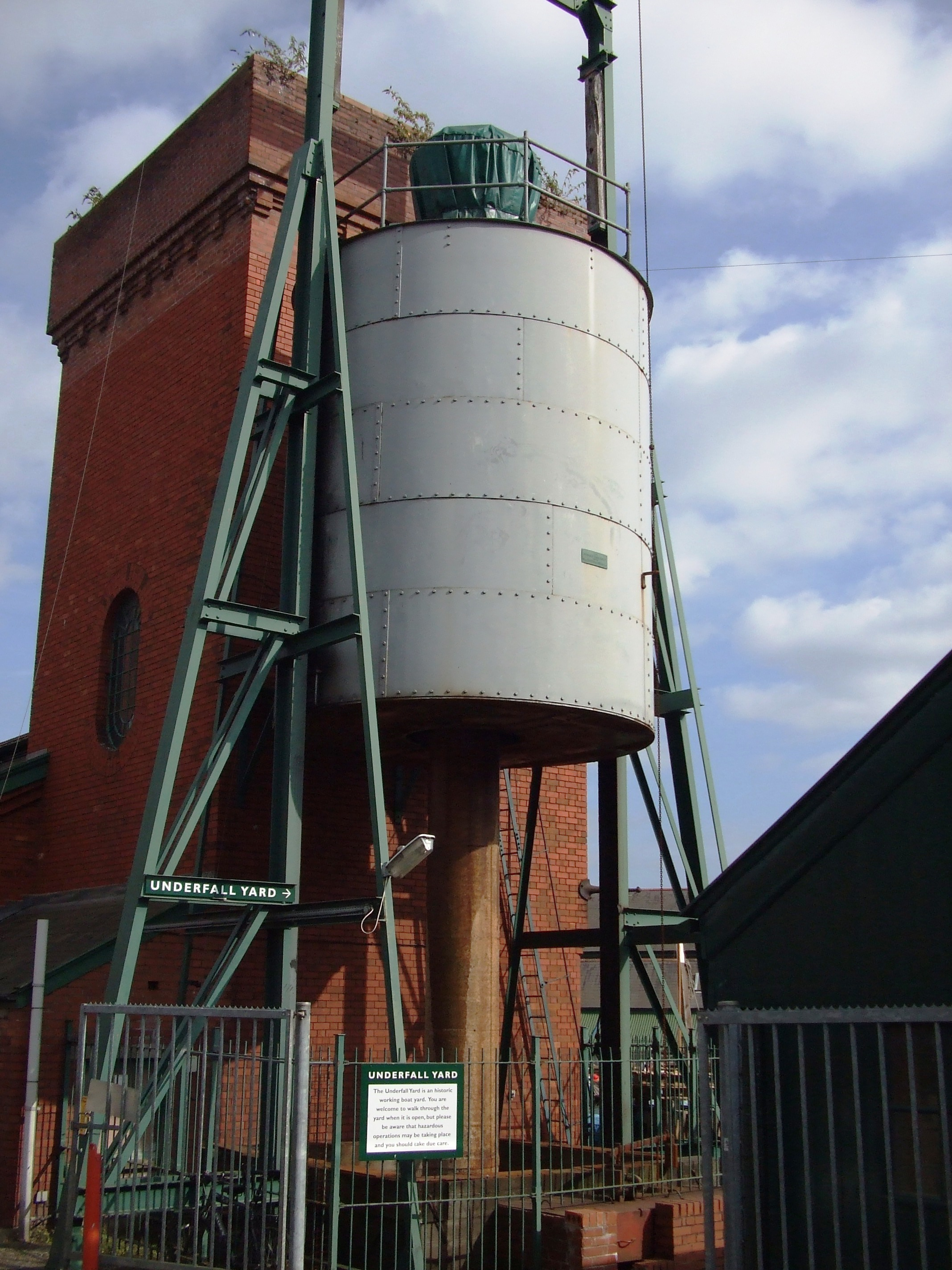
External Hydraulic accumulator

The tower houses a raised weight hydraulic accumulator which stores the hydraulic energy, ensuring a smooth delivery of pressure, and meaning that the pumps do not need to be running the whole time in order to satisfy peak demand. The external accumulator was added in 1954. The water is pumped from the harbour into a header tank and then fed by gravity to the pumps. The working pressure is 750 lbf/in² (5.2 MPa).

=== Dock maintenance workshops ===
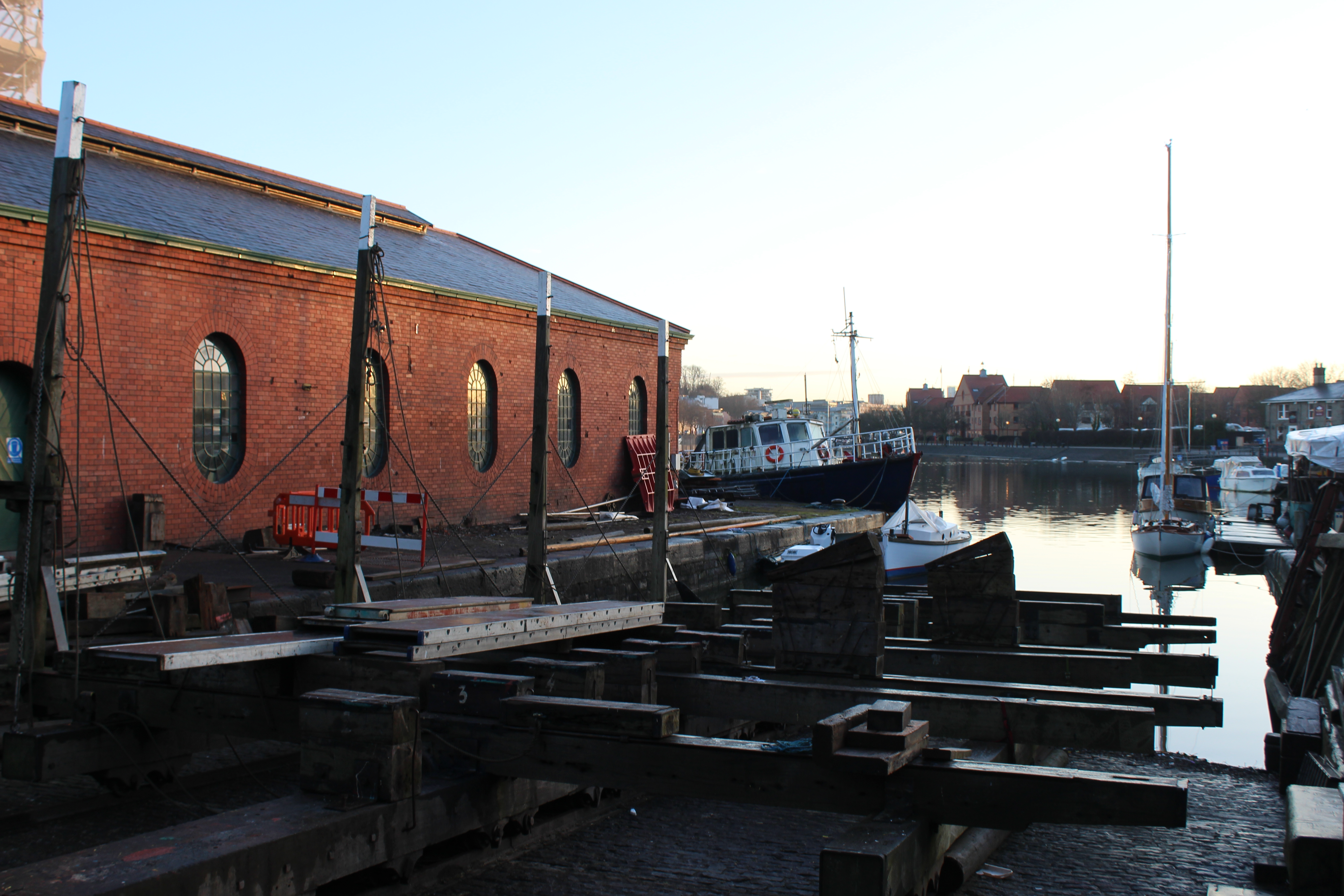
The Patent Slip, built in the 1890s

The dock maintenance workshops survive from the 1880s but were extended in the early 20th century. The brick building is topped with a tiled double-pile hipped roof with corbelled eaves. It has sliding doors at each end, giving access to the boiler and engine houses, blacksmith's and engineer's shops. Much of the original machinery survives, including steam-powered plant from the mid-1880s. These include a Whitworth planing machine, a Whitworth slotting machine, punching-and-shearing machines, a long-bed lathe and a steam hammer. There is also wall-mounted line-shafting and a Tangye horizontal engine and Cornish boiler.

=== Pattern maker's shop ===
The former pattern-maker's shop and stores date from the same period and are grade II listed,

Many of the original wooden patterns still exist with some being used for educational purposes, some being put on display, and others kept for operational purposes. The shop is occupied by RB Boatbuilding Ltd, a small business dedicated to the re-creation of classic, late 19th century, wooden working boats, including the Bristol Channel Pilot Cutter. The Slipway Co-operative Ltd manages the slipping of boats. They build, repair and restore wooden craft including the 14 feet (4 m) Bristol Jolly Boat.

=== Slipway ===
The original slipway was built by John Ward Girdlestone in 1890 to replace a predecessor built in the 1850s by boat builders Ross and Sage. It used a system in which the ship is floated onto the cradle and secured. The cradle is then drawn out of the water with a steam-driven winch. The device was a low-cost alternative to dry docks for maintenance and repair work. This became known as the Patent slipway or 'Heave-up Slip' and was patented in 1819 by shipbuilder Thomas Morton of Leith in Scotland.

The 1890 replacement was originally driven by an hydraulic engine powered by the dock's hydraulic system. In 1924, an electric motor was installed, which still operates today. The Bristol slipway is relatively small with a cradle of 100 feet (30 m) and a runway of 265 feet (81 m) and can lift vessels up to 250 tons (250 tonnes).

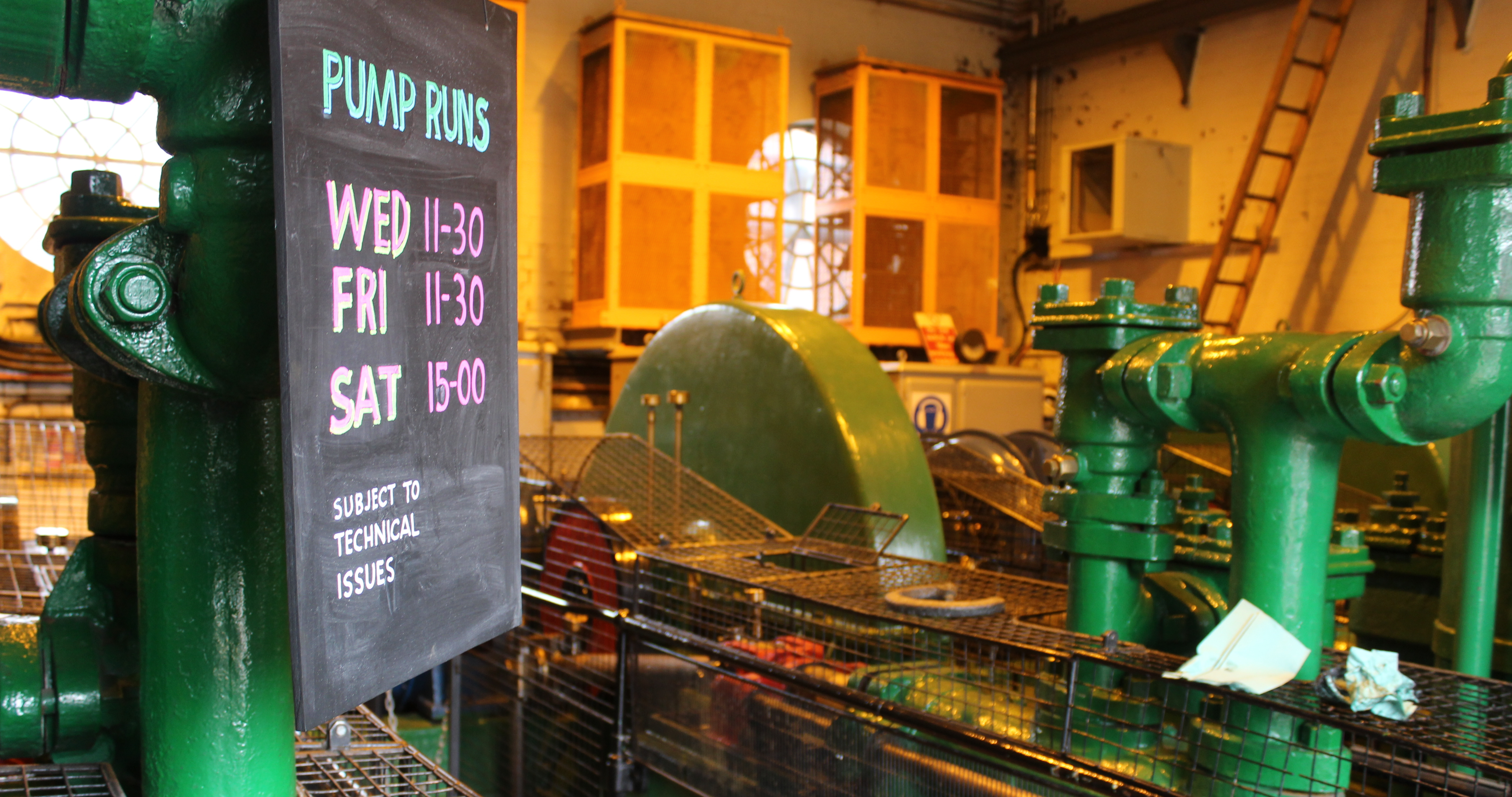
The three electric pumping engines

It fell into disuse by 1974. By the 1990s it was rotting and was rebuilt by members of the Slipway Co-operative and Underfall Trust in 1998–99. The restoration required the complete renewal of the underwater runway with steel piling to replace the previous timber, iron and masonry supports. The above-water track was re-laid, reusing the original cast iron centre rails with their integral ratchets. The cradle was completely rebuilt on the original pattern. The functioning of the slipway was essential for the long-term preservation of the restored Underfall Yard as a historic industrial monument, as it provided the Underfall Restoration Trust with funds to maintain the slipway and buildings, and the tenants of those buildings with boats to earn a living.

=== The Pump Room ===
The power house at Underfall Yard was built in 1887 to supply hydraulic power to a network around the floating harbour. It was originally powered by steam (the large chimney remains from this system). The room that is now the visitor centre housed three boilers, which powered steam hydraulic pumps. There are three electric pumps in the room adjacent to the visitor centre, which are regularly run to demonstrate how they worked. These three pumps are 1907 replacements for the originals.

=== The Big Shed ===
Originally used as a place in which large items such as lock gates were built, the Big Shed was used by maritime businesses and is not open to the public.

== See also ==
- The Underfall Yard - an album by British progressive rock band Big Big Train, inspired by the Underfall Yard itself along with other local projects completed by Victorian engineers.

== Bristol Harbour Map ==
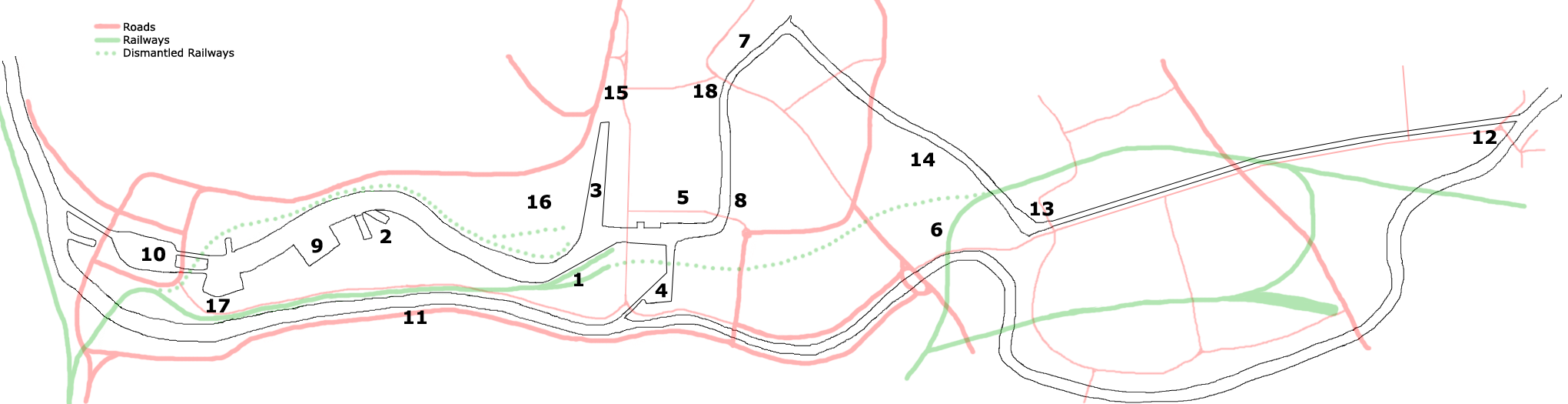

1. Prince's Wharf, including M Shed, Pyronaut and Mayflower adjoining Prince Street Bridge
2. Dry docks: SS Great Britain, the Matthew
3. St Augustine's Reach, Pero's Bridge
4. Bathurst Basin
5. Queen Square
6. Bristol Temple Meads railway station
7. Castle Park
8. Redcliffe Quay and Redcliffe Caves
9. Baltic Wharf marina
10. Cumberland Basin & Brunel Locks
11. The New Cut
12. Netham Lock, entrance to the Feeder Canal
13. Totterdown Basin
14. Temple Quay
15. The Centre
16. Canon's Marsh, including Millennium Square and We The Curious
17. Underfall Yard
18. Bristol Bridge and Welsh Back
