= Welsh Back, Bristol =

Wharf and street in the city of Bristol, England

Coordinates: 51.4518°N 2.5924°W

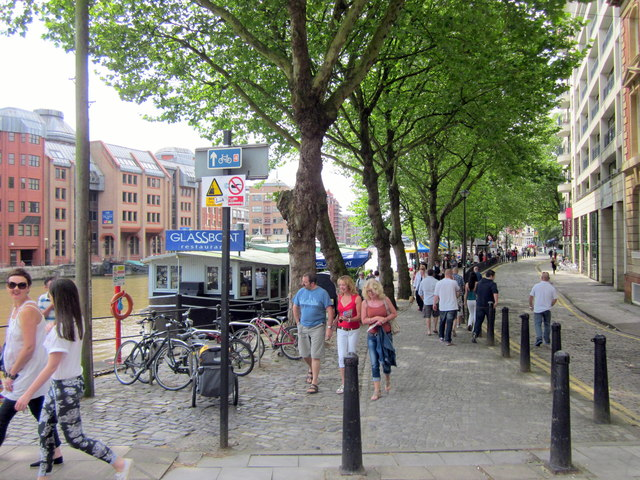
Welsh Back looking south

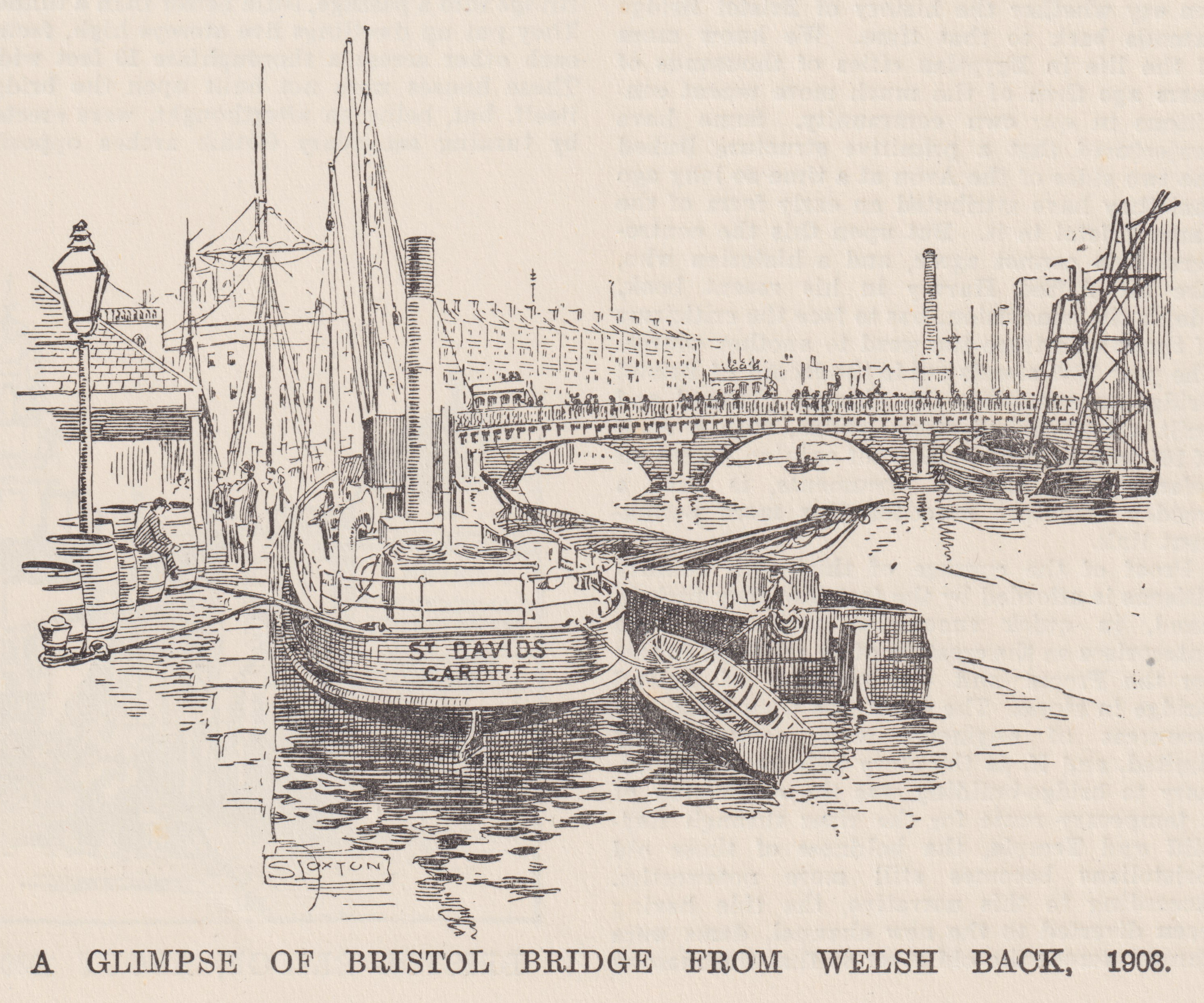
Welsh Back in 1908

Welsh Back is a wharf and street alongside the floating harbour in the centre of the city of Bristol, England. The wharf and street extend some 450 metres (1,480 ft) along the west side of the harbour between Bristol Bridge and Redcliffe Bridge. At the northern (Bristol Bridge) end, the street and wharf are immediately adjacent, but to the south they are separated by a range of single story transit sheds. The wharf is a grade II listed structure and takes its name because it was frequented by vessels from Welsh ports.

The Welsh Back has been an important quay since the 13th century, when it was located on the tidal course of the River Avon. In 1475, the merchant and benefactor Alice Chestre is recorded as having given a crane for use at the Welsh Back, this being the first evidence of a crane in the port of Bristol. The quayside was extended in 1724, and in 1809 the floating harbour was created by impounding the former river channel, meaning that boats could stay afloat at all states of the tide when alongside the quay. Today the Welsh Back is mostly the site of bars and restaurants, situated either in the buildings on the landward side of the street, or in boats moored alongside the quay.

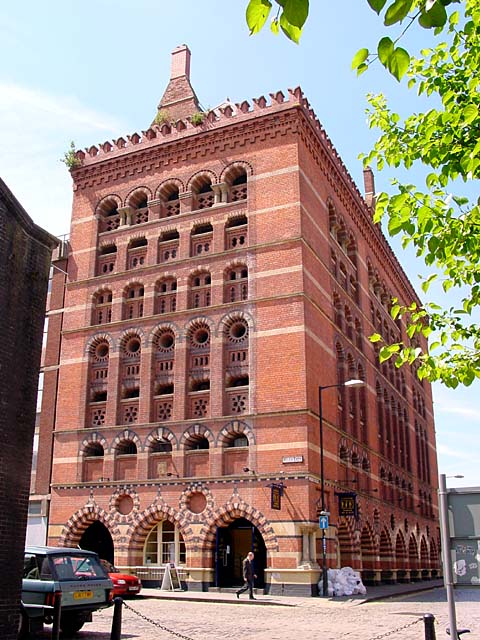
The Granary on Welsh Back

The buildings on the landward side of the Welsh Back include the Granary, an imposing building in the Bristol Byzantine style. Just inland from the intersection of King Street and the Welsh Back is the historic Llandoger Trow public house, said to have inspired Robert Louis Stevenson in writing Treasure Island. Towards the northern end of Welsh Back is the so-called ‘bomb hole’, part of the quayside that was damaged by bombing during the Second World War and retained as a memorial. Alongside this is the Merchant Seamen's memorial, commemorating those who lost their lives sailing from Bristol.

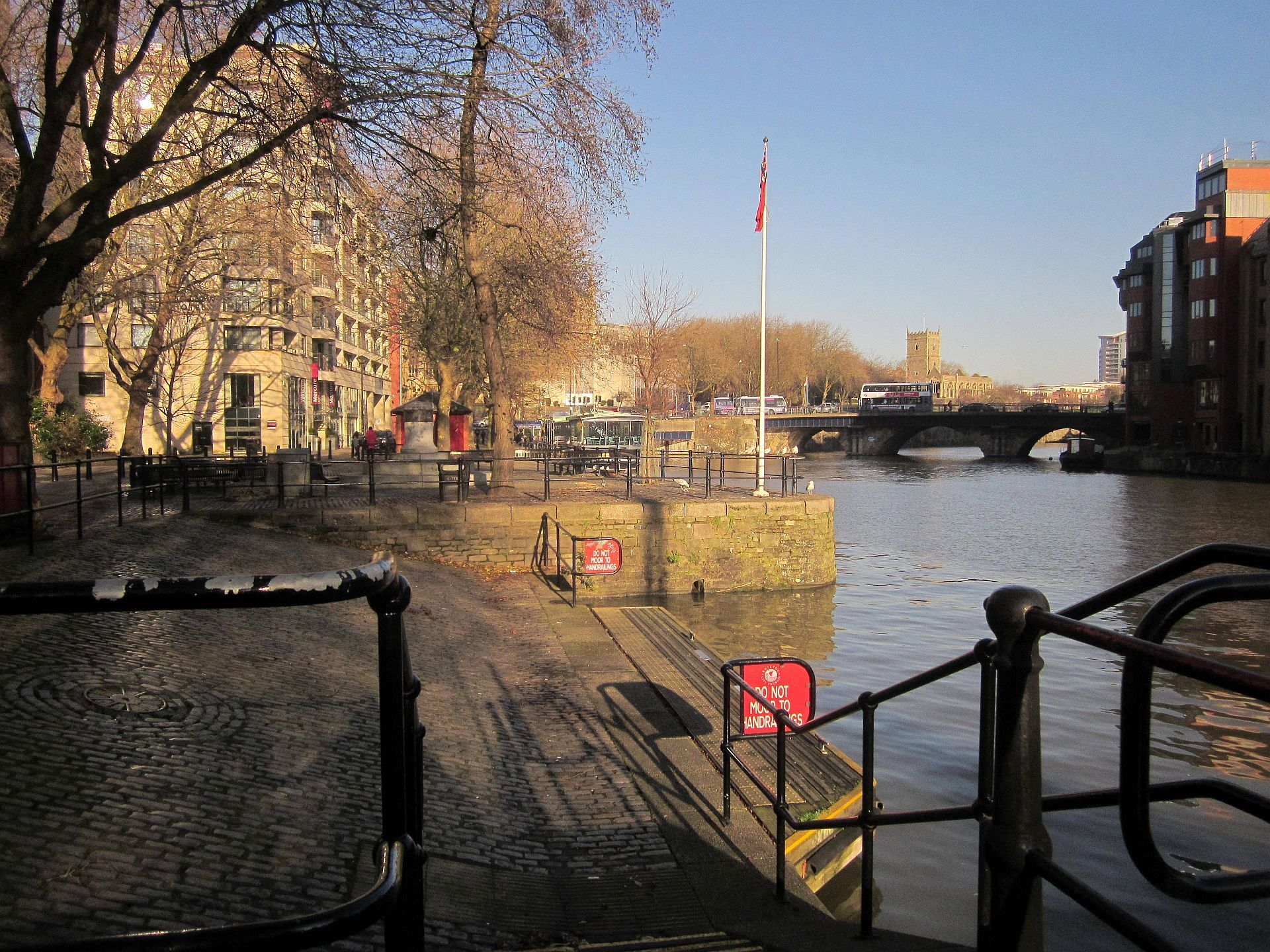
Looking north towards Bristol Bridge, with the 'bomb hole' in the foreground

== Location within Bristol harbour ==
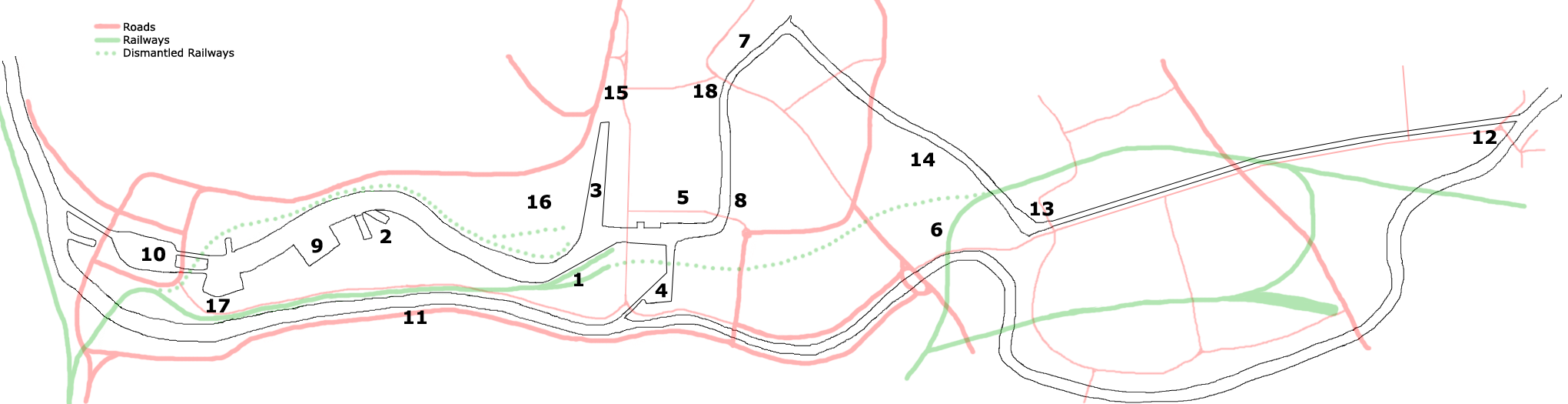

1. Prince's Wharf, including M Shed, Pyronaut and Mayflower adjoining Prince Street Bridge
2. Dry docks: SS Great Britain, the Matthew
3. St Augustine's Reach, Pero's Bridge
4. Bathurst Basin
5. Queen Square
6. Bristol Temple Meads railway station
7. Castle Park
8. Redcliffe Quay and Redcliffe Caves
9. Baltic Wharf marina
10. Cumberland Basin & Brunel Locks
11. The New Cut
12. Netham Lock, entrance to the Feeder Canal
13. Totterdown Basin
14. Temple Quay
15. The Centre
16. Canons Marsh, including Millennium Square and We The Curious
17. Underfall Yard
18. Bristol Bridge and Welsh Back
