= New Cut, Bristol =

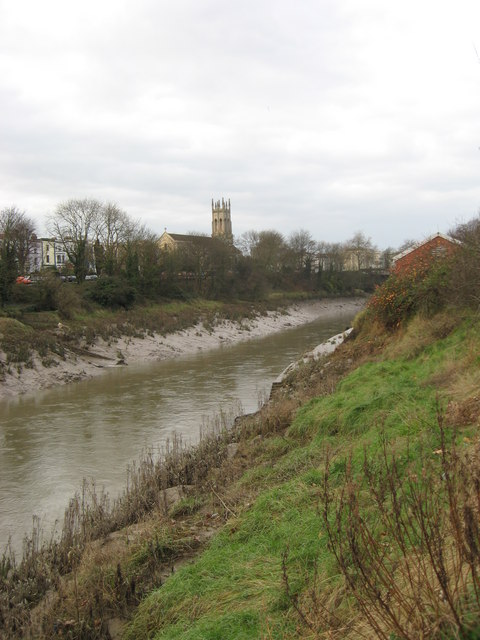
- The river Avon, in the New Cut, looking west towards Southville and St Pauls church, Bedminster

Location
- Country: England
- State: Bristol

Physical characteristics
- Source: River Avon
  - location: Netham Weir, Bristol, England
  - coordinates: 51°27′06″N 2°33′09″W
  - elevation: 27 ft (8.2 m)
- Mouth: River Avon
  - location: Rownham, Bristol, England
  - coordinates: 51°26′53″N 2°37′30″W
  - elevation: 9 ft (2.7 m)
- Length: 3.2 mi (5.1 km)

Basin features
- Tributaries
  - left: River Malago

The New Cut is an artificial waterway which was constructed between 1804 and 1809 to divert the tidal river Avon through south and east Bristol, England. This was part of the process of constructing Bristol's Floating Harbour, under the supervision of engineer William Jessop. The cut runs from Totterdown Basin at the eastern end of St Phillip's Marsh, near Temple Meads, to the Underfall sluices at Rownham in Hotwells and rejoining the original course of the tidal Avon.

The length of the cut is approximately 1.8 miles (2.9 km) and with the addition of short sections of the original course of the river Avon at either end, connecting Netham weir and Totterdown basin, and the Underfall sluices to the mouth of the Entrance lock at Cumberland Basin, the overall watercourse length is 3.2 miles (5.1 km). No ships have navigated the cut on a regular basis since the 1930s, but it is still possible for boats to proceed as far as Netham weir with care.

== Construction ==
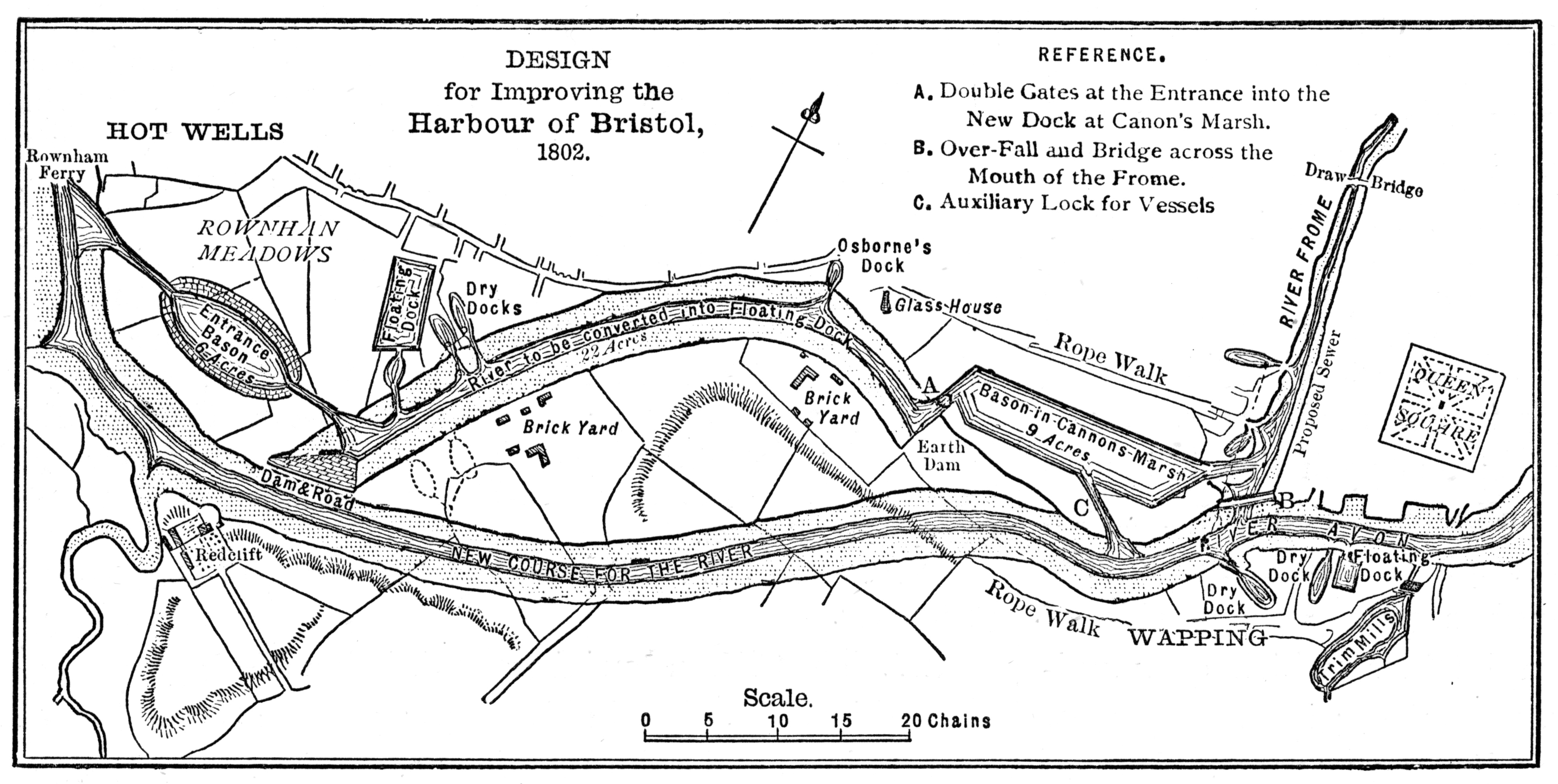
One of Jessop's 1802 plans (not adopted) for the New Cut, as a shorter addition south of the western portion of the original harbour

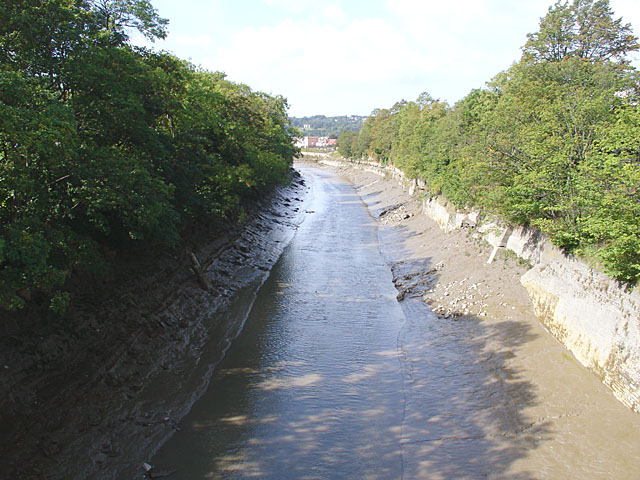
The New Cut at low tide, seen from Gaol Ferry Bridge

The Bristol Docks Company was formed to construct the Floating Harbour following the passage of an Act of Parliament in 1803, sponsored by the City Corporation and the Merchant Venturers. The engineer William Jessop had originally proposed a smaller scheme, which would have involved a shorter cut from Prince Street, near the city centre, to Rownham. However this would have meant that ship owners could have avoided using the new Floating Harbour and the scheme was amended to include a greater area of the river Avon, thus necessitating the longer cut which is in existence today.

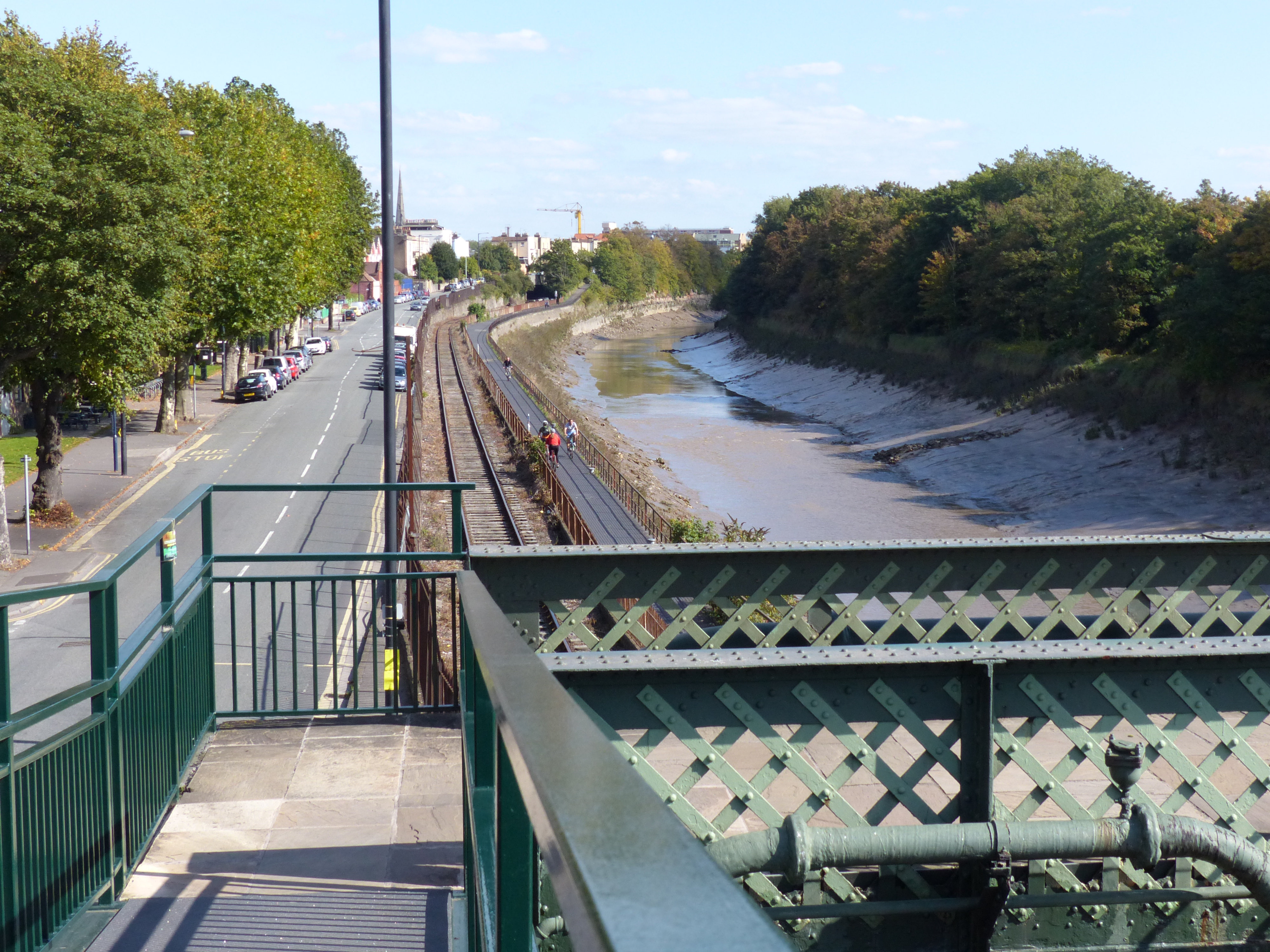
The Avon New Cut from Vauxhall Bridge

Work commenced on the construction on 1 May 1804 at 5am at a ceremony conducted by the directors of the Bristol Docks Company. Excavation was made through the predominant Redcliffe Sandstone, a Triassic rock that can be seen in cuttings all along the New Cut. There is a persistent local myth that the labour force included French prisoners of war, but there is no evidence to support this.

A report to the company stated that in the first year of excavation 780,625 cubic yards (596,831 m^{3}) of earth and rock had been removed at a cost of £120,138 12s. 1d. The initial estimates of £300,000 for the whole docks scheme proved insufficient and further acts had to be passed to raise the capital to £600,000. The Avon was diverted into the New Cut in January 1809 and on 2 April the first ships passed up the cut and entered the harbour at the Bathurst Basin.

On 1 May 1809 the docks project was certified as complete and a celebratory dinner was held on Spike Island for a thousand of the navvies, navigational engineers who had worked on the construction, at which "two oxen, roasted whole, a proportionate weight of potatoes, and six hundredweight of plum pudding" were consumed, along with a gallon of strong beer for each man. When the beer ran out a mass brawl between English and Irish labourers turned into a riot which had to be suppressed by the press gang.

== Navigation ==
As originally envisaged, the New Cut was navigable as far as the Totterdown basin, where barges could enter the Feeder Canal and proceed up river from Netham lock to Bath, Somerset. A second lock further downstream allowed ships to enter Bathurst Basin, and hence the Floating Harbour, from the New Cut.

Shipyards sprang up on the New Cut in the 19th century. Acraman's had a yard built in St Philip's Marsh near the Feeder Canal in 1839, where they built chain-propelled floating bridges for the Gosport–Portsmouth crossing which were too wide to pass through the floating harbour. The next year Acraman's opened a second more expansive yard in Bedminster, a well equipped yard which built a number of early steam ships. The first saw occasional shipbuilding until 1874, but the second passed to John Payne Ltd in 1862 and as the Vauxhall Yard launched dozens of small vessels directly into the New Cut, until they closed in 1925.

Until the 1930s, packet boats operated regular services from Bathurst Basin to Cardiff and Swansea across the Severn Estuary, so the first two bridges built across the cut below this point (the Vauxhall Bridge and Ashton Swing Bridge) were originally swing bridges to allow for the passage of seagoing steamers. The third bridge across this stretch of the cut, the Gaol Ferry Bridge, was not built until 1935, and at about the same time the two swing bridges were permanently fixed.

The two smaller locks linking the New Cut to the Floating Harbour (Bathurst and Totterdown) were in-filled and decommissioned during World War II, as the authorities were worried that bombs falling on either lock would cause all of the water in the harbour to drain out. The remains of these locks are still visible, now permanently infilled with dirt and partially covered by modern roads.

The New Cut is thus still navigable for medium-size craft due to its tidal depth and high (albeit fixed) bridge clearances, but a dead end at Netham Weir, with no surviving businesses using it for water access.

Few boats have navigated the New Cut since the swing bridges and smaller locks were closed, although there are occasionally inspection trips to check the state of the bridges, and tourist excursions from the Floating Harbour. During the summer of 2009, special trips were run to celebrate the 200th anniversary. The cut is also regularly used by canoeists. In 1992, the Bristol Development Corporation secured an Act of Parliament to construct a new weir across the New Cut downstream of the Bathurst Basin to provide a constant height of water above that point and improve the development potential of adjacent land. Although enacted, none of the powers granted were used, and the weir was never built.

== Works cited ==
- Latimer, John (1887). The Annals of Bristol in the Nineteenth Century. W.A. F. Morgan.

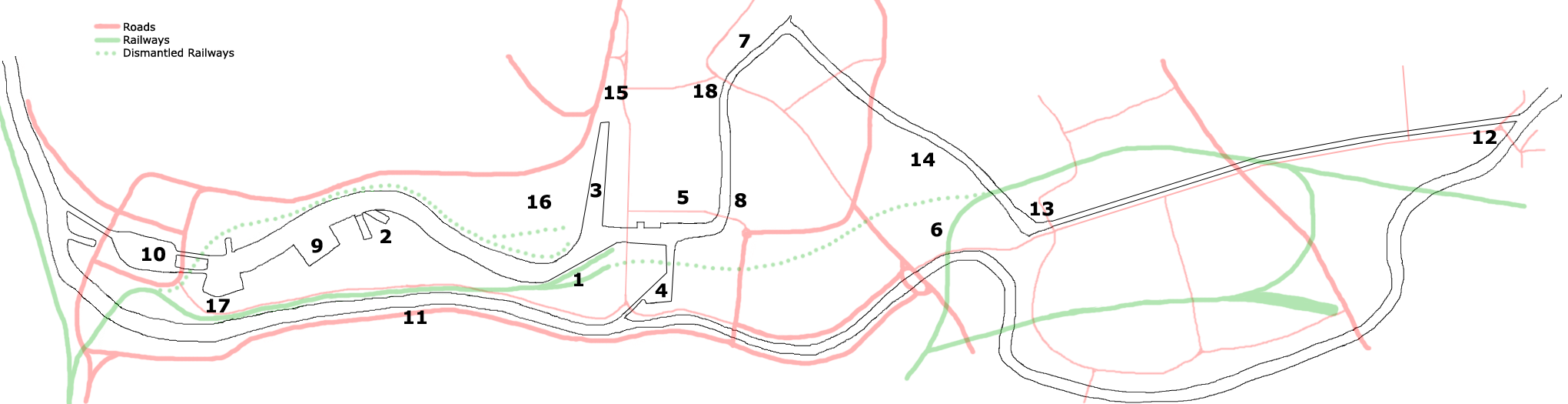

1. Prince's Wharf, including M Shed, Pyronaut and Mayflower adjoining Prince Street Bridge
2. Dry docks: SS Great Britain, the Matthew
3. St Augustine's Reach, Pero's Bridge
4. Bathurst Basin
5. Queen Square
6. Bristol Temple Meads railway station
7. Castle Park
8. Redcliffe Quay and Redcliffe Caves
9. Baltic Wharf marina
10. Cumberland Basin & Brunel Locks
11. The New Cut
12. Netham Lock, entrance to the Feeder Canal
13. Totterdown Basin
14. Temple Quay
15. The Centre
16. Canon's Marsh, including Millennium Square and We The Curious
17. Underfall Yard
18. Bristol Bridge and Welsh Back
