= Bristol Feeder Canal =

Canal in Bristol, England

Coordinates: 51°27′04″N 2°33′51″W

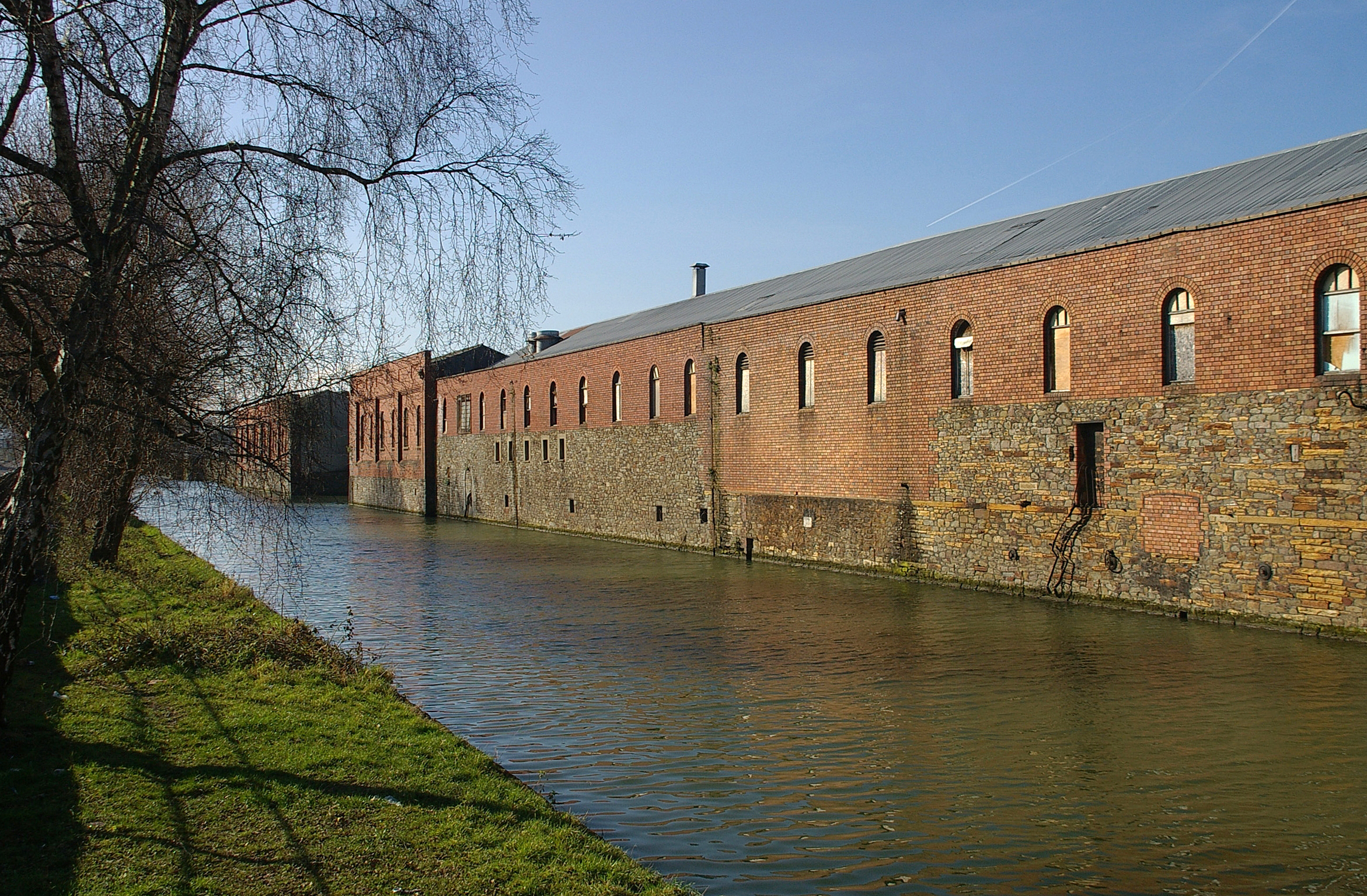
Now quiet, the canal was backed onto by industrial warehouses

The Bristol Feeder Canal is a body of water in Bristol, England, that connects the Floating Harbour with the River Avon.

It stretches from Netham Lock where it connects with the tidal Avon in the east, to Totterdown Basin where it connects to the Floating Harbour and the original course of the Avon in the west.

== Map of Bristol Harbour (with Feeder Canal between numbers 12 and 13) ==
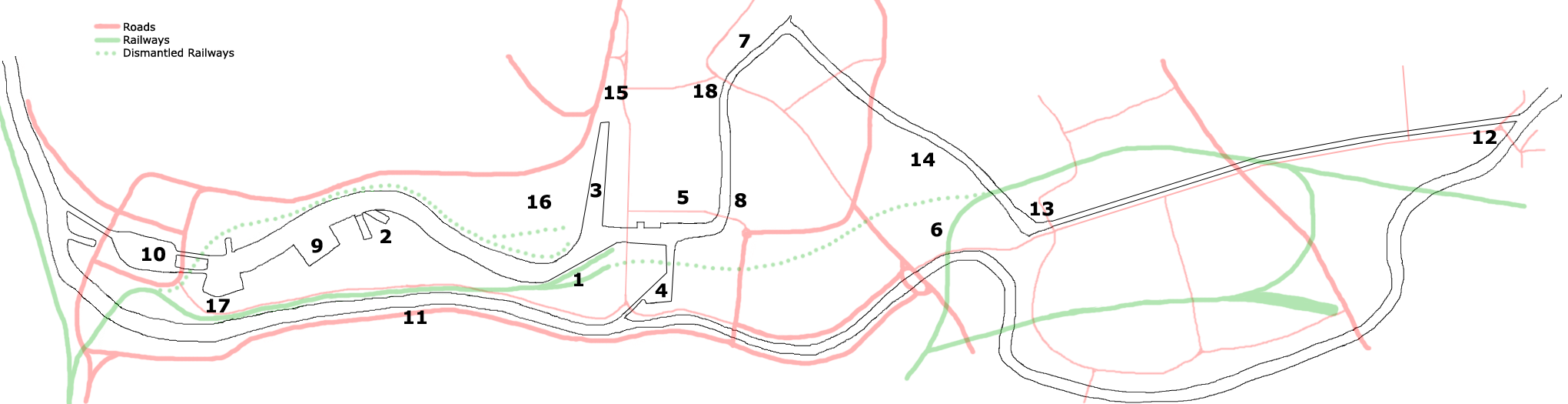

1. Prince's Wharf, including M Shed, Pyronaut and Mayflower adjoining Prince Street Bridge
2. Dry docks: SS Great Britain, the Matthew
3. St Augustine's Reach, Pero's Bridge
4. Bathurst Basin
5. Queen Square
6. Bristol Temple Meads railway station
7. Castle Park
8. Redcliffe Quay and Redcliffe Caves
9. Baltic Wharf marina
10. Cumberland Basin & Brunel Locks
11. The New Cut
12. Netham Lock, entrance to the Feeder Canal
13. Totterdown Basin
14. Temple Quay
15. The Centre
16. Canons Marsh, including Millennium Square and We The Curious
17. Underfall Yard
18. Bristol Bridge and Welsh Back
