= John Sebastian Light Vessel =

Former Lightvessel and current event venue

The John Sebastian Light Vessel 55
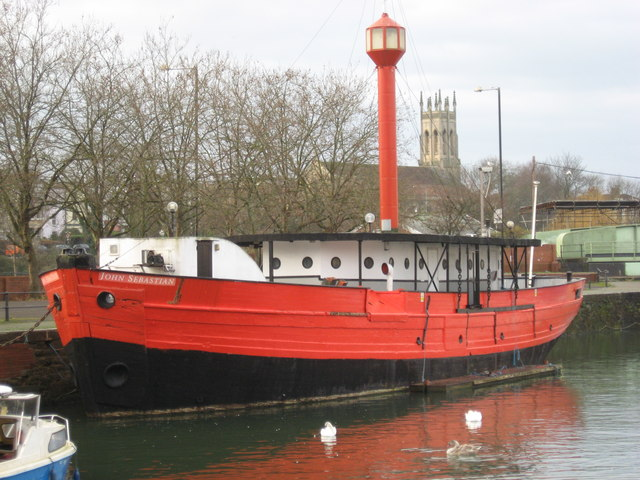
- The John Sebastian in December 2007.

The John Sebastian Light Vessel 55 is a former lightvessel that now acts as an event venue in Bathurst Basin, Bristol, England. It is the last remaining wooden lightship afloat in the world.

== History ==
The vessel was built as one of three lightvessels, LV54, LV55 and LV59, in 1885 by Charles Hill & Sons in the Albion Dry Dock in Bristol Harbour. They were of composite construction, with a wooden hull over iron frames, (Note: The museum clipper Cutty Sark has a similar construction, although is only single-hulled.) and a double wooden hull inside the frames. The lantern (Note: The current 'lantern' is a later addition and is neither original, nor bears any relation to the original design.) was fuelled by oil and could be raised up a solid wooden mast, then lowered each day to refill the lamps and trim the wicks. (Note: A similar lantern was fitted to LV 38 Gull. Although Gull became derelict on the mud at Thurrock, her mast and lantern have been preserved on shore.) As lightvessels that were intended to be permanently anchored, these were unpowered vessels with neither engines nor sails and were towed into place by a steam tug.

LV 55's service as a lightvessel was in the Bristol Channel. Members of the Cabot Cruising Club made a habit of visiting with gifts for the crew, establishing a relationship with the ship that would eventually lead to her preservation.

In 1953 the vessel was taken into Barry Docks for repair, but was instead sold out of service for scrapping to Portishead. Here she was stripped of saleable scrap metal, including the lantern. The remaining hull was burned, but she foundered instead leaving a waterlogged hull, but still afloat. The nearby Cabot Cruising Club saw the hull and its possibilities as a clubhouse. They purchased the wreck in 1954 for £275. They rebuilt the ship into an event location with a bar for their club to host socialising events. The rebuilt and enlarged deckhouse bears no resemblance to her original appearance. The ship was opened in 1959 and named 'John Sebastian' after the Bristol sailors John and Sebastian Cabot.

== Cabot Cruising Club ==
Cabot Cruising Club is a Bristol boating club founded in 1937. The club has been active for over 80 years and hosts most of their sessions at the John Sebastian. Cabot Cruising Club currently own the John Sebastian Light Vessel and host regular events at the venue.

== The Lightship Theatre ==
Cabot Cruising Club's The Lightship Theatre is an arts venue in Bristol that hosts theatre and other arts events.

They have hosted events such as The Lightship Arts Festival, along with hosting theatre companies such as Flying Chairs and Instant Wit.
