= Spike Island, Bristol =

Area of Bristol, England

Coordinates: 51.4479°N 2.6087°W

Spike Island
- Location within Bristol
- OS grid reference: ST 587 721
- Unitary authority: Bristol
- Ceremonial county: Bristol
- Region: South West
- Country: England
- Sovereign state: United Kingdom
- Post town: BRISTOL
- Postcode district: BS
- Dialling code: 0117
- Police: Avon and Somerset
- Fire: Avon
- Ambulance: South Western
- UK Parliament: Bristol Central

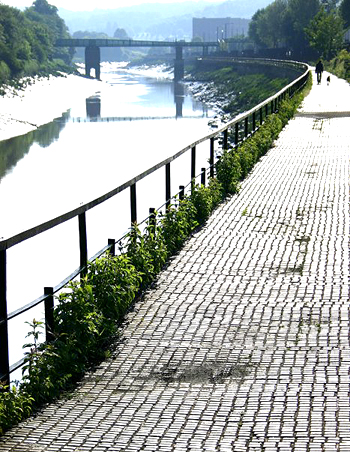
The Chocolate Block Path beside the Avon New Cut, Spike Island

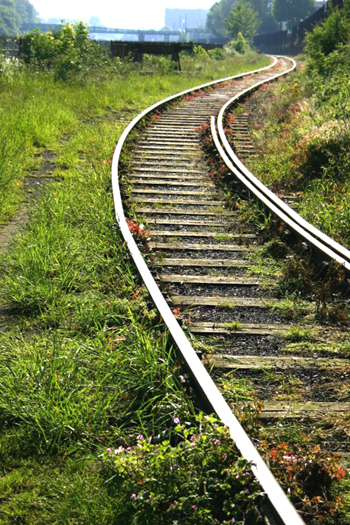
The Harbour Railway, beside the Avon New Cut, Spike Island

Spike Island is an inner city and harbour area of the English port city of Bristol, adjoining the city centre. It comprises the strip of land between the Floating Harbour to the north and the tidal New Cut of the River Avon to the south, from the dock entrance to the west to Bathurst Basin in the east. The island forms part of Cabot ward. The area between the Docks and New cut to the east of Bathurst Basin is in the neighbourhoods of Redcliffe and St Philip's Marsh.

Spike Island was created by William Jessop in the early 19th century, when he constructed the New Cut and converted the former course of the River Avon into the Floating Harbour. Until the Second World War, a lock connected Bathurst Basin with the New Cut, and Spike Island was a genuine island surrounded on all sides by water. However, fears that an aerial attack on this lock at low tide could lead to a disastrous dewatering of the docks led to the lock being filled in.

Historically, Spike Island was the site of working quays, shipyards, warehousing and other associated dockside industry. The Bristol Harbour Railway runs the length of the island, and formerly connected these working areas with the railway network. With the redevelopment of the docks, the Island has become an area popular with developers looking to create prime dock side housing such as Baltic Wharf, The Point and Perretts Court. There are also a few restaurants and popular pubs such as The Orchard Inn and The Cottage.

Other formerly dock-related buildings have become cultural venues or museums. These include:

- Spike Island Artspace, a collective of artists' studios located in a former tea-packing factory
- M Shed, the museum of Bristol, on the site of the former Bristol Industrial Museum, in a former dockside transit shed
- Bristol Archives in B Bond Warehouse, a former tobacco warehouse
- Brunel's SS Great Britain, preserved in the dry dock in which she was built
- CREATE Centre, also in B Bond Warehouse, an ecological art exhibition and Ecohome
- Underfall Yard, a base for marine-related businesses plus an interactive visitor centre and café.
- Puppet Place, a base for puppetry and animation-related businesses, and an artform support charity.

Other historic buildings have been converted into office space, housing small businesses and legal and financial companies such as Creditcall.
