= River Malago =

Malago Bishopsworth Brook, Bedminster Brook
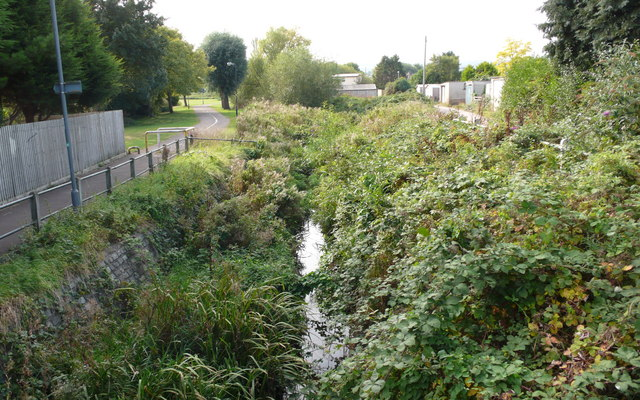
- Malago in Windmill Hill

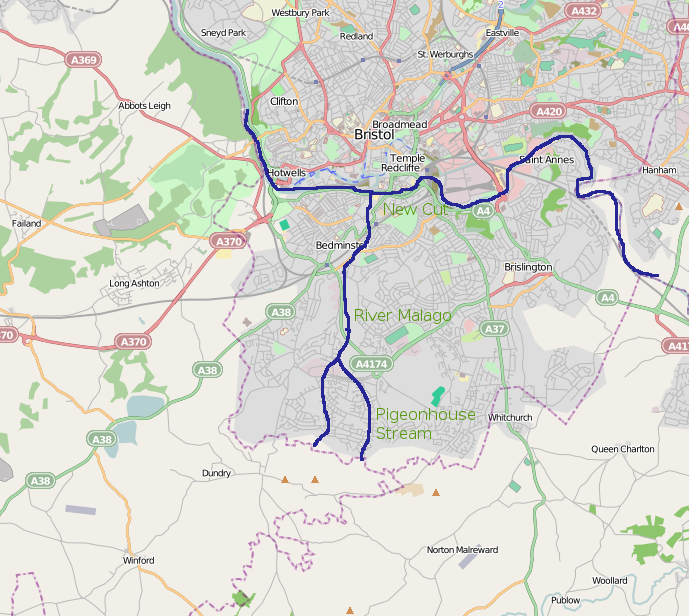
- Diagrammatic map of the Malago and Pigeonhouse
- Etymology: British Celtic melis (mill), agos (place)

Location
- Country: England
- Region: West Country
- District: Bristol

Physical characteristics
- Source
  - location: Dundry Hill, Somerset/Bristol borders, England
  - coordinates: 51.3984°N 2.6046°W
  - elevation: 508 ft (155 m)
- Mouth: New Cut
  - location: Bristol, England
  - coordinates: 51.4456°N 2.5982°W
  - elevation: 33 ft (10 m)
- Length: 5 mi (8.0 km), northerly

Basin features
- Tributaries
  - right: Pigeonhouse Stream
- River system: Bristol Avon

The Malago is a tributary of the Bristol Avon in southwestern England, some 5 miles (8.0 km) long. The river rises in springs on the north side of Dundry Hill on the borders of Somerset and Bristol. The main tributary is the Pigeonhouse stream which also rises on Dundry. Much of the river has been culverted as it flows through built-up South Bristol.

The river's course has been much altered in the past; presently it joins the New Cut of the River Avon opposite the former entrance lock to the Bathurst Basin. The river supports some wildlife in its upper reaches and pollution is relatively low.

== Course ==
Springs issuing from limestone, lying above Early Jurassic clays on the northern slopes of Dundry Hill, form the sources of the Malago and its tributary, the Pigeonhouse stream. The Malago Spring artwork near Aldwick Avenue marks one of the sources. The Pigeonhouse runs through the lower Dundry slopes and then through a small valley to the east of Hartcliffe, passing under Hengrove Way and feeding a lake on the former W.D. & H.O. Wills factory site.

From the lake the Pigeonhouse runs northwards through Crox Bottom. The Malago is culverted through much of Withywood and Bishopsworth, and is joined on the right bank by the Pigeonhouse after passing under the A4174 road. The Malago flows below Novers Hill into Bedminster where it disappears into culverts before emerging through storm drains into the New Cut opposite to the former entrance to the Bathurst Basin.

== History ==
Until the 19th century, the Malago flowed into the Bristol Avon at Treen Mills, Redcliffe. Tide mills were in operation here, possibly in Roman times when it has been suggested that they were used for Christian baptisms. They were certainly in place in the late Middle Ages. Latimer's Annals of Bristol in the Seventeenth Century records that in 1641 the Corporation, the predecessor of Bristol City Council, concluded a perambulation of the city boundaries with an open air banquet and a duck hunt at Treen Mills.

When the New Cut was constructed in the early 19th century as part of the construction of Bristol's floating harbour, the former mill pond became the Bathurst Basin, a side entrance to the harbour. As Bedminster was developed in the 19th century the lower reaches of the Malago were culverted and diverted into storm drains so that it is not possible to determine the original course of the river.

Threats in the 21st century to cover over some of the remaining open stretches in Windmill Hill to make way for a rapid transit bendy bus scheme through South Bristol were opposed by residents concerned at the loss of green space and abandoned in October 2009.

== Natural history ==
The Manor Woods Valley Local Nature Reserve on the upper reaches of the Malago Stream supports a variety of wildlife including kingfishers and heron. In common with other rivers of the Bristol Avon catchment invasive species such as Himalayan Balsam have infested parts of the Malago, but efforts are being made to remove them.

Monitoring by Bristol City Council shows that in 2010 the river had a relatively low biochemical oxygen demand, but some pollutants were present, especially in the Pigeonhouse near Hartcliffe Way.

== Etymology ==
It has been suggested that the origin of the name Malago is from the British Celtic melis (mill) and agos (place).
