= Slipway Co-operative =

Coordinates: 51.446827°N 2.617361°W

The Slipway Co-operative Ltd is a boat building and restoration company based at the Underfall Yard in Bristol, England.

The Co-operative was founded in 2002 by Win Cnoops, and the company undertakes the build of new, and repairs and restores timber yachts and motorboats. Recent work has included the refit of Uffa Fox's 45 ft The Huff of Arklow, the world's first oceangoing yacht designed with a fin and skeg, and the 35 ft Vigilant built in 1930. They also manufactured the stern windows for the restoration of the SS Great Britain.

The company also builds two classic boat designs, the 14 ft Bristol Jollyboat and the 32 ft Cornish Pilot Gig.

== Vessels built by the Slipway Co-operative Ltd ==
Recent vessels built by the company:

- Young Bristol (2007). 32 ft Cornish Pilot Gig.
