= Pump House, Bristol =

Pub in Bristol, England

The Pump House
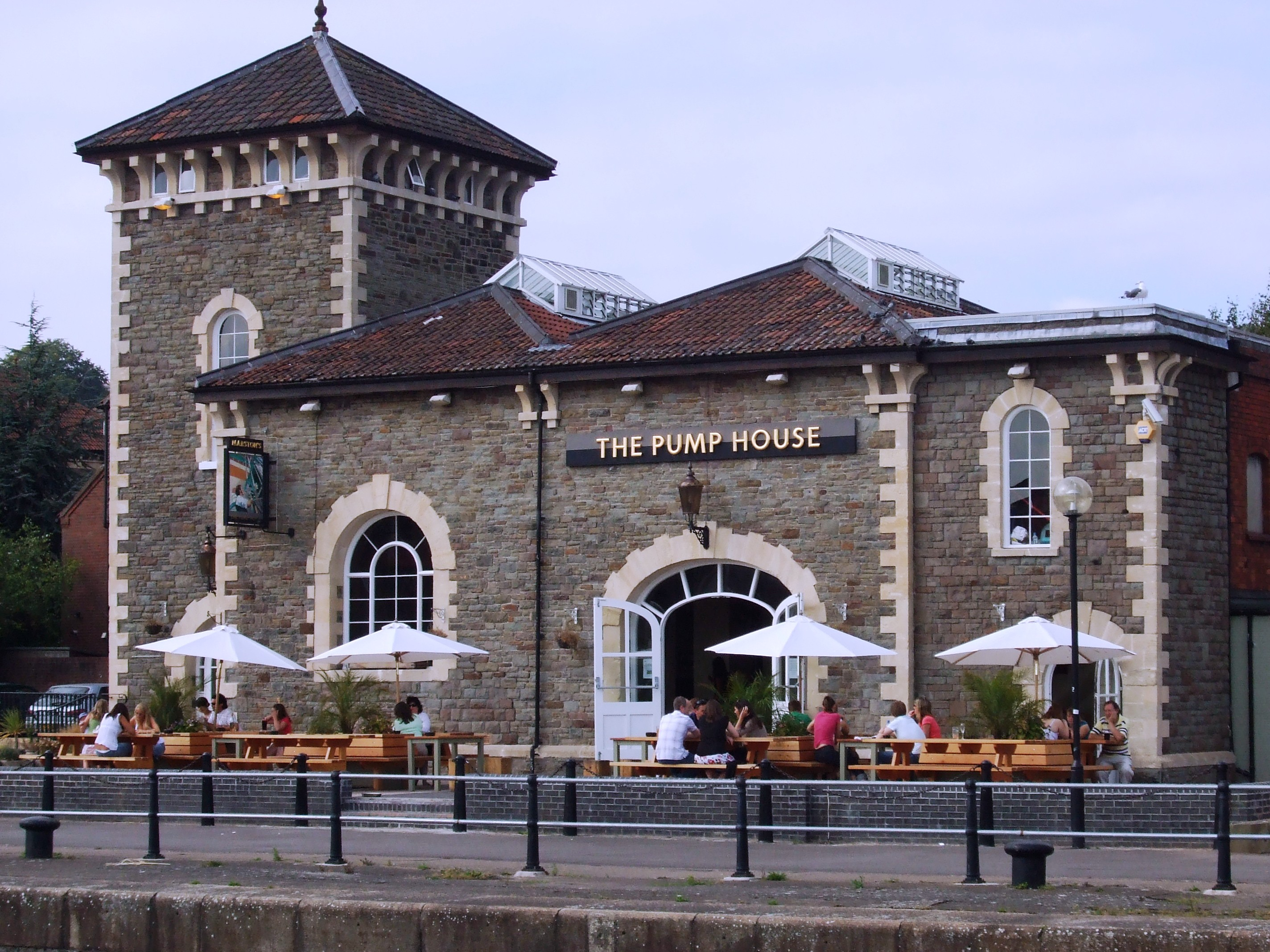
- The Pump House pub on Cumberland Basin, Bristol Harbour

- Location within Bristol

General information
- Location: Bristol, England
- Coordinates: 51.448344°N 2.617741°W
- Completed: c1870

The Pump House is an historic pub in Hotwells on Bristol Harbour, Bristol, England. It is a grade II listed building.

== Building ==
Originally known as the Cumberland Basin Hydraulic Engine House, the Pump House was constructed around 1870 by Thomas Howard to house a hydraulic pump that powered bridges and lock gates around the harbour. It was replaced by the current Hydraulic engine house at Underfall Yard in 1888. and is now a public house and restaurant.

It is built of Pennant rubble bricks, with limestone dressings and a roof made from pantiles. The main building is one storey high, 4 windows across. In addition, there is a two-story accumulator tower to the left hand side of the building. The dressings include pronounced quoins, jambs and voussoirs. The entrance is a wide elliptical-arch, which would have been large enough for carriages, and there is a large semicircular-arched window to the left of the entrance. The right-hand section of the building is set back slightly and has a small semicircular-arched doorway with a narrow window above. The accumulator tower has its own semicircular-arched doorway, and narrow window above. At the top of the tower, there is a wrought-iron weather vane, and on the left side there is a large arrowslit. The building was designated a grade II listed building on 18 February 1972.

== Restaurant ==
The building was converted into a pub, and was taken over by chef, Toby Gritten, on 11 July 2007. Around this time, the building had an extensive refurbishment, including an internal mezzanine, where the restaurant is located, a bar on the ground floor and a terrace outside. Gritten won the Best Chef award at the Bristol Good Food Awards in 2013.

The pub was taken over by Bristol Beer Factory in September 2025 and has had an extensive refurb which leans heavily into the history of the building.
