= Netham Lock =

Canal lock in Bristol, England

Coordinates: 51.4520°N 2.5542°W

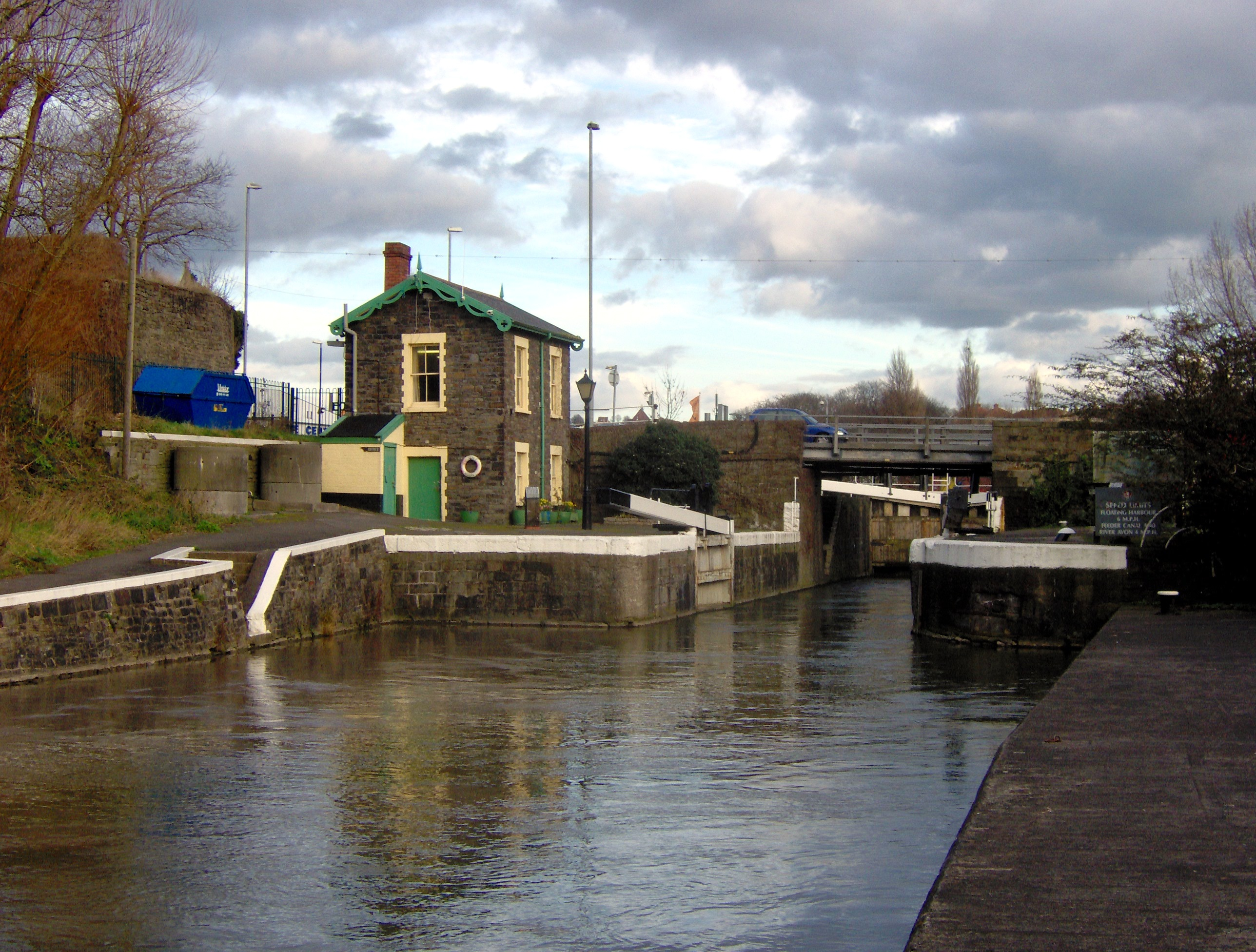
Netham Lock & lock-keeper's cottage

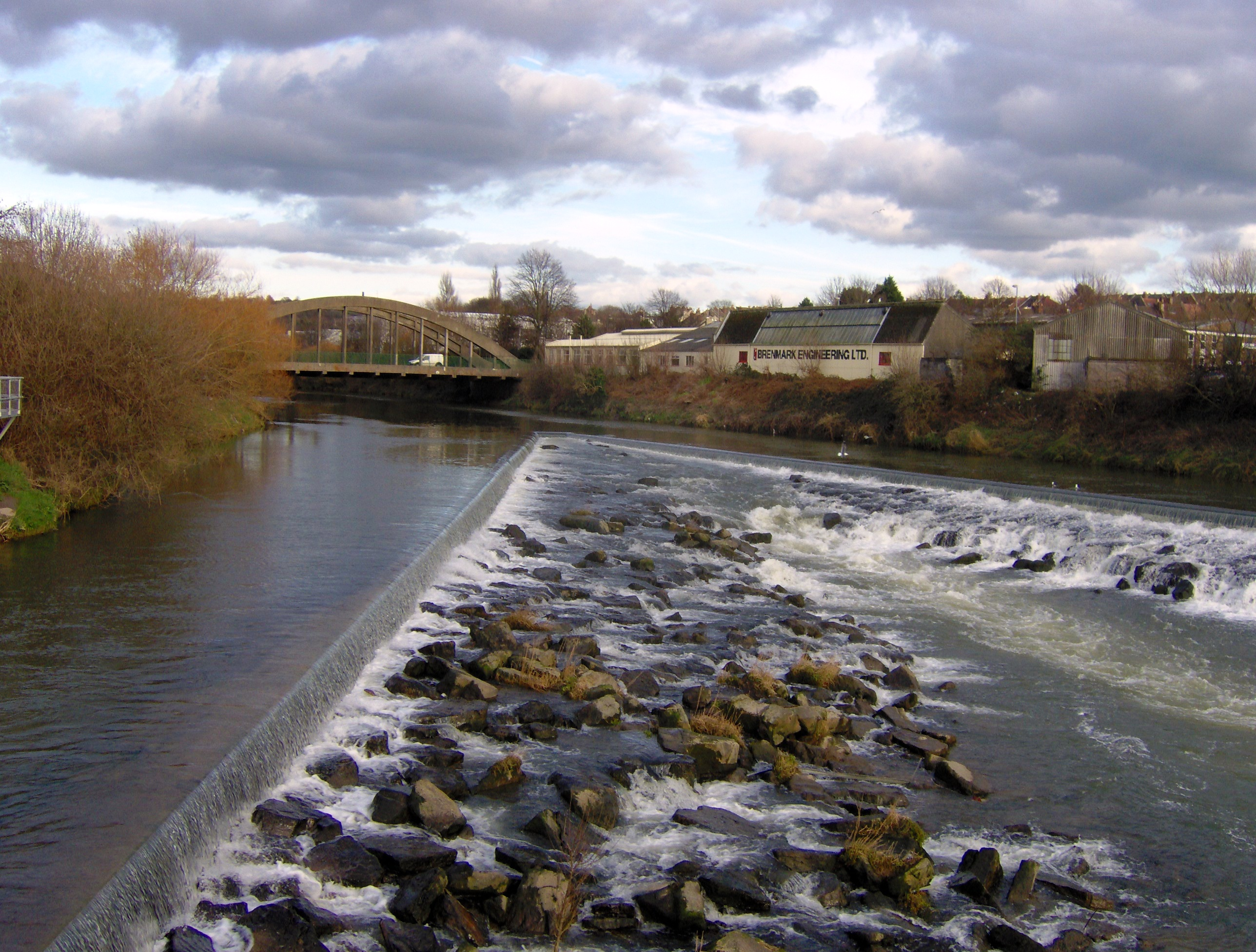
Netham Weir

Netham Lock (grid reference ST616727) is the point at Netham in Bristol at which boats from the River Avon, acting as part of the Kennet and Avon Canal, gain access to Bristol's Floating Harbour.

Construction started in 1804 to build the tidal New Cut and divert the River Avon along the Feeder Canal to the harbour; a system designed and built by William Jessop and later improved by Isambard Kingdom Brunel.

A weir carries the river into the New Cut and boats use the adjacent lock. High tides often pass over the weir, and the river is effectively tidal to the next lock upstream at Hanham. Some spring tides can also pass over the weir at Hanham, making the river tidal as far as Keynsham Lock.

Access to the harbour is only possible during the day when the lock keeper will open the gates unless the water level in the river between Netham and Hanham is above or below the level of the harbour.

The maximum dimensions of a vessel which can pass through Netham Lock are:

- Length: 24.4 metres (80 ft)
- Beam: 5.4 metres (18 ft)
- Draught: 1.9 metres (6.2 ft)
- Headroom: 3.1 metres (10 ft)

The lock-keeper's cottage, built in the early nineteenth century, is a grade II listed building and has a plaque listing it as Bristol Docks building number 1. The floral displays around the cottage and on the banking have attracted praise.

Netham Lock and the weir form part of Bristol's flood defence mechanisms and it was announced in December 2008 that they would be upgraded as part of the £11 million City Docks Capital Project.

== See also ==
Next lock upstream	River Avon, Bristol / Kennet and Avon Canal	Next lock downstream
Hanham Lock	Netham Lock; Grid reference: ST614727	Bristol Harbour entrance lock
