= Prince Street Bridge =

Bridge in Bristol, England

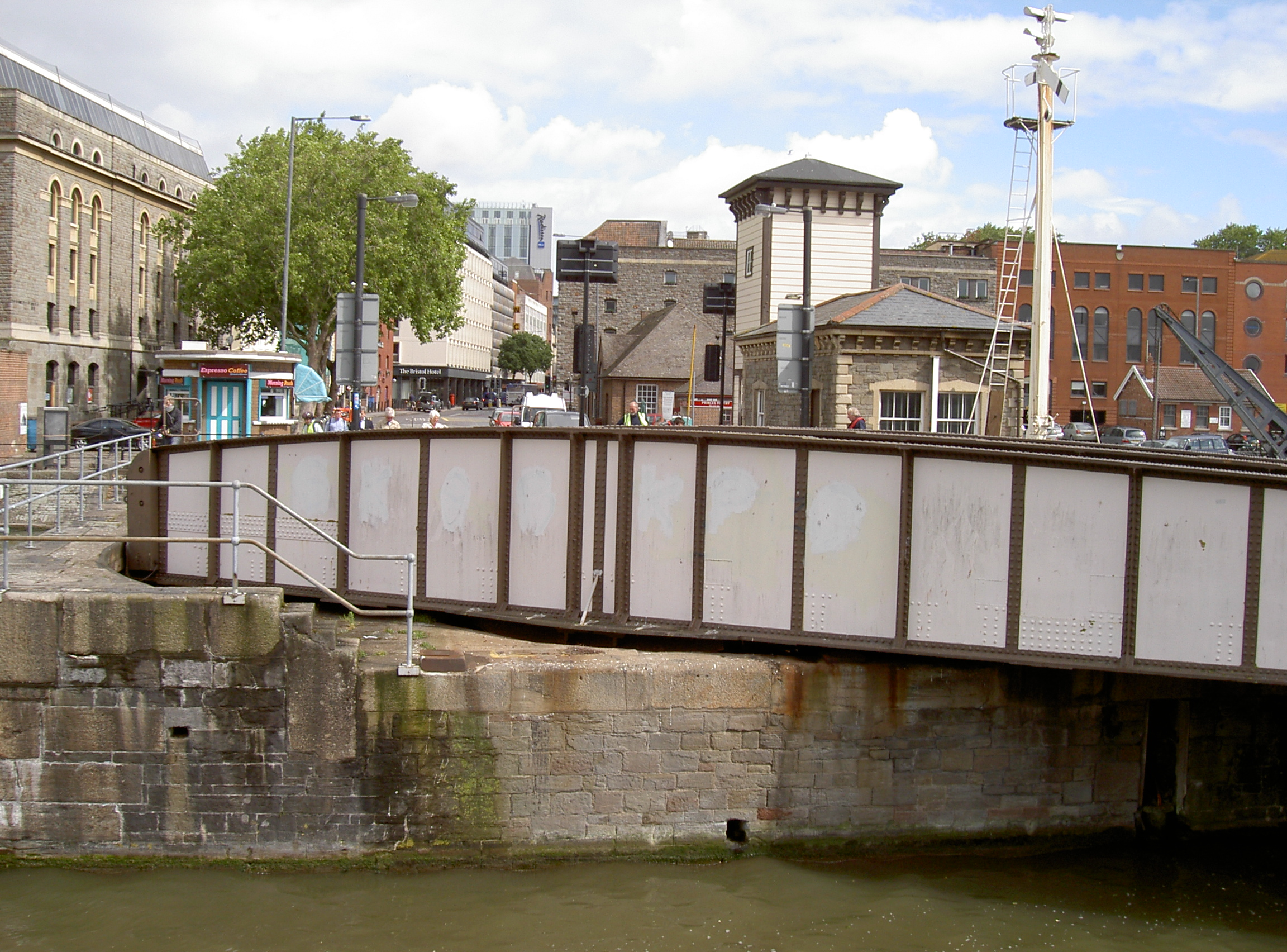
- The bridge swinging with the pumping house and accumulator tower in the background
- Coordinates: 51.4487°N 2.5968°W
- Carries: Road
- Crosses: Bristol Harbour
- Owner: Bristol City Council
- Heritage status: Grade II listed building

Characteristics
- Material: Iron
- Trough construction: Riveted steel plates

History
- Construction end: 1879
- Closed: 2015

Location
- Interactive map of Prince Street Bridge

Prince Street Bridge is a swing bridge across Bristol Harbour. It is now Grade II listed. The bridge carries a road from Prince Street to Wapping Road and is located between the Arnolfini art centre and M Shed museum.

The iron swing bridge was built in 1879 on the site of the ancient Gib ferry owned by the Dean and Chapter of Bristol Cathedral. It replaced a previous bridge built in 1809. In the 19th century tolls were charged for traffic over the bridge, with the toll house being burnt during the Bristol Riots of 1831.

The swing bridge is operated by water hydraulic power provided by the adjacent engine house and accumulator tower.

Repair work led to the closure of the bridge between 2015 and 2017. Fewer than 2,000 motor vehicle movements now cross the bridge per day using one side, whilst over 24,000 pedestrians and cyclists use the other. This has led pressure groups to call for the bridge to be closed to cars permanently.
