= Bristol Bridges Walk =

Hiking route in Bristol, UK

- Length: 30 miles (48 km)
- Location: England: Bristol
- Designation: local trail
- Trailheads: Castle Park, Bristol
- Use: Hiking
- Elevation change: 2,599 feet (792 m)
- Highest point: Clifton Observatory, 106 m (348 ft)
- Lowest point: sea level
- Difficulty: moderate
- Season: all year
- Sights: Avon Gorge, Clifton Suspension Bridge, Bristol Bridge, Avonmouth Bridge, Bristol Harbour, Castle Park, Bristol, New Cut, SS Great Britain, Durdham Down, Leigh Woods
- Hazards: Steep woodland paths

The Bristol Bridges Walk is a circular hiking route that is linked to the Königsberg bridge problem, a mathematical puzzle which laid the foundation for graph theory, the mathematical study of networks. The walk presents a solution of the puzzle for the city of Bristol. Its route leads the walker through different quarters of the city, the Avon Gorge and Leigh Woods. Along the way it crosses 45 bridges including Clifton Suspension Bridge, Bristol Bridge, and Avonmouth Bridge. The walk featured in various charity fundraisers of which the Bristol Giving Day 2019 is perhaps the most notable.

== Historical puzzle ==
The Königsberg bridge problem is a mathematical challenge from the 18th century. It asks to find a route that leads the walker across each of the seven historical bridges in the city of Königsberg such that each bridge is crossed exactly once. The seven bridges in the historical puzzle connect the two banks of the river Pregel and two river islands, but their particular configuration makes it impossible to cross all bridges without crossing at least one of them more than once, making the puzzle unsolvable. It has been suggested that the bridge problem was never a serious problem but rather a prank that the intellectual elite of the 18th century Europe played on each other.

In 1735 the challenge reached Leonhard Euler at the Academy of Sciences in St. Petersburg. Euler realised that it is easy to show that no solution exists using a brute force approach. However he wanted to find a more elegant proof, which led to a new approach that Euler called Geometry of Position. Euler's solution was so elegant that it inspired many subsequent works. These works eventually evolved into several major branches of mathematics including topology and graph theory.

== Original bridge walk, reception, and variants ==
In 2013 network scientist Thilo Gross realised that the city of Bristol has a similar configuration as Königsberg, with the city occupying two river banks and two river islands. In Bristol one of these is Spike Island, whereas the other consists of Redcliffe and St Philip's Marsh, which were historically separate, but are now joined by a land bridge. Gross then began to explore if the bridge problem is solvable in Bristol. This posed an interesting mathematical modelling challenge as criteria needed to be developed, what structures qualify as bridges in the sense of the challenge. After a first failed walk attempt during which he discovered an additional bridge, he eventually arrived at a list of 42 bridges within the city boundaries that would likely have been included in the original Königsberg problem.

On 23 February 2013, Gross completed the challenge by going on a walk that crossed each of the 42 bridges exactly once. The original route of the walk started on Spike Island and ended with the crossing of Clifton Suspension Bridge into Clifton as a circular walk wasn't possible at this time. Since the original walk, three new bridges have been constructed (Brock's Bridge, St Philip's Footbride, Bathhurst Basin Bridge West), leading to the present number of 45 bridges. As a result, a circular walk has become possible and the length of the walk has shortened slightly to approximately 30 miles (48 km). An alternative route that is suitable for mobility scooters has also been published by Jeff Lucas.

The walk received coverage in local newspapers, magazines and was further popularized in a book and also featured in a number of charity fundraisers and events, including Let's Walk Bristol, Bristol Walk Fest and Bristol Giving Day as well as smaller events.

== Route ==
The walk starts in Bristol's Castle Park by crossing Bristol Bridge, the oldest of the bridges. It briefly returns to Castle Park one more time by crossing St. Philips Bridge and Castle Ditch Bridge and then moves back and forth across between the quarters of Redcliffe and Old Market via Temple Bridge and two modern bridges named Valentine and Meads Reach Bridge. The architecture along this stretch is dominated by storehouses from Bristol's merchant past, but becomes increasingly modern closer to Bristol's commercial district. A highlight is Isambard Kingdom Brunel's Temple Meads railway station through which the route passes.

The next bridge on the route is Bath Bridge, a double bridge consisting of two separate structures that are both crossed. The route then continues along a modern hiking and cycling route underneath the platforms of Temple Meads station and via two of the newest bridges, Brock's Bridge and St Philips Footbridge. It then continues on a footpath along a stretch of Bristol's New Cut to the blue Temple Meads Relief Line Bridge. The route passes the TV studios in the Paintworks area before crossing the New Cut again via a rope suspension bridge. The route then continues through Sparke Evans Park to St Philip's Causeway Bridge. The route crosses through St Philip's Marsh to the Feeder Canal, where the it uses Barton Hill Bridge to cross into Netham Park. At Netham Lock it rejoins the River Avon and crosses New Brislington Bridge into the suburb of St Anne's. The path continues along disused docks that are remnants from the Industrial Revolution to St Anne's Footbridge, the easternmost point of the walk.

From St Anne's the route makes its way back to the city center via Feeder Road Bridge, Marsh Bridge and Totterdown Bridge. After a brief visit to Victoria Park it uses Langton Street Bridge, better known as Banana Bridge due to its shape and bright yellow color. The path crosses the New Cut two more times on Bedminster Bridge, another double bridge, before crossing over to Spike Island on a bridge known as 'the blue caboose' or Ostrich Bridge, after the nearby Ostrich pub which contains an entrance into the Redcliffe Caves. The route now reaches Bristol's Harbourside area, where it crosses the two sides of Bathhurst Basin Bridge close to the historic Bristol General Hospital building. The route uses the Gaol Ferry Bridge and then the steam-age industrial Vauxhall Bridge and finally Ashton Avenue Bridge. The path then leads across the New Cut and the Floating Harbor via a complex circuit that involves two major bridges, Avon Bridge and Plimsoll Bridge as well as several minor bridges beneath them. One of these minor bridges is known as Brunel's other bridge as it was designed by Isambard Kingdom Brunel.

The route continues up the Hill to Cliffton Village. Here it crosses the Clifton Suspension Bridge, 331 feet (101 m) above the Avon. On the other side the path descends through Leigh Woods into the Avon Gorge. The route follows an old towpath to the village of Pill where the largest and westernmost bridge of the walk is located. Avonmouth Bridge carries the M5 motorway 538 feet (164 m) across the Avon. It has a foot and bike path separate from the road.

The path returns to central Bristol via a path that leads along the beaches and woods on the bank of the Avon and past the Horseshoe Bend in the River Avon. It continues to the town of Sea Mills where it crosses the Portway Trym Bridge. From there it continues to the open fields of Durdham Down. The route uses Cumberland Basin Bridge to return to Spike Island where it passes Brunel's SS Great Britain and Banksy's Girl with the pierced eardrum before leaving via Prince Street Bridge. The route then goes past the harborside entertainment venues over Pero's Bridge and on to Victoria Square. It crosses over to Redcliffe a final time using Redcliffe Bridge before crossing at the modern Castle Bridge returning to the starting point in Castle Park.

=== List of bridges on route ===
Order	Name	Image	Distance from previous bridge	Type	Use	Location	Crosses	Coordinates	Notes
1	Bristol Bridge		0 m (0 ft)	Arch	Vehicles	Castle Park	Bristol Harbour	51°27′13″N 2°35′29″W	Listed as Grade II
2	St Philip's Bridge		400 m (1,300 ft)	Fixed	Vehicles	St Philip's	Bristol Harbour	51°27′14″N 2°35′13″W	
3	Castle Ditch Bridge		200 m (660 ft)	Cable-stayed	Pedestrians	Castle Park	Bristol Castle moat	51°27′18″N 2°35′16″W	Also known as Water Gate Bridge
4	Temple Bridge		400 m (1,300 ft)	Fixed	Vehicles	Temple Quarter	Bristol Harbour	51°27′10″N 2°35′03″W	Also known as Temple Way Bridge
5	Valentine Bridge		300 m (980 ft)	Cable-stayed	Pedestrians	Temple Quay	Bristol Harbour	51°27′06″N 2°34′54″W	Also known as Valentine's Bridge
6	Meads Reach Bridge		200 m (660 ft)	Fixed	Pedestrians	Temple Quay	Bristol Harbour	51°27′04″N 2°34′48″W	Unofficially known as Cheese grater Bridge
7	Bath Bridge (west)		700 m (2,300 ft)	Fixed roundabout	Vehicles	Redcliffe	New Cut	51°26′50″N 2°34′57″W	
8	Bath Bridge (east)		200 m (660 ft)	Fixed roundabout	Vehicles	Redcliffe	New Cut	51°26′51″N 2°34′55″W	
9	Brock's Bridge		400 m (1,300 ft)	Tied-arch	Vehicles	St Philip's Marsh	New Cut	51°26′52″N 2°34′42″W	Not currently accessible
10	St Philip's Footbridge		200 m (660 ft)	Multi-way	Pedestrians	St Philip's Marsh	New Cut	51°26′50″N 2°34′41″W	Not currently accessible
11	Albert Road Viaduct		200 m (660 ft)	Lattice truss / Through truss	Railway	St Philip's Marsh	New Cut	51°26′44″N 2°34′39″W	Known officially as the Temple Meads Relief Line Bridge
11	Sparke Evans Park Bridge		1,500 m (4,900 ft)	Suspension / Lattice truss	Pedestrians	Sparke Evans Park	New Cut	51°26′41″N 2°33′47″W	
13	St Philips Causeway Bridge (east)		300 m (980 ft)	Fixed	Vehicles	St Philip's Marsh	New Cut	51°26′44″N 2°33′35″W	
14	St Philips Causeway Bridge (west)		400 m (1,300 ft)	Fixed	Vehicles	St Philip's Marsh	New Cut	51°26′44″N 2°33′36″W	
15	Marsh Lane Bridge		1,200 m (3,900 ft)	Fixed	Vehicles	Barton Hill	Feeder Canal	51°27′07″N 2°33′34″W	Also known as Barton Hill Bridge
16	Netham Lock Bridge (east)		500 m (1,600 ft)	Bailey	Vehicles	Netham Lock	Feeder Canal	51°27′07″N 2°33′14″W	
17	New Brislington Bridge		100 m (330 ft)	Through arch	Vehicles	Brislington East	Netham Weir	51°27′05″N 2°33′11″W	
18	St Anne's Footbridge		600 m (2,000 ft)	Warren truss	Pedestrians	St Anne's	River Avon	51°27′17″N 2°32′49″W	
19	Netham Lock Bridge (west)		600 m (2,000 ft)	Bailey	Vehicles	Netham Lock	Feeder Canal	51°27′07″N 2°33′15″W	
20	Feeder Road Footbridge		1,000 m (3,300 ft)	Fixed	Pedestrians	St Philip's Marsh	Feeder Canal	51°27′02″N 2°34′05″W	
21	Avon Street Bridge		700 m (2,300 ft)	Beam	Vehicles	St Philip's Marsh	Feeder Canal	51°26′56″N 2°34′32″W	Also known as Marsh Bridge
22	Totterdown Bridge		800 m (2,600 ft)	Truss	Vehicles	Totterdown	New Cut	51°26′36″N 2°34′23″W	
23	Banana Bridge		1,500 m (4,900 ft)	Bowstring truss	Pedestrian	Redcliffe	New Cut	51°26′44″N 2°35′07″W	Known officially as the Langton Street Bridge
24	Bedminster New Bridge		400 m (1,300 ft)	Fixed roundabout	Vehicles	Bedminster	New Cut	51°26′44″N 2°35′26″W	
25	Bedminster Old Bridge		100 m (330 ft)	Lattice truss roundabout	Vehicles	Bedminster	New Cut	51°26′45″N 2°35′30″W	Listed as Grade II
26	Lower Guinea Street Footbridge		400 m (1,300 ft)	Swing	Pedestrian	Bathurst Basin		51°26′52″N 2°35′40″W	Known officially as Bathurst Basin Footbridge and unofficially as Ostrich Bridge and The Blue Caboose
27	Bathurst Swing Bridge		200 m (660 ft)	Fixed (Note: Formerly a swing bridge before being permanently closed)	Vehicles	Bathurst Basin		51°26′47″N 2°35′46″W	Also known as Bathurst Basin Roadbridge (east)
28	Commercial Road Bridge		100 m (330 ft)	Fixed	Vehicles	Bathurst Basin		51°26′47″N 2°35′47″W	Also known as Bathurst Basin Roadbridge (west)
29	Gaol Ferry Bridge		300 m (980 ft)	Suspension / Lattice truss	Pedestrian	Wapping Wharf	New Cut	51°26′45″N 2°35′58″W	
30	Vauxhall Bridge		900 m (3,000 ft)	Lattice truss	Pedestrian	Wapping Wharf	New Cut	51°26′47″N 2°36′42″W	Listed as Grade II
31	Ashton Avenue Bridge		700 m (2,300 ft)	Through truss	Vehicles	Spike Island	New Cut	51°26′46″N 2°37′19″W	Also known as Ashton Swing Bridge. Listed as Grade II
32	Avon Bridge		300 m (980 ft)	Fixed	Vehicles	Spike Island	New Cut	51°26′49″N 2°37′25″W	Also known as Brunel Way Bridge
33	South Entrance Lock Bridge		200 m (660 ft)	Fixed	Pedestrians	Cumberland Basin		51°26′54″N 2°37′23″W	Also known as Brunel's Swing Bridge. Listed as Grade II
34	South Entrance Lock Walkway		200 m (660 ft)	Walkway	Pedestrians	Cumberland Basin		51°26′54″N 2°37′19″W	
35	Plimsoll Bridge		100 m (330 ft)	Swing	Vehicles	Cumberland Basin		51°26′55″N 2°37′21″W	
36	Clifton Suspension Bridge		1,000 m (3,300 ft)	Suspension	Vehicles	Clifton	River Avon	51°27′18″N 2°37′40″W	Listed as Grade I
37	Avonmouth Bridge		9,800 m (32,200 ft)	Box girder	Vehicles	Avonmouth	River Avon	51°29′21″N 2°41′34″W	Also known as the Avonmouth Road Bridge and the M5 Avonmouth Bridge
38	Portway Viaduct		7,000 m (23,000 ft)	Viaduct	Vehicles	Sea Mills	River Trym	51°28′51″N 2°38′55″W	Also known as Portway Bridge
39	Poole's Wharf Bridge		6,700 m (22,000 ft)	Swing	Pedestrians	Poole's Wharf	Bristol Harbour	51°26′54″N 2°36′57″W	
40	Junction Lock Bridge		100 m (330 ft)	Swing	Vehicles	Cumberland Basin		51°26′53″N 2°37′07″W	Also known as North Junction Lock Bridge
41	South Junction Lock Bridge		100 m (330 ft)	Fixed	Vehicles	Cumberland Basin		51°26′51″N 2°37′08″W	
42	Prince Street Bridge		2,000 m (6,600 ft)	Swing	Vehicles / Pedestrians	Bristol city centre	Bristol Harbour	51°26′55″N 2°35′48″W	Listed as Grade II
43	Pero's Bridge		200 m (660 ft)	Bascule	Pedestrians	St Augustine's Reach	Bristol Harbour	51°27′01″N 2°35′53″W	Unofficially known as Horned Bridge and Shrek's Bridge. Not currently accessible
44	Redcliffe Bridge		800 m (2,600 ft)	Bascule	Vehicles	Redcliffe	Bristol Harbour	51°26′58″N 2°35′32″W	Also known as Redcliffe Bascule Bridge
45	Castle Bridge		900 m (3,000 ft)	Fixed	Pedestrians	Finzels Reach	Bristol Harbour	51°27′17″N 2°35′21″W	
1	Bristol Bridge		300 m (980 ft)	Arch	Vehicles	Castle Park	Bristol Harbour	51°27′13″N 2°35′29″W	Listed as Grade II
