= Bristol Temple Quarter Enterprise Zone =

Business district in England

Coordinates: 51.446°N 2.578°W

Map of central Bristol showing some enterprise zone locations (in red)

Bristol Temple Quarter Enterprise Zone is an enterprise zone in Bristol, England, focused on creative, high-tech and low-carbon industries. Covering an area of 70 hectares (170 acres), it is based around Bristol Temple Meads railway station, which is being redeveloped by Network Rail. It also contains the area around the existing Temple Quay development, and the Silverthorne Lane and Avon Riverside areas. It includes the site of the planned Bristol Arena, and the site of the University of Bristol's Temple Quarter Enterprise Campus.

== Establishment ==
The creation of the zone was announced by Chancellor George Osborne in the Budget of March 2011, and it was launched in 2012. The zone offers streamlined planning controls and reduced business rates. Rates generated by the zone are channelled to five other areas in the region, designated Enterprise Areas. These are Avonmouth (focusing on manufacturing and distribution), Bath (media and publishing), Emersons Green including Bristol and Bath Science Park, Filton (high-tech) and Weston-super-Mare (business services). Development of the enterprise zone is coordinated by West of England Local Enterprise Partnership, Bristol City Council, the Homes and Communities Agency (HCA) and Network Rail.

== Station and surrounds ==
Network Rail is redeveloping the station, in conjunction with its electrification of the Great Western line which will cut the journey time from Temple Meads to London Paddington station to 80 minutes. Station Approach Road will be turned into a public square and the station's main entrance moved to the north side of the station. In January 2015, the council announced changes to the layout of the roads around the station, with the removal of Temple Circus roundabout and provision of better routes for pedestrians and cyclists.

Across Station Approach from the station, the Temple Gate redevelopment by TCN UK is a creative and digital campus for small and medium-sized enterprises. Redeveloped buildings include Bristol and Exeter House and Temple Studios. The latter opened in 2013.

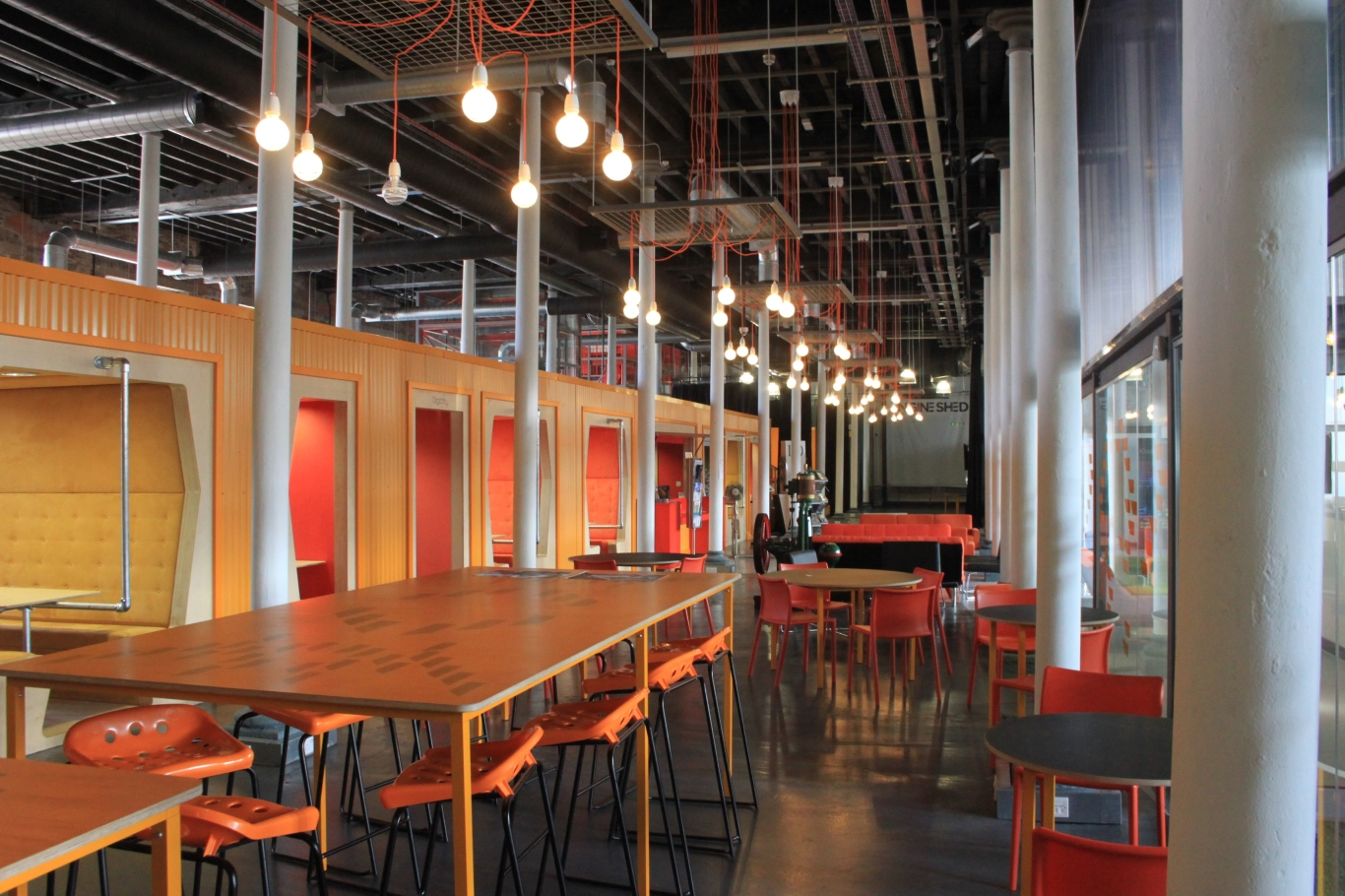
Engine Shed's lounge area

Engine Shed is a new use for part of the Old Station, Brunel's original building, in partnership with the University of Bristol. Opened in December 2013, it hosts business incubators, including SETsquared and WebStart Bristol, which support a cluster of hi-tech startup companies. Engine Shed leases its office space to the incubators, who in turn sub-let space on more flexible terms to the companies, which are selected for their high growth potential, and high expected benefits for the regional economy. In December 2015, with the building fully occupied, additional space was made available in the form of Boxworks, which was rapidly constructed by ForwardSpace next to Engine Shed using 20 shipping containers. This was intended to be a temporary solution until an Engine Shed 2 is built. Public consultation for Engine Shed 2 took place in November 2016.

== Temple Quarter Campus ==
In November 2016, the University of Bristol announced that it will build a £300 million Temple Quarter Campus for c. 5,000 students, directly to the east of the station. It will replace an empty sorting office building, formerly operated by Royal Mail but derelict since 1997. The campus, which will include a new business school, digital research facilities and a student village, is expected to open in 2021. It will also host Engine Shed 2.

== Arena Island ==
'Arena Island' in April 2026

The zone's biggest development site, sometimes known as 'Arena Island', is south of the station and across the River Avon. Formerly occupied by the Bristol Bath Road depot, the site was acquired by the Homes and Communities Agency. In February 2014 Bristol Council agreed the financing of the arena, which including funding provided by the West of England Local Enterprise Partnership totals £91 million. The winner of the competition to design the arena, the architectural firm Populous, was announced in March 2015. In the same month, the HCA gave the arena site to Bristol City Council.

In 2013 the HCA agreed to fund an £11 million road bridge over the river, to link Cattle Market Road to the site of the planned arena. Construction of the 63-metre (207 ft) bridge took place from March to September 2015. It has lanes for cars, bicycles and pedestrians. In March 2016, the bridge was named Brock's Bridge, after William Brock (1830–1907), a local builder and entrepreneur.

== Temple Quay ==
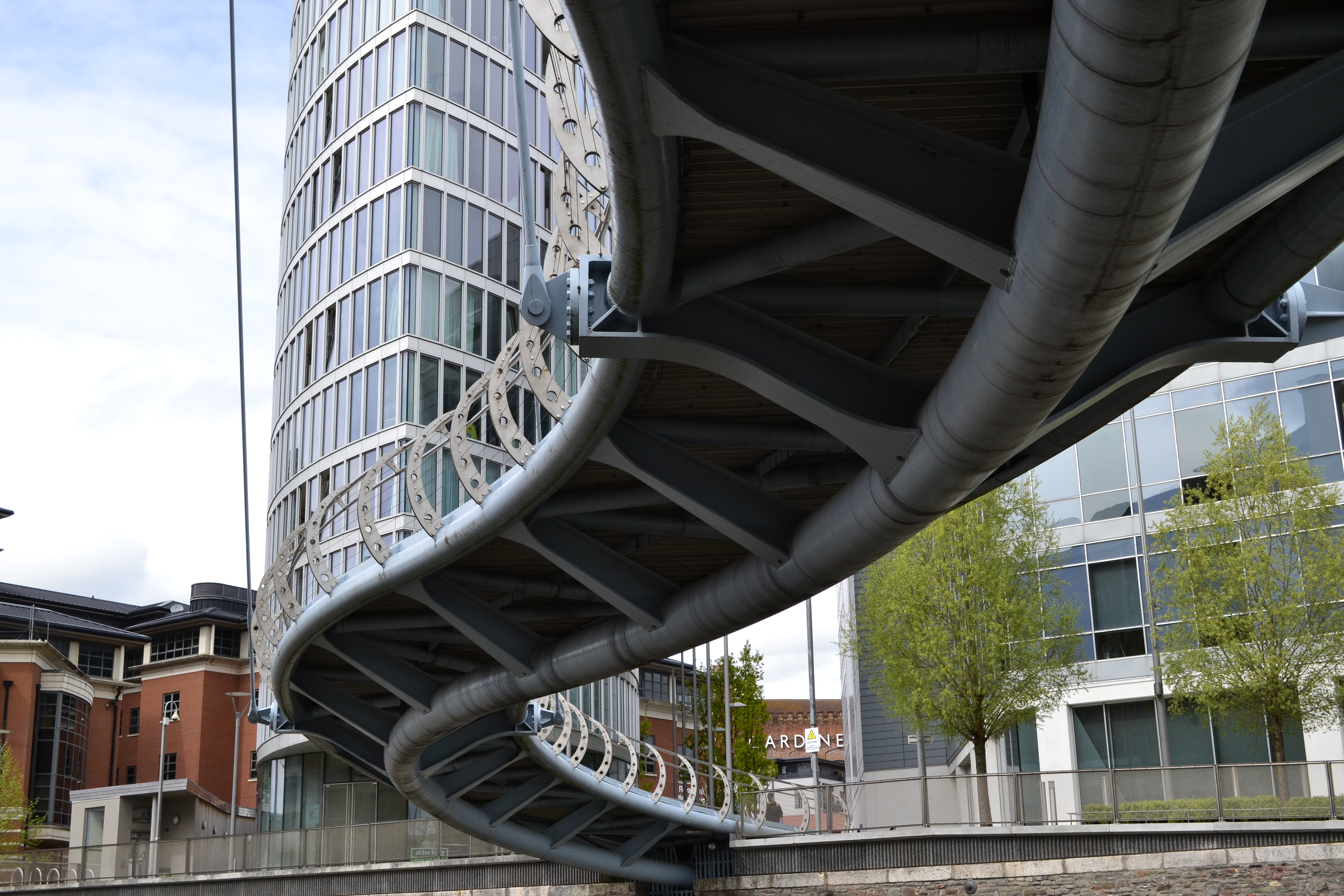
Valentine Bridge in Temple Quay

Temple Quay is an area of mixed-use development on a site to the northwest of the station, where the station's goods yard was formerly located. The development project was initiated in 1989 by Bristol Development Corporation, who originally called it Quay Point. In 1995, the corporation transferred its rights on the site to English Partnerships, and development started in 1998. The developer was Castlemore Securities. By 2002, the development south of Bristol Floating Harbour was largely complete and a new phase was started on the other side of the harbour, called Temple Quay North. Castlemore went into administration in 2009, but development continued in the hands of the administrator, PricewaterhouseCoopers.

In 2015, Entrepreneurial Spark, a UK-wide business incubator network, opened a hub on the top floor of the Royal Bank of Scotland's Trinity Quay building in Temple Quay North. Managed by NatWest, the hub provides free space, facilities and guidance for startups.

== Avon Riverside ==
The Avon Riverside area extends along the A4 Bath Road, and Bristol's so-called 'media mile', as far as the site of Paintworks, an existing mixed-use development by Verve. Phase III of Paintworks will be the development of a 'creative skills hub' for digital and media businesses, in partnership with Creative Skillset.
