= Sparke Evans Park =

Park in Bristol, England

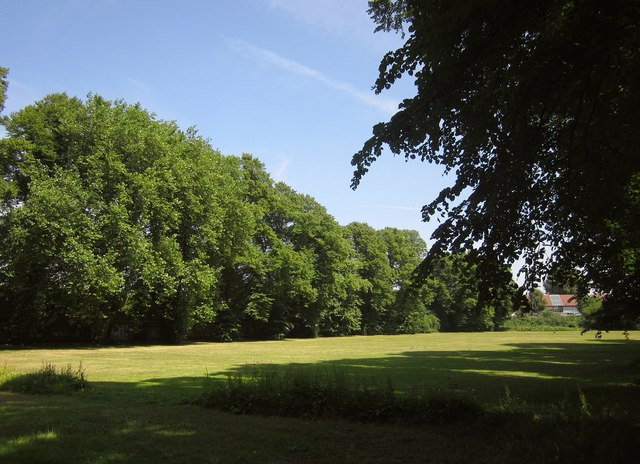
- A view of the southern path of the park with the cycleway milepost
- Interactive map of Sparke Evans Park
- Type: Pocket park
- Location: St Philips Marsh, Bristol, England
- Coordinates: 51.4454°N 2.5634°W
- Area: 2.71 hectares (6.7 acres)
- Created: 1902
- Operated by: Bristol City Council
- Status: Open all year

Sparke Evans Park is a public park on the northern bank of the River Avon in the St Philips Marsh area of Bristol, England. Established in 1902, it was donated to the city by the Sparke Evans family, local industrialists. The park lies off Albert Road and is linked to the Paintworks development in Brislington by the Sparke Evans Park Bridge.

== History ==
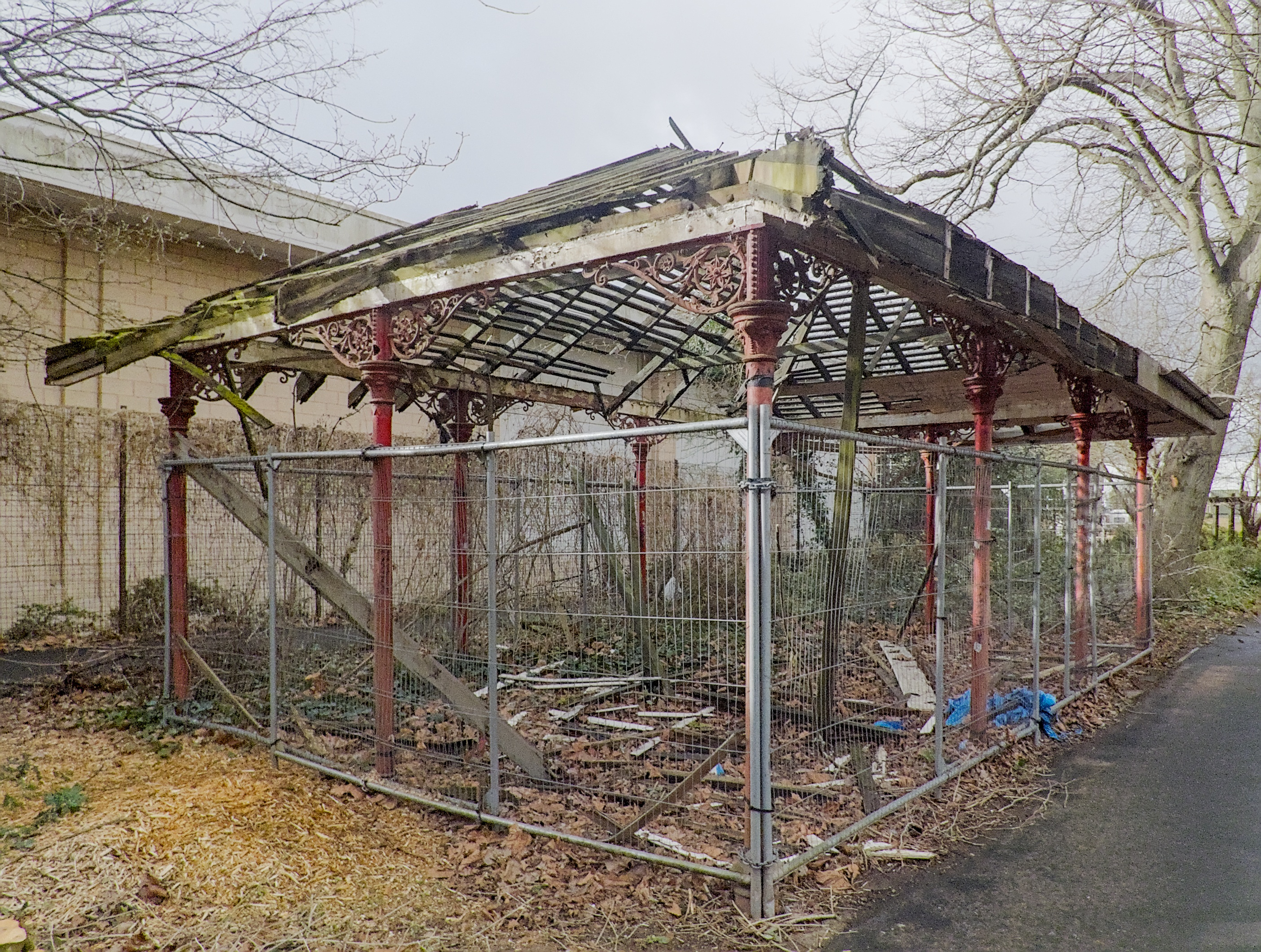
The ruined pavilion in the park

The land for the park was gifted to the Bristol Corporation in 1902 by Peter Fabyan Sparke Evans (1826–1905) and his brother Jonathan Evans. Peter Fabyan Sparke Evans was a long-serving Bristol magistrate, sitting on the bench for about 24 years before withdrawing in later life because of deafness. He was a major local employer through the Avonside Tannery on Feeder Road, and known for his involvement in charitable work in the city. The Evans brothers, as partners in the tannery, were also members of the Committee for Promoting the Better Housing of the Poor. The donation of land was thus intended to provide a recreation ground for the industrial workforce of St Philips Marsh. The land itself occupied an area of former arable land once known locally as the Bean Field. The brothers, in a letter to the Lord Mayor Sir Robert Henry Symes dated 16 July 1902, outlined their vision for this new park:

Dear Lord Mayor,—My brother and I have much pleasure in sending the enclosed for acceptance of the Town Council on behalf of the city of Bristol.—I am, yours truly, Jonathan L. Evans.

Considerable experience with day and Sunday schools, and especially our connection with the working classes in some of the most populous parts of the city, have shown the great need there is for more open spaces, and this fact induces us to offer to the Town Council about seven acres of land in St. Philip’s Marsh, adjoining the river Avon, for pleasure grounds and play-fields. We do not wish to hamper the gift with unnecessary restrictions, but constant observation and experience in school treats have shown us the very great inconvenience to which large numbers of school children are exposed when taken to a considerable distance where there is no shelter from the weather. We suggest, therefore, the erection at one end of the play-fields of suitable accommodation for women and girls, and a gymnasium for men and boys at the other end, with appliances for large and numerous tea gatherings. It is painful to observe in many of the courts and lanes of the city an almost entire absence of flowers. The erection indicated above might be used during the winter months as shelters for cottage window plants. The proximity of the land to the river tends to make it convenient for large open-air swimming baths or bath, and as possibly the dam across the river at Totterdown may be carried out, there would be alongside the land a fine stretch of water from that point to Netham suitable for boating. The disused towing path could be planted with quick growing trees, such as poplars, plane, and chestnut, and if provided with seats would furnish a pleasant walk or rest for those who most need it. As this position (from the increase of the city) may at a future time become more valuable, it may be desirable to exchange it for a more advantageous site of larger extent, or it may possibly be enlarged by the addition of adjoining land. We wish to make one condition, and that is that a permanent notice should be legibly placed stating that this land is given particularly for the use of the old, the young, and the infirm, to remain for ever non-political and undenominational, but free to all.

— P. F. Sparke Evans and Jonathan L. Evans (letter dated 16 July 1902),

In their reporting of the donation, the Western Daily Press suggested the names Evans Coronation Park and Evans Gardens, influenced by the naming of Greville Smyth Park the day prior (July 17). The gift was formally acknowledged by the city council later that month, with councillors voting to convey their thanks to the donors. The Bristol Sanitary Committee subsequently recorded that the council had accepted the land for use as a recreation ground, and arranged a site visit in August 1902. After the gift was accepted, the corporation undertook the park's initial laying-out and added basic amenities. Peter Fabyan Sparke Evans died in July 1905 and was buried at Arnos Vale Cemetery. After his death, civic leaders referred in public proceedings to his long service as a city magistrate and to the parkland gift. The park's development was among a broader late-19th- and early-20th-century programme in which Bristol created or adopted multiple municipal parks, alongside sites such as St George Park, Gaunts Ham Park, and Fishponds Park.

In 1910, the development of the park was accelerated through unemployment relief schemes coordinated by the Bristol Distress Committee. To alleviate local poverty, the committee employed hundreds of men in four-day shifts to level the ground at Sparke Evans Park and improve Conham Road, funded partly by a Lord Mayor's appeal. In a May 1910 report regarding the relief works, the Bristol Distress Committee stated that 633 men had been employed on projects including the leveling of Sparke Evans Park and improvements to Conham Road. The workers were organised into two groups working alternate four-day shifts, and the total wages paid for these specific works amounted to £2,111 7s 5d. A subsequent appeal published by the Lord Mayor stated that works of public utility were intended at Sparke Evans Park and other open spaces across the city, with the appeal framed as funding paid employment rather than charitable relief. By 1913, further improvements were proposed to make the park suitable for the local poor, with an estimated cost of £250; it was noted that two-thirds of this work would utilise unskilled labour. By 1914, public demand led to the installation of additional seating to accommodate holiday visitors. During World War I, the Bristol Sanitary Committee attempted to rent out the park's grassland for sheep grazing, though they initially struggled to find tenders compared to other city parks like Eastville Park.

By the mid-1920s, the park was described in the local press as a valued place of respite for the industrial workforce of St Philip's Marsh. It was divided into a pleasure garden with herbaceous borders and a dedicated sports area for cricket and football. The park also historically had a strong reputation for the quality of its rosebeds. This has been linked to the park's proximity to the railway sidings at St Philip's Marsh depot, suggesting soot reduced the incidence of rose black spot during the steam era. However, the leisure focus and facilities of the park diminished due to the clearance of houses in the area as it became increasingly industralised.

In 1990, proposals to redesign the park's bandstand and Victorian rose garden were scheduled for discussion at a public meeting, with local residents invited to comment on the plans. In May 1991, a 1.5 acres (0.61 ha) section was re-designated as a pocket park and wildlife haven following a £20,000 regeneration project involving the Bristol Development Corporation, Commercial Union, and the Groundwork Trust that refurbished the rose garden and planted a wildflower meadow. However, the park suffered repeated arson attacks in the mid-1990s; the wooden sports pavilion was destroyed in August 1994, and a groundsman's hut used by Arnos Town Junior F.C. was burnt down in May 1995, destroying £2,000 of equipment and threatening the club's league status.

== Sparke Evans Park Bridge ==
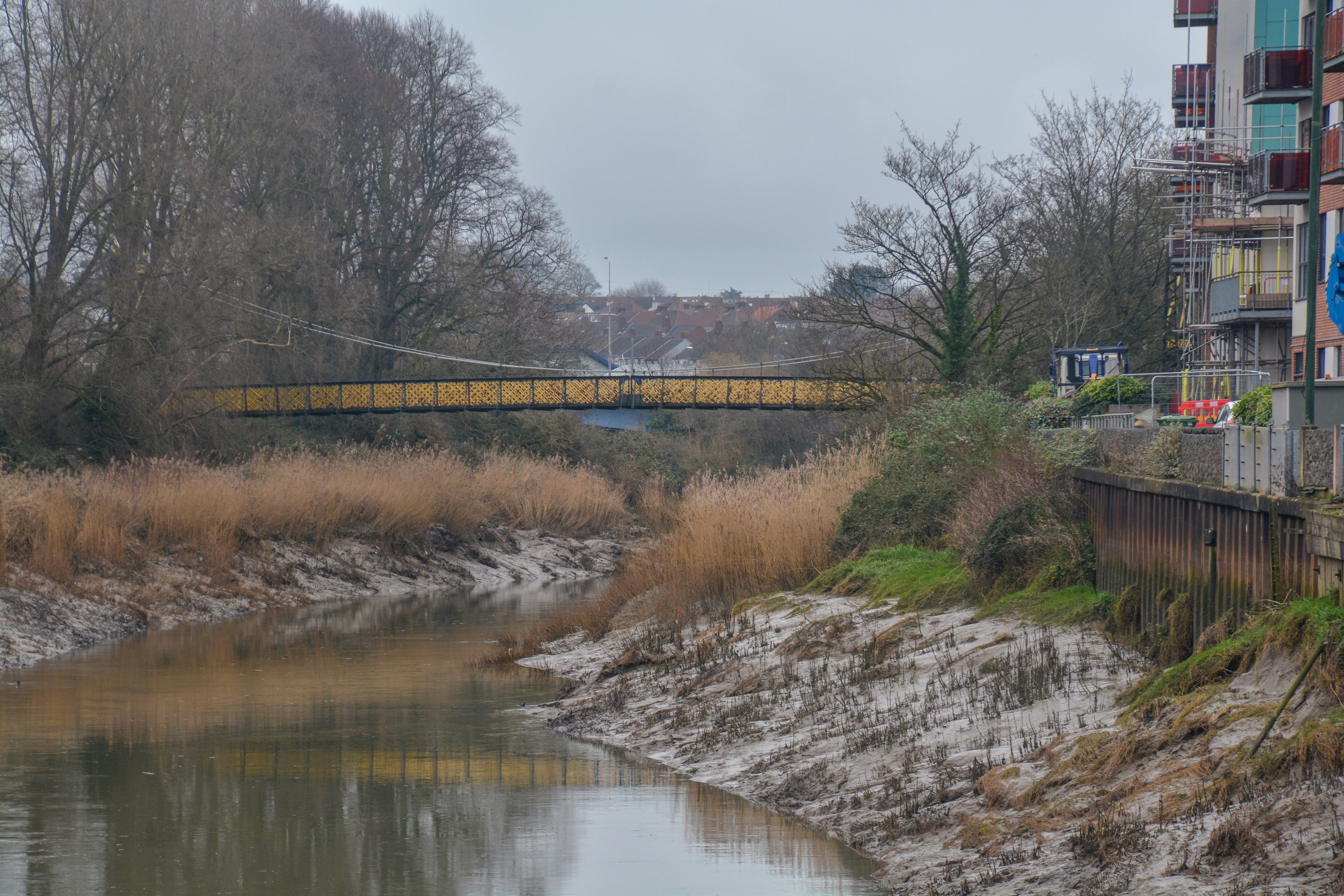
Sparke Evans Bridge crossing the New Cut

A prominent feature of the park is the Sparke Evans Park Bridge, a suspension footbridge connecting the park on the north bank to the Paintworks development on the south bank. The bridge was built in 1933 by the Bristol engineering firm John Lysaght and Co. It was designed by David Rowell & Co of London, the same firm responsible for the design of the Gaol Ferry Bridge in Bristol. The structure is a light steel suspension footbridge featuring steel basket balustrades. It measures 58 metres in length with a span width of 3.10 metres.

By the early 2020s, the bridge had fallen into disrepair, with reports of corroded steelwork, rotting timbers, and disintegrating latticework. The structure was notably prone to wobbling when crossed. The bridge was closed to the public on 30 October 2023 for a major restoration project, budgeted at approximately £2 million and funded by the West of England Combined Authority (WECA). The restoration involved the removal of decking, masonry repairs, the repair of suspension cables and metalwork, and a full repaint. While the structural restoration was largely completed on schedule for an October 2025 reopening, the ramp was deemed non-compliant with modern accessibility standards due to its steep gradient. This issue had been omitted from the original funding scope. Consequently, the reopening was delayed until February then March 2026 to allow for the construction of a new ramp. Contractors discovered the ramp was in a worse structural condition than anticipated, requiring new ground investigations and the installation of new piles before the replacement structure could be installed.

== Ecology ==
Although bordered by major roads and industrial land, the park is screened in places by mature trees. The tidal Avon alongside it forms part of a local wildlife corridor, with common waterbirds recorded on the river reach beside the park. Despite the industrial surroundings, the riverbanks support a variety of wildlife. Bird species observed in the park and adjacent river include tufted ducks, mallards, coots, and moorhens. The ecological corridor created by the cutting and the park also supports badger setts in the vicinity. The riverbank in the area is at risk of erosion, with sections of footpath and trees collapsing into the river in the past.

== Facilities ==
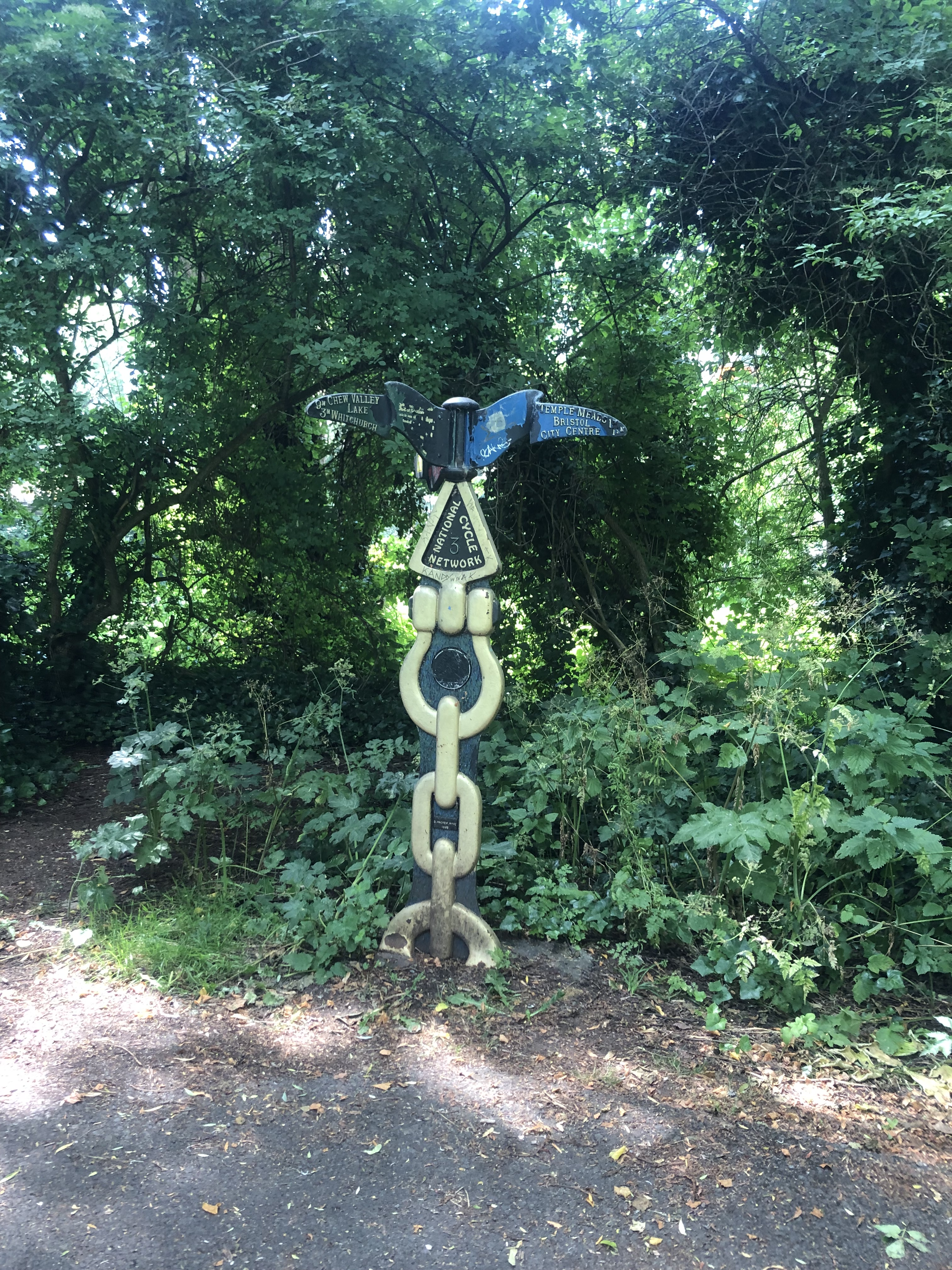
The signpost for NCN Route 3

Sparke Evans Park forms a narrow riverside green space beside the Avon Walkway and National Cycle Network, set within an area of warehouses and other commercial premises. Among the surviving park furniture is an early-20th-century shelter structure, which has been damaged in the past.

Historically, the park served as a primary destination for local Sunday School outings, with children often transported there in coal carts. In the 1920s, musical entertainment was provided by a band that performed at the bandstand on the second Monday of every month.

=== Walking and cycling routes ===
The park sits on a riverside walking-and-cycling corridor along the New Cut, with access from the Avon Walkway and the National Cycle Network. The bridge is also included in the Bristol Bridges Walk, a circular route linking dozens of crossings around the Floating Harbour and the New Cut.

=== Sports ===
The park has historically been used for sports, primarily local amateur football teams, though the football pitches are no longer present today. The St Philip's Marsh Adult School football club played their first matches at the park upon their formation in the early 1920s. However, the proximity to the River Avon posed challenges for players, as during high tide footballs kicked out of bounds were frequently lost to the river. By the late 1950s the park was being used for fixtures in the Bristol and District Premier Combination, including matches involving St Silas.

In September 1980, the park hosted a Past v Present reunion match for the St Philip's Marsh Adult School F.C. to mark the club's 60th anniversary. The event attracted hundreds of spectators, many of whom were former local residents who had been displaced when the surrounding housing was demolished in the late 1950s and early 1960s. Attempts were also made to improve sporting facilities around this time, with Victoria Park F.C. applying for planning permission in 1984 to install a portable building from the Ridings School to serve as dressing rooms, as their promotion to the Avon Premier Combination league was conditional on improved facilities. In July 1998, Bristol City Council proposed a 25-year lease of 5,461 square metres (1.35 acres) of parkland to a local football club for a pitch and changing facility, a move that would have restricted public access to that specific area on match days.

== See also ==
- Parks of Bristol
