= Temple Quay =

Area of Bristol, England

Coordinates: 51.451°N 2.583°W

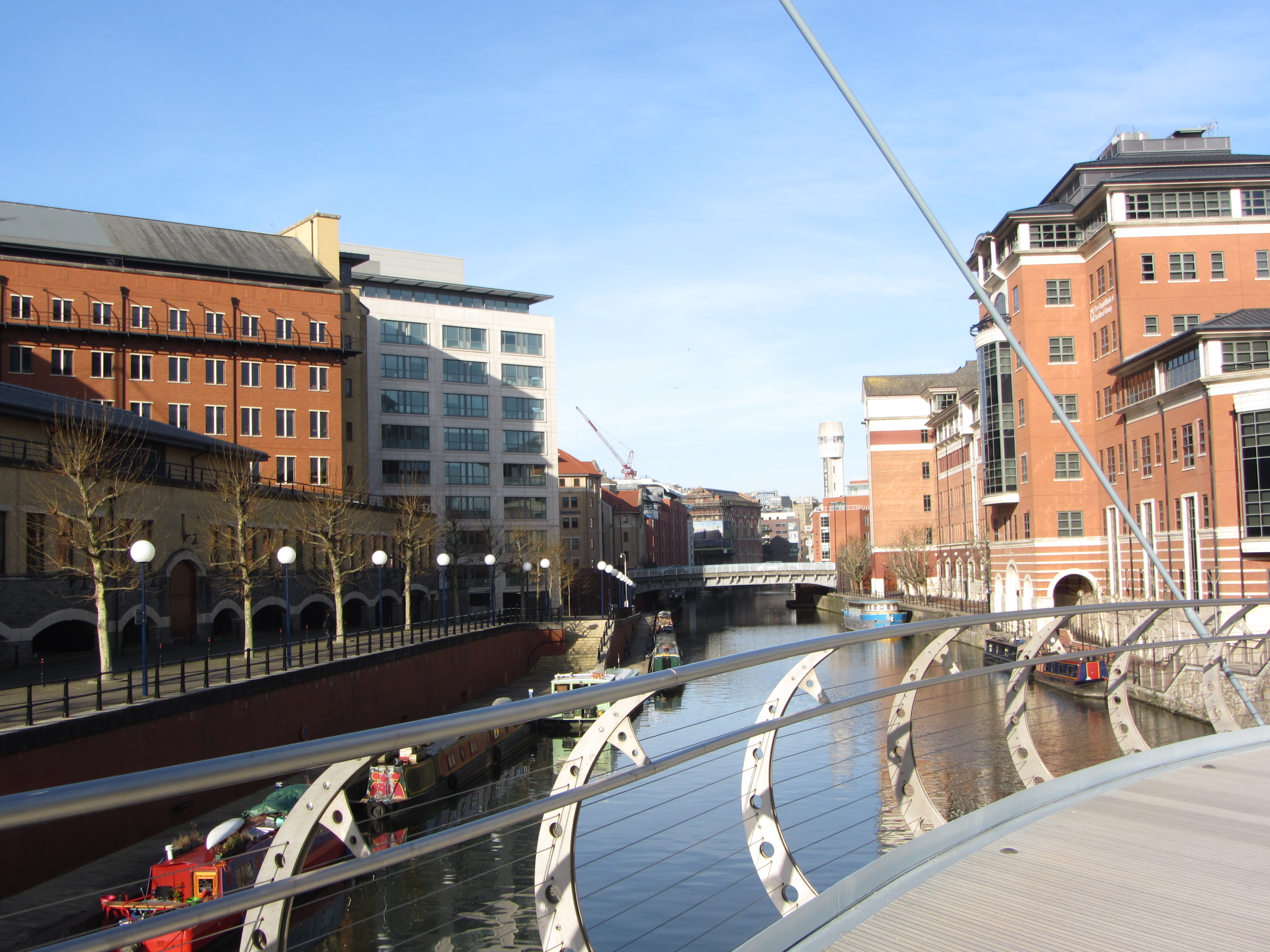
Temple Quay seen from Valentine Bridge. Bristol and West Building on the left, RBS's Trinity Quay on the right

Temple Quay is an area of mixed-use development in central Bristol, England. The project was initiated by Bristol Development Corporation in 1989, under the name Quay Point until 1995. In that year it was handed over to English Partnerships, under whom development eventually started in 1998. It is bounded by Temple Way (the A4044) to the west and Bristol Temple Meads railway station to the southeast; to the northeast the development was bounded by Bristol Floating Harbour until 2002, when development of Temple Quay North started on the harbour's other side. In 2012 the whole area became part of Bristol Temple Quarter Enterprise Zone.

Temple Quay includes a significant amount of office accommodation occupied by UK Government departments and agencies including Homes England, The Planning Inspectorate, Insolvency Service, Care Quality Commission, Ofsted and English Heritage.

== History ==
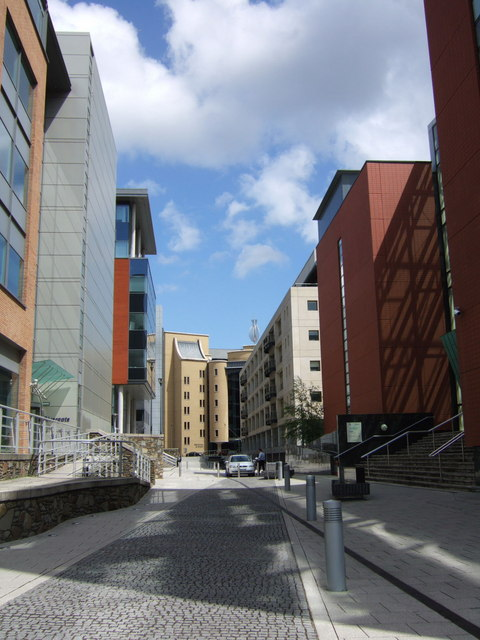
Rivergate, a new street within Temple Quay, which follows the course of the medieval Portwall

A section of the Portwall, which was a part of Bristol's 13th-century city wall, with a deep ditch on its outer side, formerly ran from southwest to northeast across the site of the modern development. This section ran from the medieval Temple Gate, at the end of modern Redcliffe Way, to the medieval river bank, now the Floating Harbour, where the wall terminated with a fortified tower called Tower Harratz. The wall's course through the site in medieval times was marked up to the 20th century by Pipe Lane.

From 1841, the area southeast of Pipe Lane was developed by the Great Western Railway as a goods yard for Temple Meads station. The original goods shed, built by Isambard Kingdom Brunel in 1841–2, was soon extended, and a dock was excavated alongside it, to allow the transfer of goods on and off barges in the Floating Harbour. The goods shed was rebuilt and expanded in 1874–6, when the dock was filled in and replaced with a new barge wharf, and again in 1924. It was eventually closed in August 1982 and demolished.

Originally called Quay Point, the Temple Quay development was the largest project initiated by Bristol Development Corporation. From 1989 to 1995 the corporation considered office or retail possibilities, until in 1995 it decided on a mixed-use development, to also include residential use, and named it Temple Quay. In December 1995, not yet having found a developer for the site, and about to be wound down, the corporation transferred its rights on the site to English Partnerships. In 1998 work began on remodelling the road access via Temple Gate. The developer eventually found for Temple Quay was Castlemore Securities. When Castlemore went into administration in 2009, development continued in the hands of the administrator, PricewaterhouseCoopers.

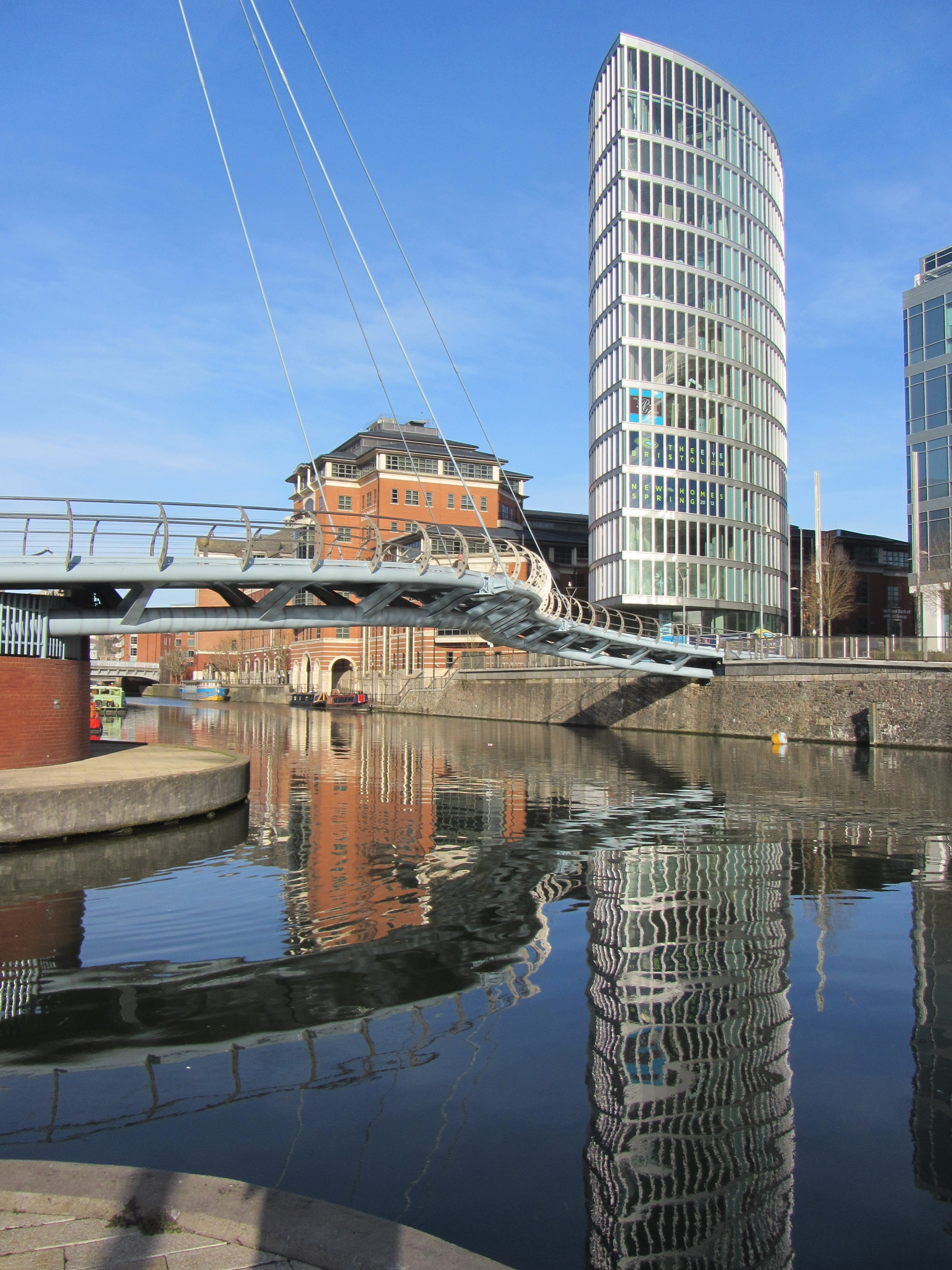
Valentine Bridge and The Eye

The Bristol and West Building, completed in 2000 to a monolithic butterfly plan, dominated the waterfront. By 2002, the development south of the Floating Harbour was largely complete and a new phase was started on the other side of the harbour, called Temple Quay North. This includes The Eye, a 13-storey tower which is eye-shaped in plan. In September 2001, BT Group relocated some 650 staff from its long-time South-West headquarters at Mercury House into new offices in Temple Quay North.

In 2004 Six Portwall Markers, a sculptural group by John Aiken consisting of a sequence of six black granite blocks, was positioned along Rivergate, the modern street which follows the course of the Portwall. There is a view through the northernmost one down to the remains of a medieval watergate. Further north, the foundations of Tower Harratz lie under the Bristol and West Building.

An S-shaped footbridge, supported by a raking mast, was built across the harbour in 2000, named Valentine Bridge. Another footbridge, named Meads Reach, was built in 2008, entirely out of stainless steel. It is covered in 55,000 perforations, which create vivid lighting effects at night. The surface was given dimples for slip resistance, but in 2015 it was coated with polyurea to provide a better non-slip surface.

In 2012, the entire Temple Quay development area became part of Bristol's enterprise zone, the Bristol Temple Quarter Enterprise Zone.

In August 2015, Entrepreneurial Spark, a UK-wide business incubator network, opened a hub on the top floor of the Royal Bank of Scotland's Trinity Quay building in Temple Quay North. Managed by NatWest, the hub provides free space, facilities and guidance for startup companies. 80 companies were selected for the first intake in 2015. Intakes occur every six months, with the most promising companies allowed to stay for up to 18 months.
