= Banana Bridge =

Footbridge in Bristol, England

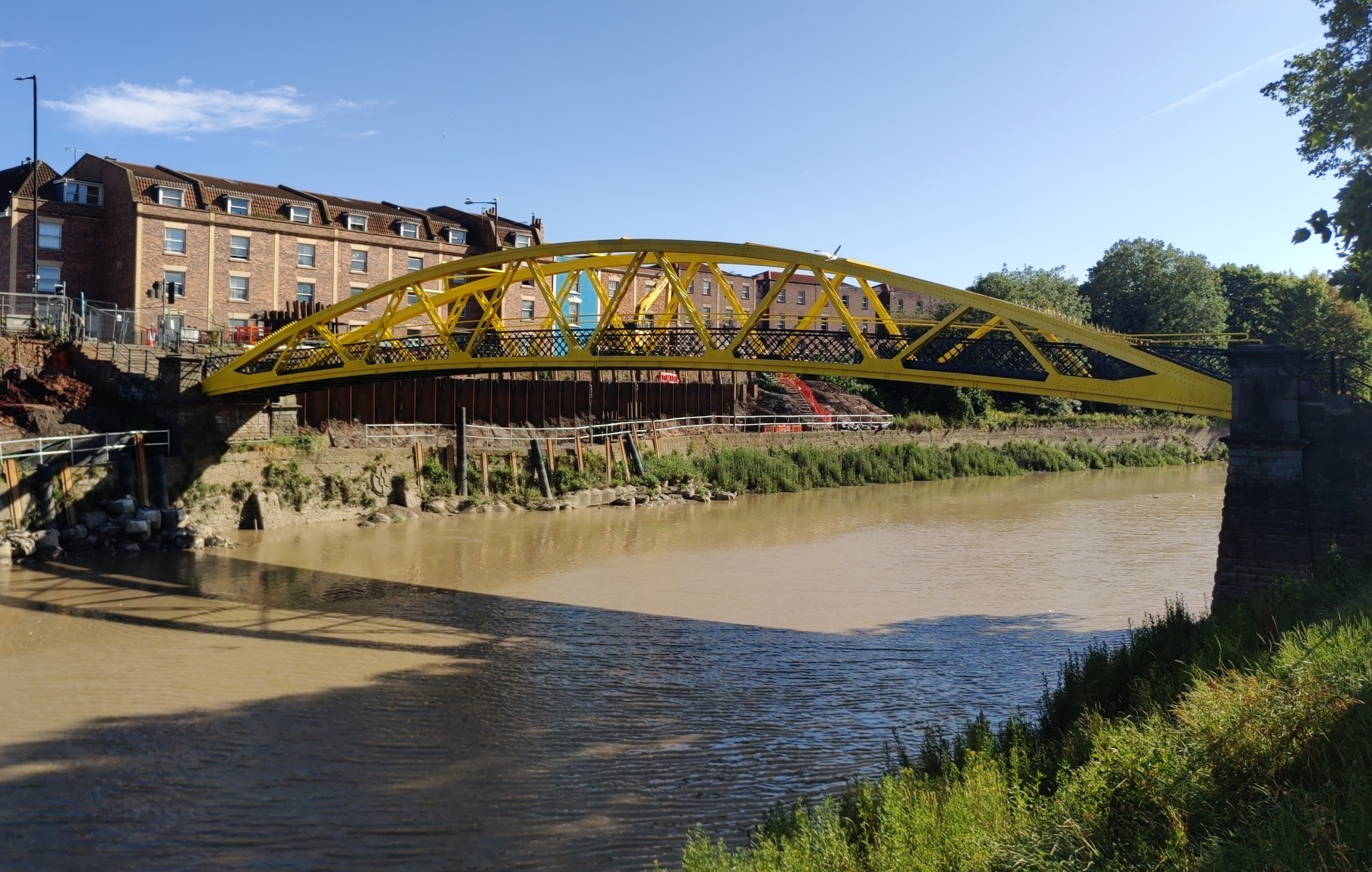
- Banana Bridge in 2025
- Coordinates: 51°26′44.32″N 2°35′7.24″W
- Carries: Pedestrians and cyclists
- Crosses: New Cut, River Avon
- Official name: Langton Street Bridge
- Named for: Langton Street, a nearby road that is no longer present
- Preceded by: Bath Bridge
- Followed by: Bedminster Bridge

Characteristics
- Total length: 134 ft (41 m)

History
- Designer: Mr. F. Ashmead (borough engineer)
- Constructed by: Edward Finch & Co of Chepstow
- Construction start: 1882
- Opened: 1883

Location
- Interactive map of Banana Bridge

Banana Bridge, officially Langton Street Bridge, is a wrought iron arched bowstring footbridge that crosses the New Cut, part of the River Avon flowing through Bristol, England. It is Grade II listed.

When it was constructed in 1883 between Langton Street and St. Luke's Road, the bridge was said to be a temporary route while the nearby Bedminster Bridge was rebuilt. Langton Street has since been lost to bombings in World War 2. Upon completion of Bedminster Bridge in 1884, the temporary bridge was moved upstream to its current position near the former location of Langton Street.

== Repair and refurbishment ==
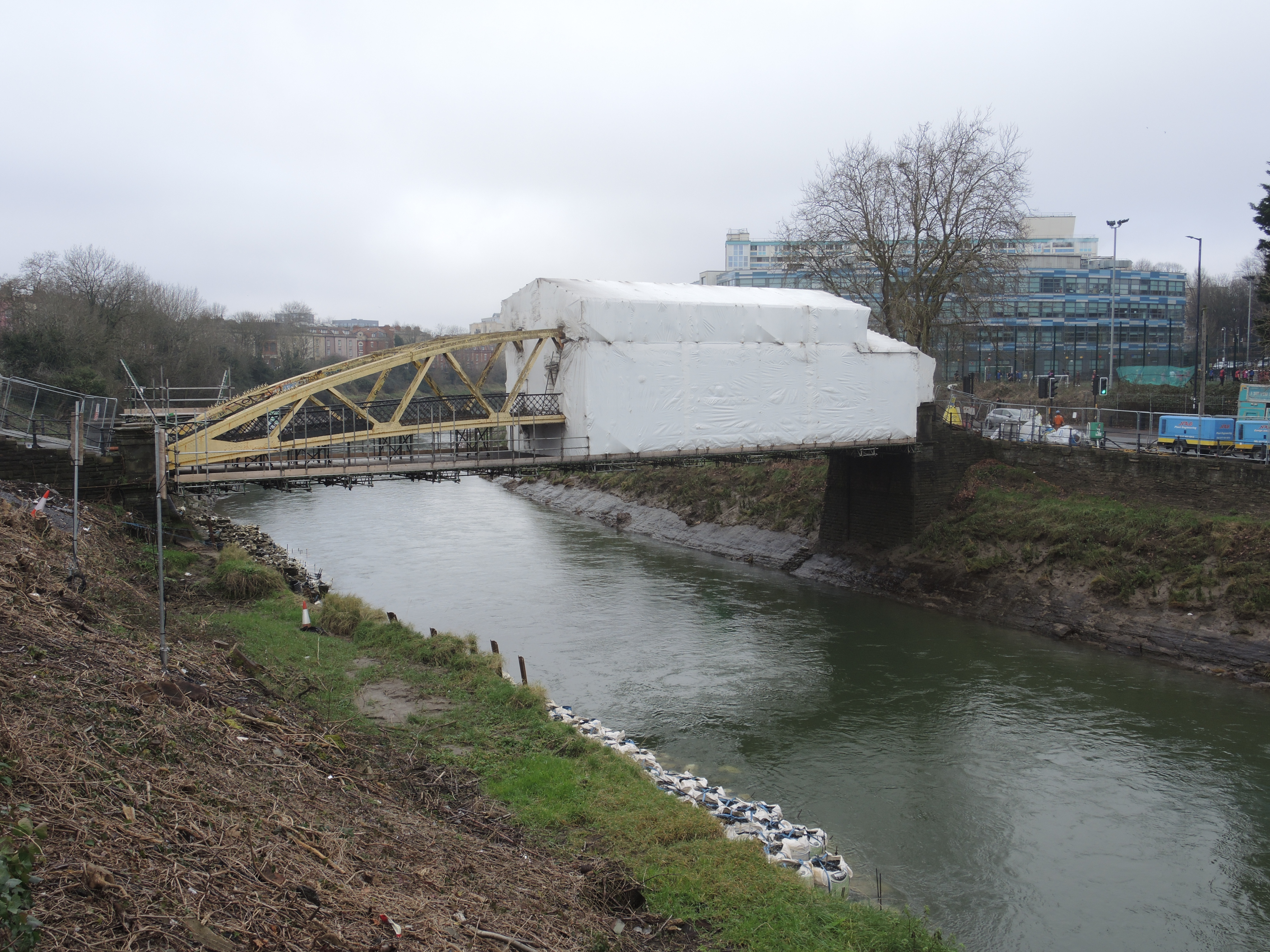
Langton Street Bridge undergoing repairs in January 2025

Between May 2024 and June 2025, Langton Street Bridge was closed for repairs at a cost of £1.4 million as part of Bristol City Council's New Cut Bridges Restoration Programme. The project involved repairs to the bridge's structure, masonry, and decking and also included the installation of a new handrail. The bridge re-opened on 20 June 2025.
