= St Philip's Footbridge =

Footbridge in Bristol, England

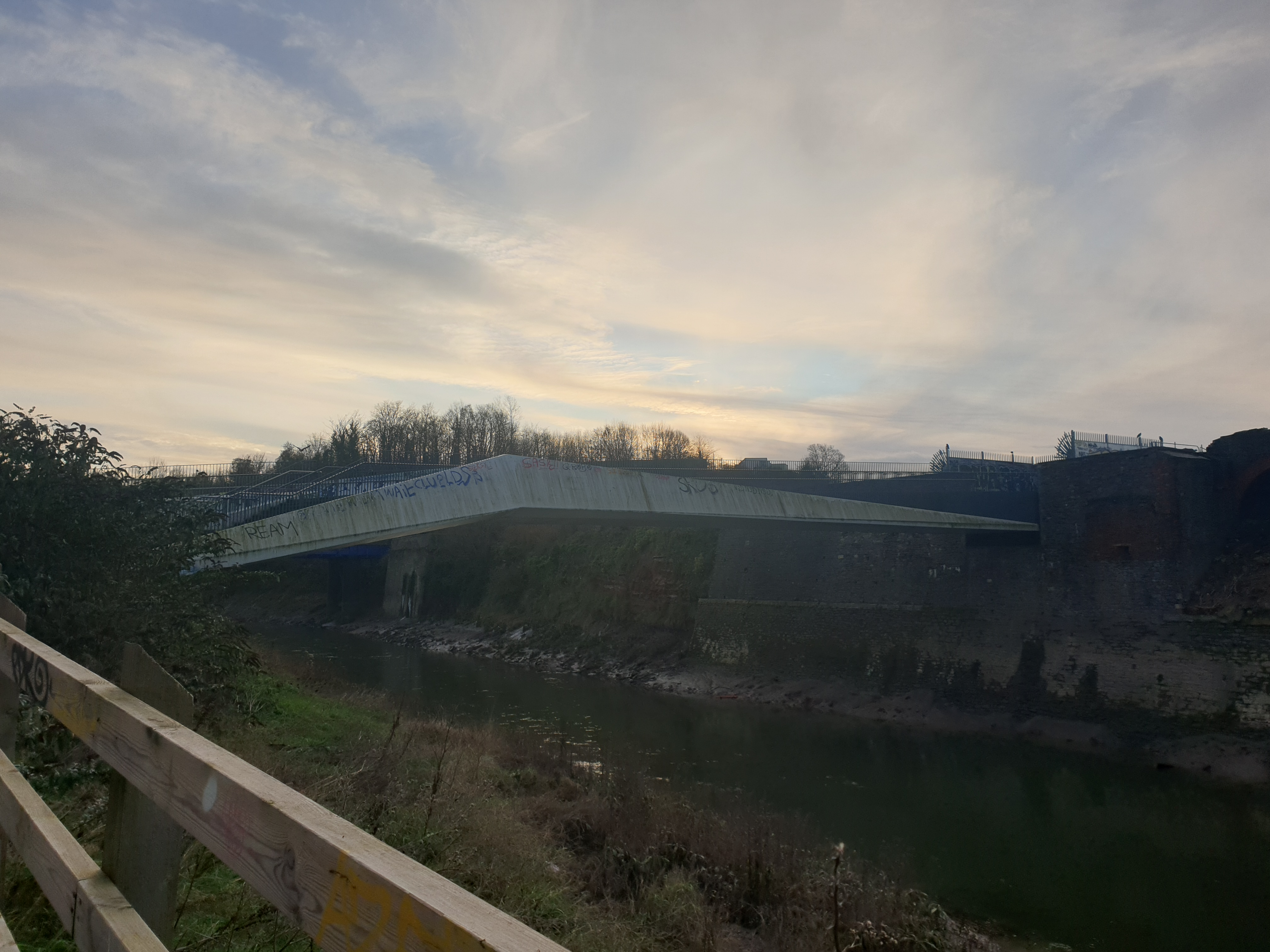
- Coordinates: 51°26′47.5″N 2°34′38.19″W
- Crosses: River Avon
- Followed by: Brock's Bridge

History
- Construction start: 2017
- Construction end: 2019
- Construction cost: £3 million

Location
- Interactive map of St Philip's Footbridge

St Philip's Footbridge is a footbridge in Bristol, England, that crosses the River Avon. It is currently only accessible from the east as the western entrance has been fenced off.

== History ==
The bridge was commissioned in 2015 by the mayor of Bristol at the time George Ferguson. A planning application was submitted in January 2016. Construction began in August 2017. The bridge was designed to allow access to the planned Bristol Arena, however, the project was scrapped in September 2018. The bridge was completed in 2019 at a cost of £3 million.

== Design ==
The bridge is 50 metres (160 feet) long and 4 metres (13 feet) wide. It was designed by Knight Architects. The bridge has a "Y" shape with one branch containing stairs and the other a ramp.
