= Bedminster Bridge =

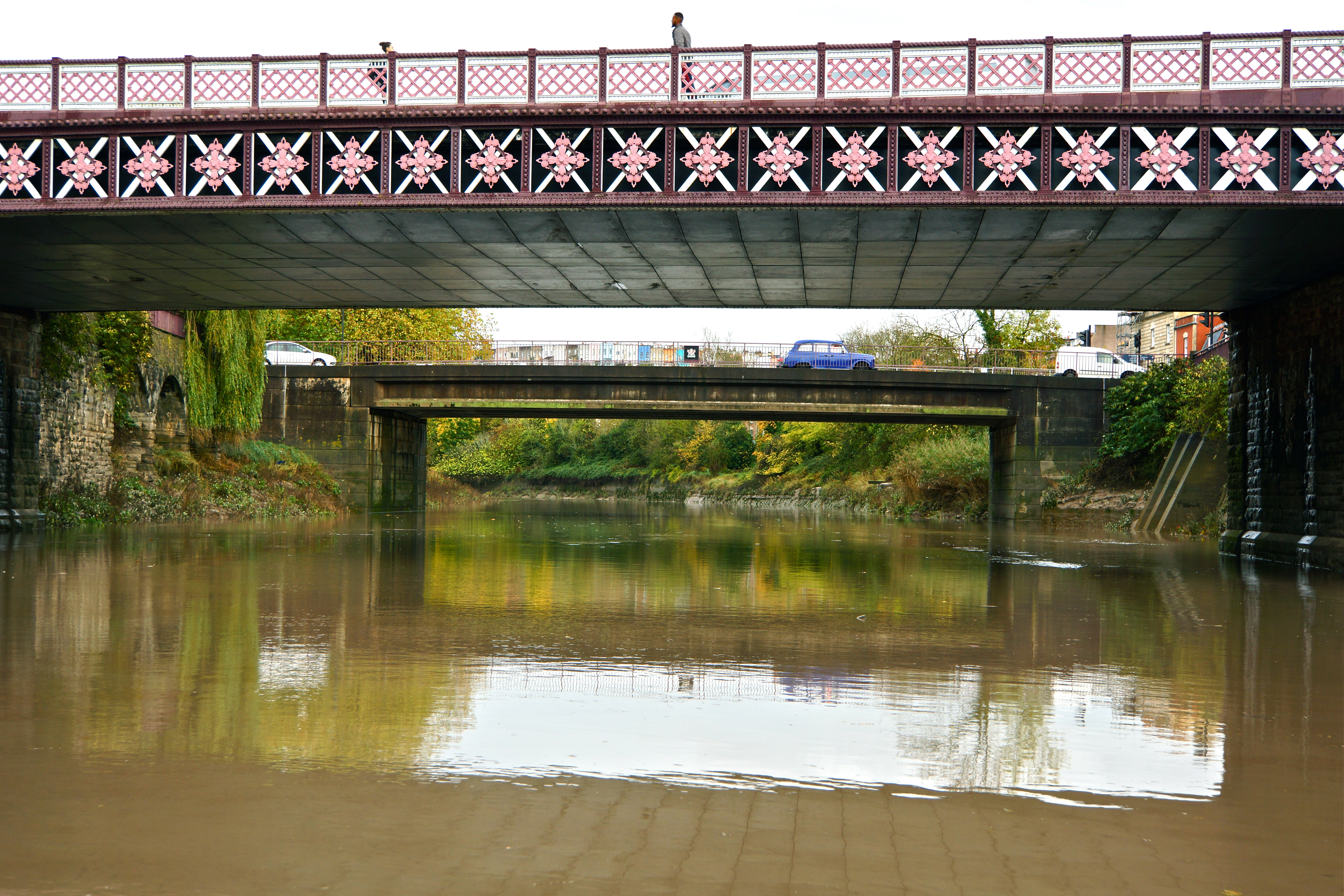
- Both Bedminster bridges, with the Old Bridge nearer the camera
- Coordinates: 51°26′44.632″N 2°35′30.030″W
- Carries: Road traffic
- Crosses: New Cut of the River Avon
- Locale: Bristol
- Owner: Bristol City Council
- Preceded by: Langton Street Bridge
- Followed by: Gaol Ferry Bridge

History
- Construction end: 1809 (Harford’s); 1883 (Bedminster Old); 1960s (Bedminster New)

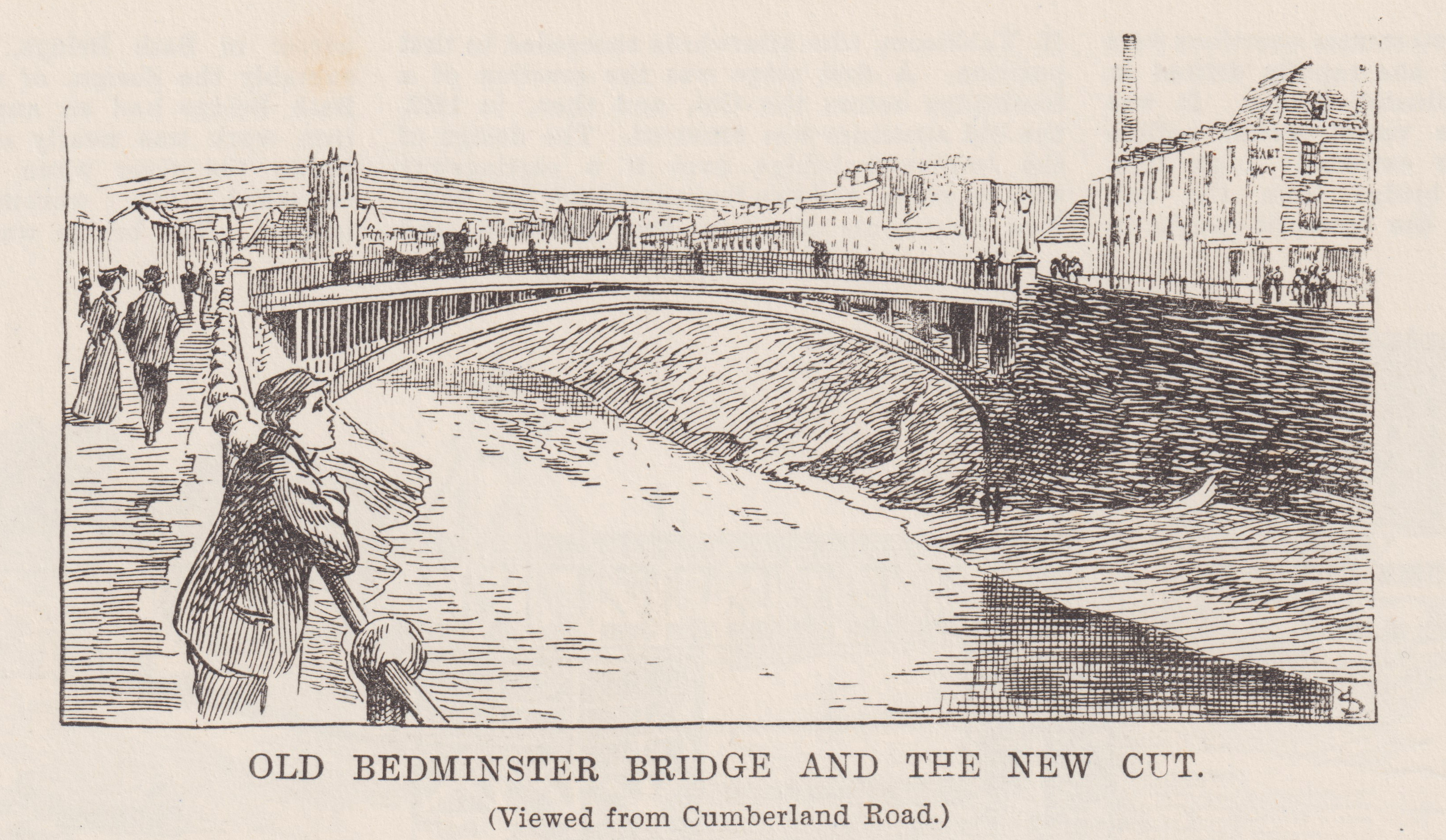
Old Bedminster Bridge, 1908

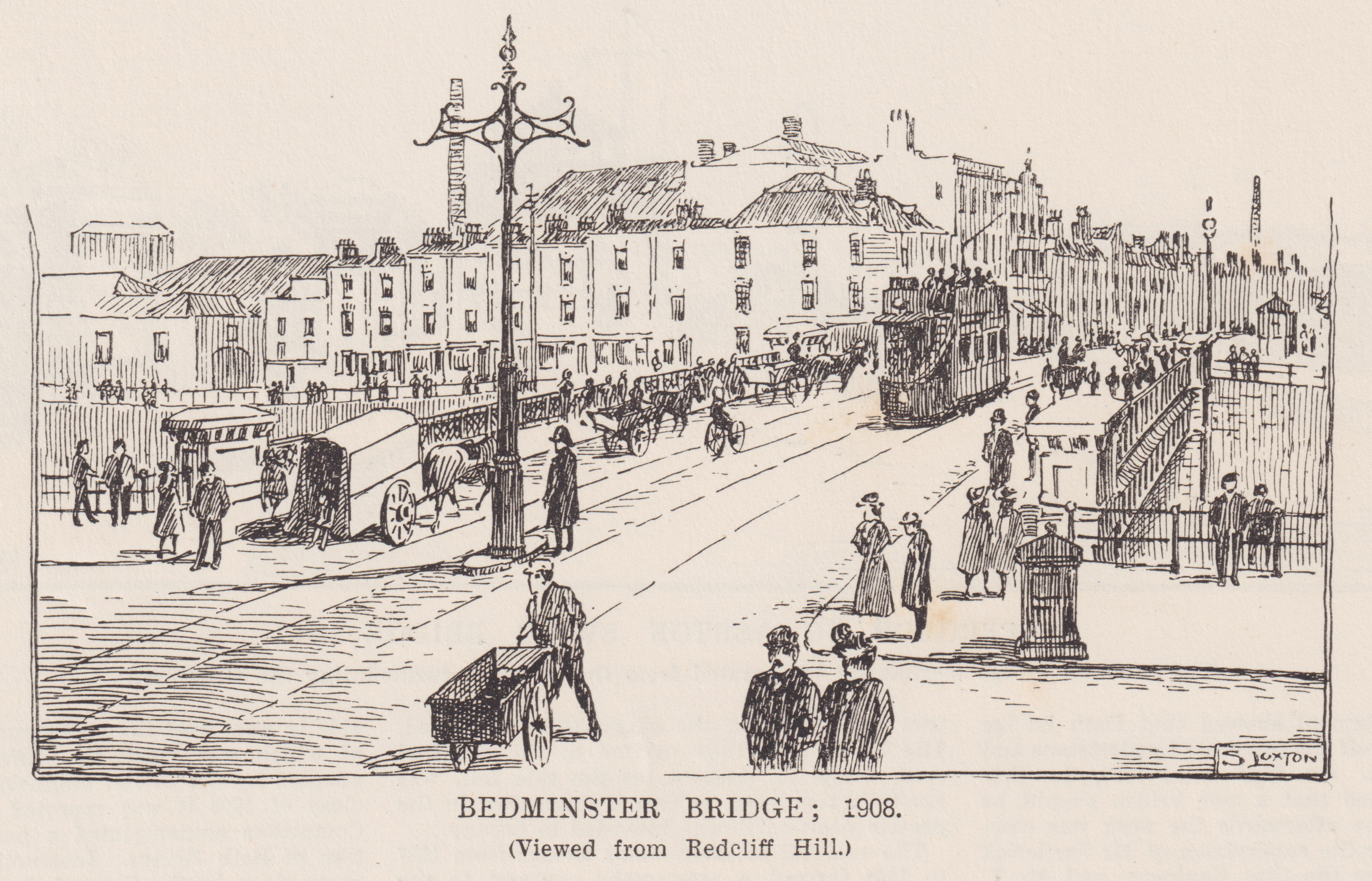
Bedminster Bridge, 1908

Bedminster Bridge is a road bridge in Bristol, England, that crosses the New Cut of the River Avon. There are actually two adjacent parallel bridges, the Bedminster Old Bridge downstream and the Bedminster New Bridge upstream, which form part of a gyratory system carrying the A38 road. The Old Bridge dates back to 1883, when it replaced the previous Harford's Bridge, and was grade II listed in 1994. The New Bridge was added in the 1960s.

The Old Bridge is built of iron and pennant stone, with a shallow, elliptical arch. The sides have an iron cross lattice with applied flower casts and vertical chain-moulded struts, and above it a balustrade of interwoven ropes beneath a heavy rope handrail. At either side are abutments, surmounted by panelled ashlar piers to the balustrades.

The original Harford's Bridge was a cast iron bridge built in 1809 at the time of the construction of the New Cut. During the demolition of Harford's Bridge and the construction of Bedminster Old Bridge, a temporary bridge was erected alongside. Once it had fulfilled its purpose, the temporary bridge was lifted off its base by two barges on a rising tide, and moved upstream to a new location, where it still exists as the Langton Street Bridge.
