= Vauxhall Bridge, Bristol =

Vauxhall Bridge
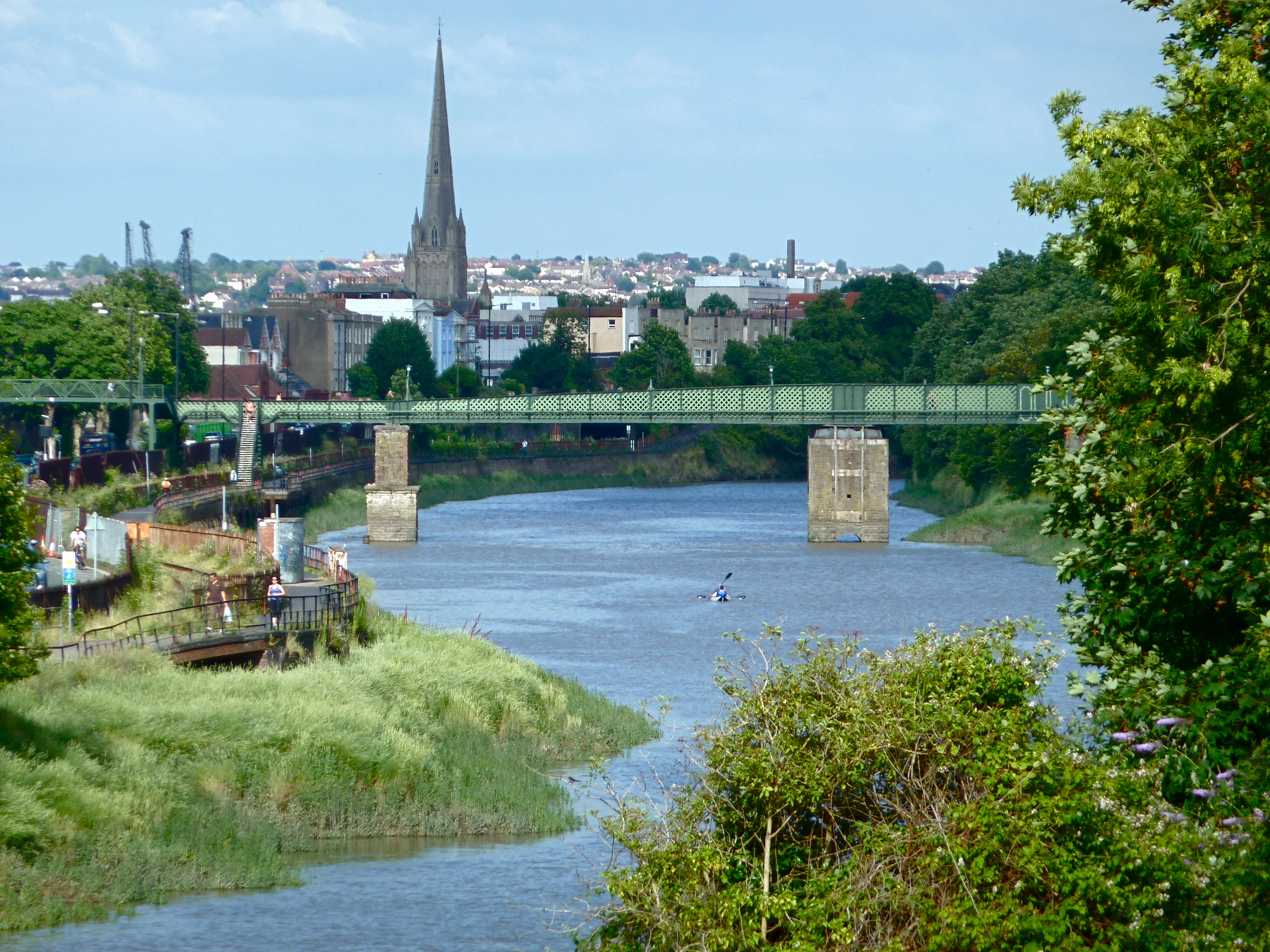
- Coordinates: 51°26′47″N 2°36′42″W
- Carries: Pedestrians and cyclists
- Crosses: New Cut of the River Avon; Bristol Harbour Railway
- Locale: Bristol
- Heritage status: Grade II listed
- Preceded by: Gaol Ferry Bridge
- Followed by: Ashton Avenue Bridge

Characteristics
- Material: Steel
- Pier construction: Stone

History
- Construction end: 1900
- Replaces: Ferry

Location
- Interactive map of Vauxhall Bridge

Vauxhall Bridge is a footbridge in Bristol, England, that crosses the New Cut of the River Avon. At its northern end, the bridge also passes over the Bristol Harbour Railway line from Ashton Gate to Wapping Wharf, which runs along the bank of the New Cut at this point. The bridge was opened in 1900, replacing the Vauxhall ferry. On 30 December 1994, it was Grade II listed. The bridge closed for repairs on 2 October 2023, and is expected to remain closed for up to two years.

When the bridge was built, the New Cut was still in use by shipping to and from Bathurst Basin and the various shipyards that adjoined the cut, and consequently the bridge was built as a swing bridge. It is approximately 270 feet (82 metres) long and 11 feet (3.4 metres) wide, with a swinging section of 158 feet (48 metres) in length. Navigation ceased on the New Cut in the 1930s, and the bridge was last swung in 1936.

== Repairs ==
As part of the New Cut bridge repairs, the bridge was closed in October 2023 for two years. Later, in 2024, it was announced that the bridge would be closed for three years as its condition was worse than expected. The repairs intend to preserve the superficial damage done to the bridge in World War II.
