= Meads Reach Bridge =

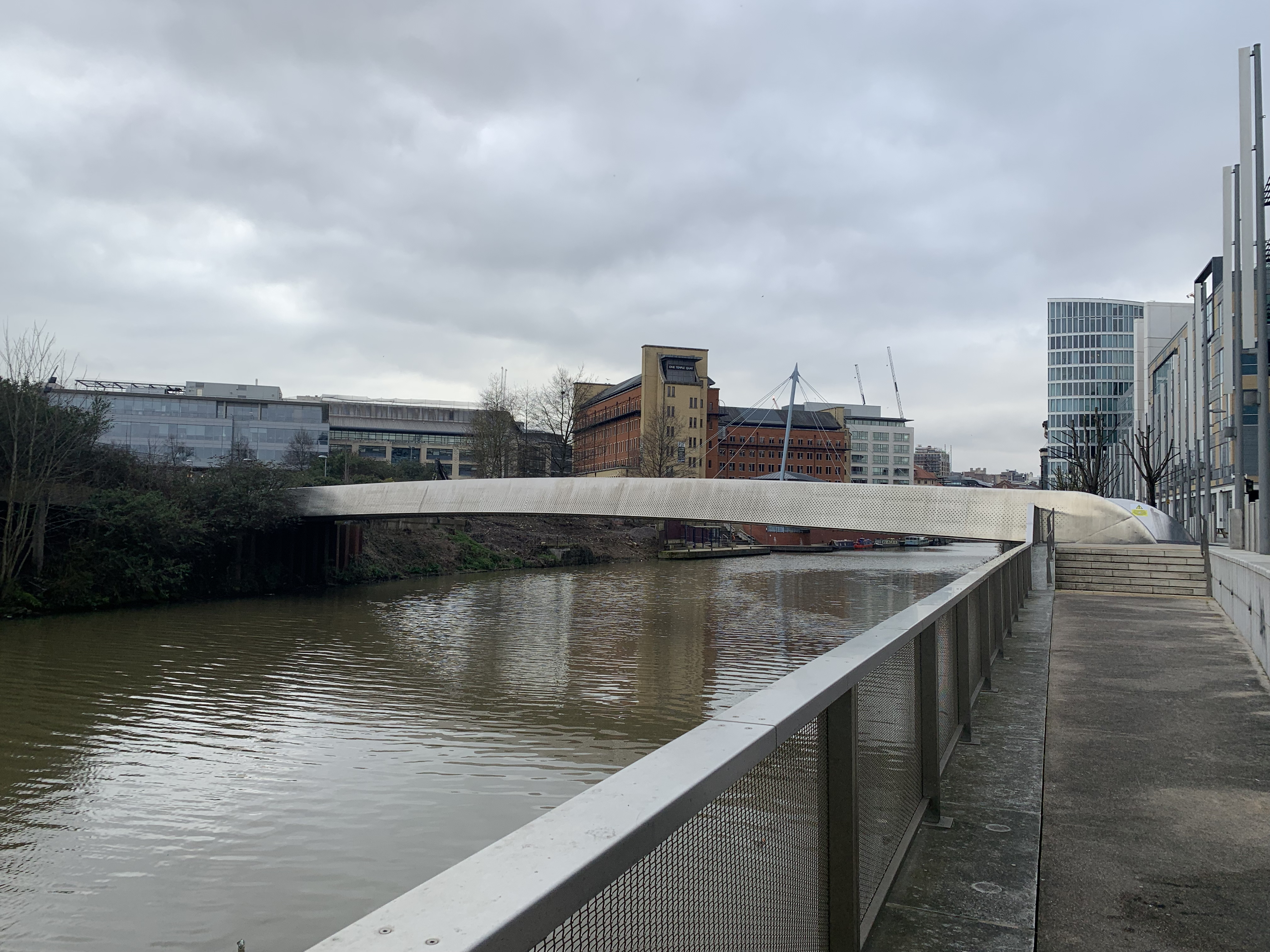
- Coordinates: 51°27′4.3″N 2°34′47.7″W
- Crosses: River Avon
- Locale: Temple Quay, Bristol

History
- Construction end: 2008
- Construction cost: £2.4 million

Location
- Interactive map of Meads Reach Bridge

Meads Reach Bridge is a footbridge in Bristol, England.

== History ==
The bridge cost £2.4 million and was opened in 2008. In 2009, it received an award from the Royal Institute of British Architects.

The surface of the bridge deck was criticised for being slippery and thus potentially dangerous to cycle across. In 2015, the surface was sprayed with an anti-slip coating.

In October 2017, the bridge was closed after a vehicle was driven onto it. Following repairs, it reopened in May 2019.

== Design ==
The bridge has a mass of 75 tonnes and a span of 55 metres (180 ft). The steel structure is covered in holes which has led to the bridge being nicknamed cheese grater.
