= Redcliffe Bridge, Bristol =

Bridge over the harbour in Bristol, England

Redcliffe Bridge
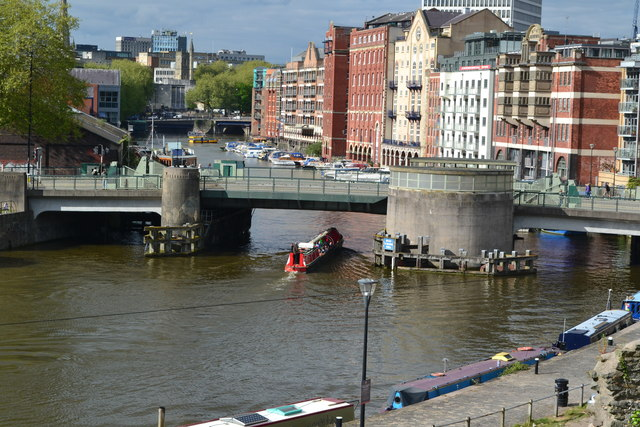
- Redcliffe Bascule Bridge
- Coordinates: 51.4495°N 2.5919°W
- Carries: Motor vehicles, pedestrians
- Crosses: Bristol Harbour
- Locale: Bristol
- Maintained by: Bristol City Council

History
- Opened: 1942

Location
- Interactive map of Redcliffe Bridge

Redcliffe Bridge is a bascule bridge over the floating harbour in Bristol, England. The bridge was built in 1938 and rebuilt in 1942 after being damaged by bombing during the Second World War.

The bridge connects The Grove and Welsh Back, on the western side of the harbour, with Redcliffe to the east. It is the furthest upstream of the opening bridges across the harbour. The next bridge upstream, Bristol Bridge, is a fixed bridge that marks the limit of navigation for any vessel unable to pass beneath its arches.

From 1882 until the building of Redcliffe Bridge, a ferry connected The Grove with Guinea Street.
