= St Philip's Marsh =

Inner suburb of Bristol, England

Coordinates: 51.4479°N 2.5666°W

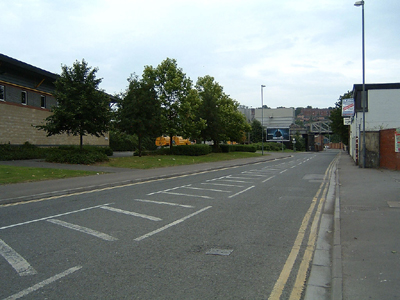
- Albert Road in St Philip's Marsh, Bristol

- Location within Bristol
- Unitary authority: Bristol
- Ceremonial county: Bristol
- Region: South West
- Country: England
- Sovereign state: United Kingdom
- Post town: Bristol
- Postcode district: BS
- Dialling code: 0117
- Police: Avon and Somerset
- Fire: Avon
- Ambulance: South Western

St Philip's Marsh is an industrial inner suburb of Bristol, England. It is bounded by River Avon and Harbour feeder canal making it an almost island area.

The site is home of Avonmeads Retail Park, a large retail and leisure park with Showcase Cinemas and a Hollywood Bowl ten-pin bowling centre among its tenants. It was extensively redeveloped in the 15 years to 2007. There is very little housing in the area making it almost deserted at night, and other than the retail area it does contain one shop, pub, takeaway and Sparke Evans Park.

A major road, St Philips Causeway, links the area to the A4 road in south east Bristol and junction 3 of the M32 motorway. It forms a prominent landmark as it is elevated over the feeder canal and railways on a viaduct that was built in the early 1990s.

== History ==
Unlike the other two areas of Bristol that are surrounded by water, it is north of the natural course of the Avon so was historically in Gloucestershire.

In past years St Philip's Marsh was a housing development for the workers of Bristol's market area (now known as Old Market).

One of St Philip's' more influential residents during the early 1900s was George Townsend, a major property developer of the South Bristol area. His family home situated in the St Anne's area of Bristol is still standing today and a reminder of Bristol's history.

St Davids Welsh Anglican Church was sited on Feeder Road until demolition in 1922. Other churches in the area include St Silas (also Feeder Road) which was damaged during the Bristol Blitz.

== Geology ==
The solid geology of St Philip's Marsh comprises Triassic Redcliffe Sandstone in the east, and Triassic mudstone and halite-stone of the Mercia Mudstone Group to the west. The solid geology is overlain by Quaternary Tidal Flat Deposits of silt and clay, which are in turn covered by deep deposits of made ground.

== Sparke Evans Park ==
Sparke Evans Park is situated on the riverside not far from the retail park. The land was donated by P. F. Sparke Evans and Jonathan Evans, local tannery owners, in 1902. It is a survivor from a time when the Marsh was a residential area. Since the area has become almost totally industrial it now gets little use, what use it does get is by workers on breaks and from the residents of Arno's Vale and Totterdown as there is a bridge linking the two areas. A shelter dating from 1925 is still extant on the far west of the park featuring wrought-iron pillars, with ornate and decorative brackets.

== Railways ==
St Philip's Marsh is close to Bristol Temple Meads railway station, on the Great Western Main Line. St Philip's Marsh depot is a train maintenance depot located within the district, owned by Network Rail and operated by Great Western Railway.

Originally developed by the Great Western Railway as a twin-turntable facility for freight locomotives, it was closed to steam in June 1964 and redeveloped as a diesel depot. From 1976 to 2023, the depot maintained InterCity 125 high speed trains. Today it maintains the diesel multiple units used on local and regional services.
