= Entrepreneurial Spark =

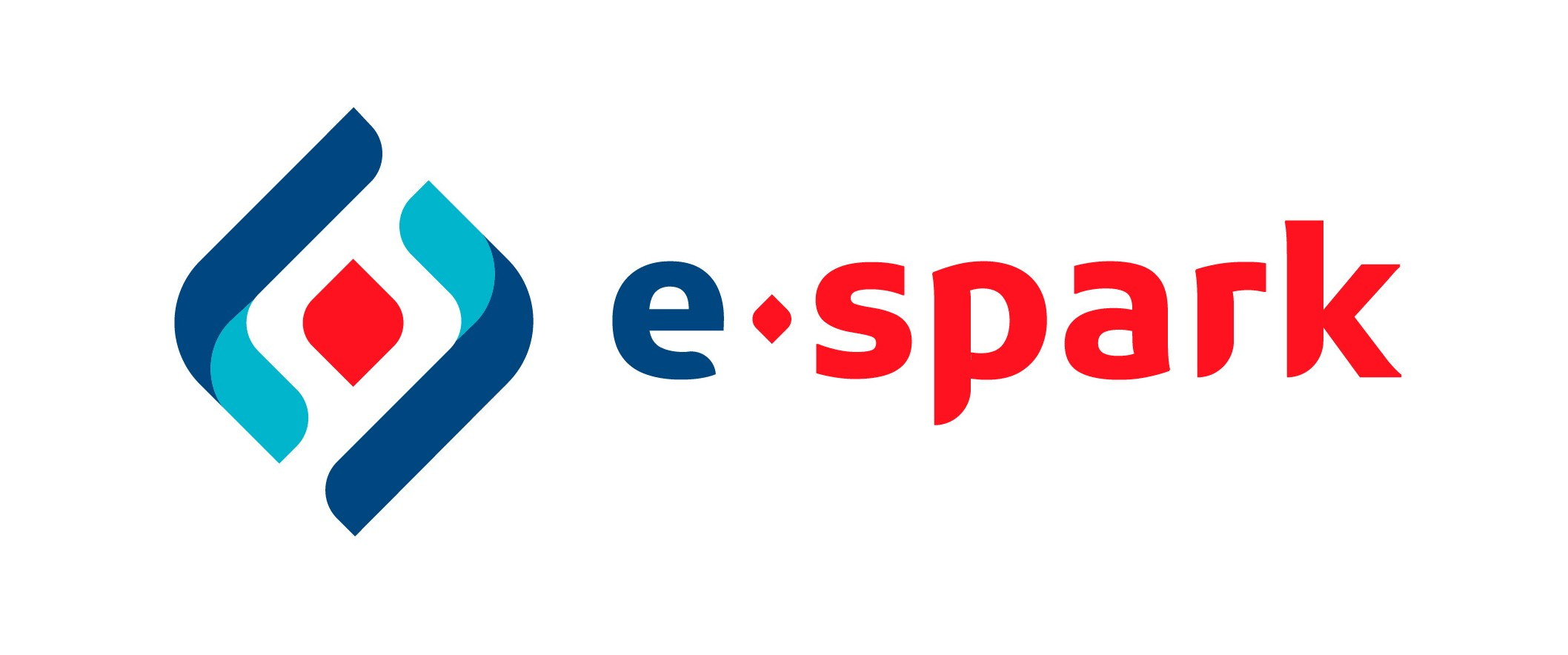

E-Spark supports business start-ups in Scotland. Founded in Glasgow, Scotland, E-Spark is funded by private capital, contributions from public sector organisations, and corporate sponsorship.

Founded in January 2012, it has accelerators originally known as 'Hatcheries' based in Scotland, in Glasgow, Ayrshire and Edinburgh; in England in Birmingham, Bristol, Brighton, Leeds, Manchester, Milton Keynes and Newcastle and in Belfast, in Northern Ireland.

Entrepreneurs were originally known as 'Chiclets' and could initially stay for up to six months, receiving support and advice from mentors and enablers. E-Spark works closely with nearby universities including Glasgow Caledonian University. In 2014 E-Spark doubled their space and facilities to provide continued support to growing businesses and their teams.

== History ==
E-spark

E-Spark was founded to support business start-ups in (and from) Scotland, through the development of entrepreneurial mindsets and behaviours. It was founded by Saltire Foundation fellow Jim Duffy and co-founder Brian McGuire, who featured the set up in the BBC Two Scotland Documentary 'The Entrepreneurs'. Businesses currently receiving support from Entrepreneurial Spark include Planitmoney, Mo's Cookie Dough, Alphabet Babies, Flexiworkforce and Raptor Equipment.

Mike Stephens is the CEO of E-Spark. He re-founded Entrepreneurial Spark and went back into startup mode in 2018 after ending the successful partnership with Natwest. Since then he has led the team in setting up another 8 accelerators across the UK and internationally, delivered over 30 cohorts and supported more than 1,500 entrepreneurs.

== Funding ==
E-Spark is a not-for-profit social enterprise supported by business leaders including Lord William Haughey, Sir Tom Hunter, and Ann Gloag OBE, local councils including Glasgow City Council, East Ayrshire Council, and South Ayrshire Council as well as gaining backing from politicians including Alex Salmond and Ed Miliband. The scheme has also secured a three-year sponsorship package with The Royal Bank of Scotland, including funds to send aspiring entrepreneurs to Babson College in the USA.

E-Spark worked with the Scottish Government to develop the £1 Million EDGE fund for entrepreneurs in Scotland.
