= Gaol Ferry Bridge =

Bridge in Bristol, England

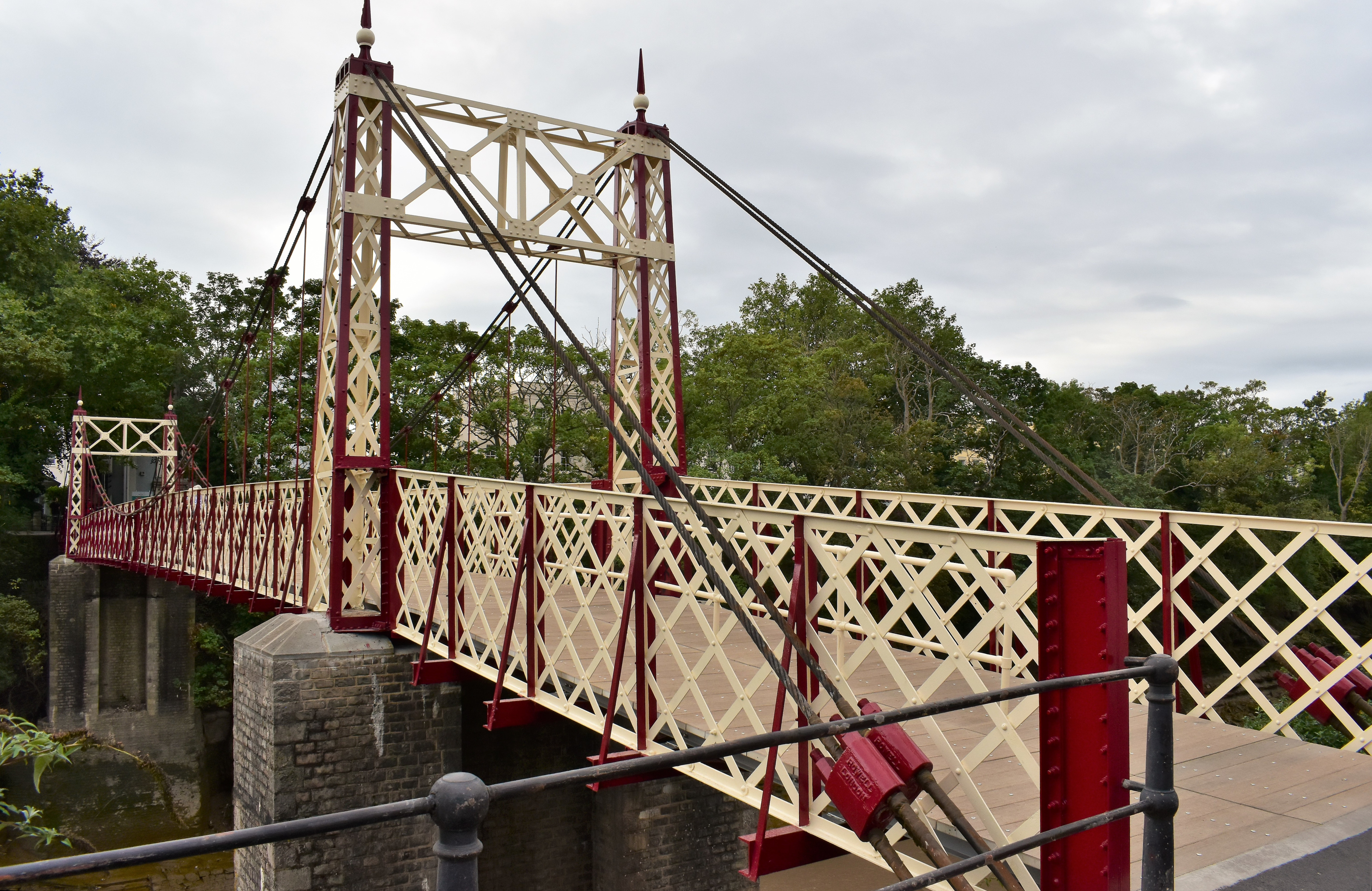
- Coordinates: 51°26′45″N 2°35′58″W
- Carries: Pedestrians and cyclists
- Crosses: New Cut of the River Avon
- Locale: Bristol
- Owner: Bristol City Council
- Preceded by: Bedminster Old Bridge
- Followed by: Vauxhall Bridge

Characteristics
- Design: Suspension
- Material: Steel
- Pier construction: Stone
- No. of spans: Single

History
- Construction end: 1935
- Replaces: Ferry

Location
- Interactive map of Gaol Ferry Bridge

Gaol Ferry Bridge is a footbridge in Bristol, England, that crosses the New Cut of the River Avon. It is an ornate steel lattice suspension bridge with timber decking, with a span of nearly 60 m (200 ft).

== History ==
The bridge opened in 1935, replacing a ferry which crossed the New Cut near the old Bristol prison, known as the New Gaol. Unlike the Vauxhall Bridge downstream, the Gaol Ferry Bridge is a fixed bridge with no provision for the navigation of vessels unable to pass under it. However, by the 1930s, there was little navigation on the New Cut, and Vauxhall Bridge was last swung in 1936.

=== Repairs ===
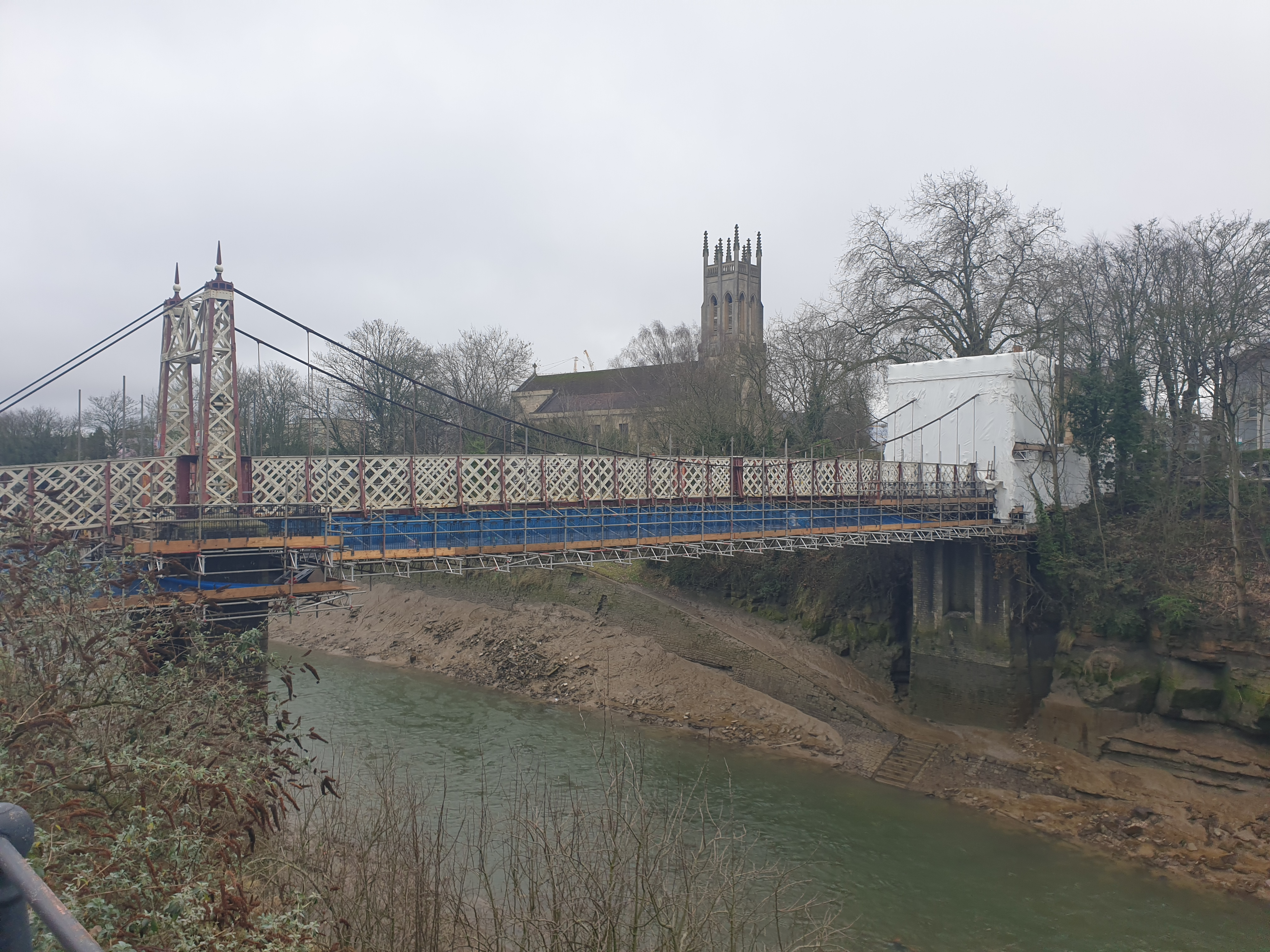
The bridge closed for repairs in 2023

Repair work began in December 2021 with the bridge remaining open. At the time, it was expected that the bridge would close in January 2022 for around three months. In August 2022 it closed for the continuing repairs, with the work expected to take between six and nine months and cost in the region of £1 million. In February 2023, the repairs were extended again, due to the bridge being in worse condition than originally thought. The bridge reopened on 8 September 2023.
