= Brock's Bridge =

Road bridge in Bristol, England

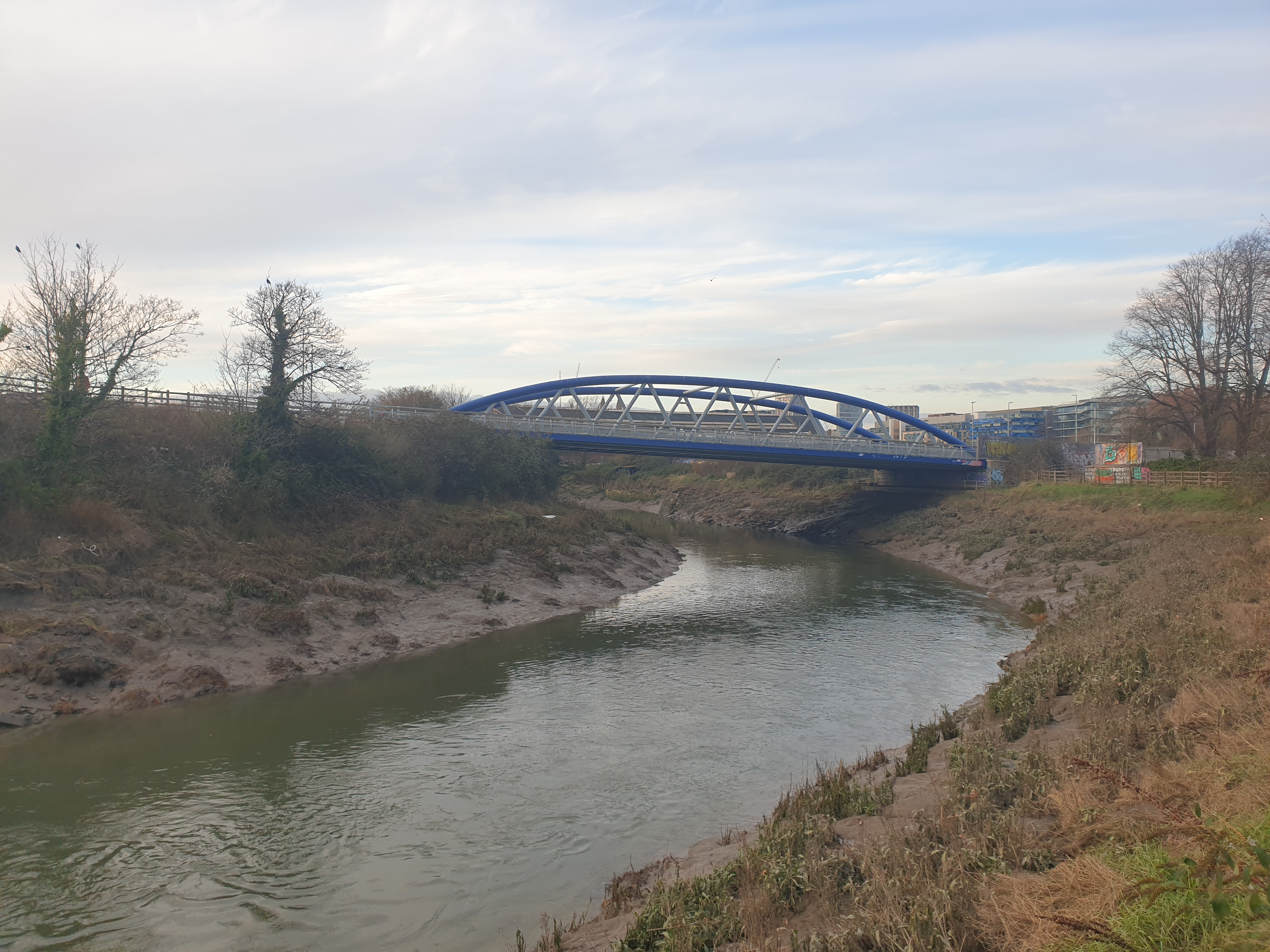
- Coordinates: 51°26′51.91″N 2°34′39.84″W
- Crosses: River Avon
- Preceded by: St Philip's Footbridge

History
- Construction end: 2016

Location
- Interactive map of Brock's Bridge

Brock's Bridge is a road bridge in Bristol, United Kingdom that crosses the River Avon. It was built to provide road access to a former railway depot that was the original planned site of the Bristol Arena.

== History ==
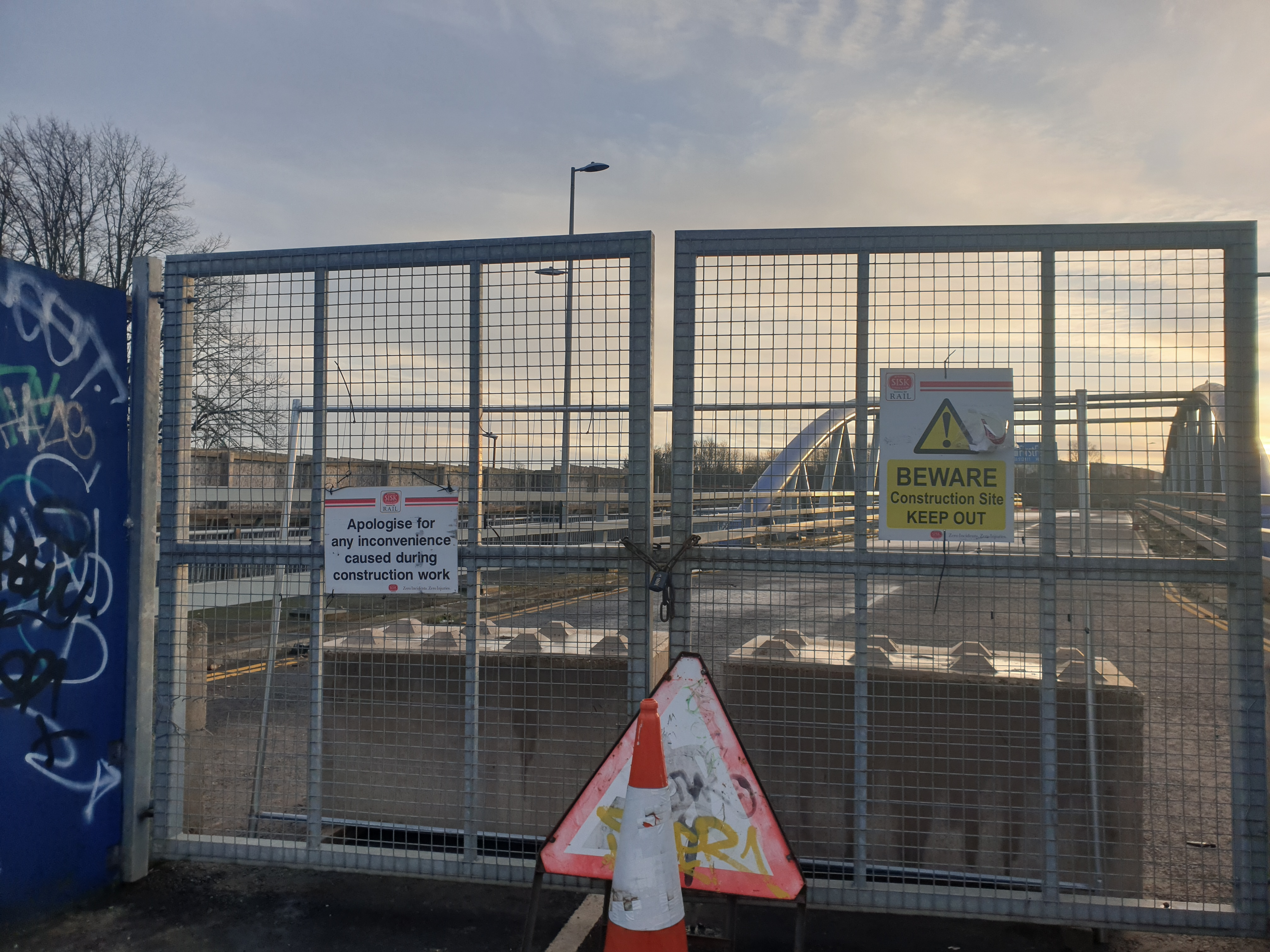
Fenced off entrance to the bridge in 2022

In March 2016, the bridge was officially named Brock's Bridge, after William Brock (1830-1907), an engineer from Totterdown. A plaque was unveiled on 16 March. However, the bridge is not yet open. In 2018 the arena plans were scrapped in favour of an arena in a former aircraft hangar at Filton Airfield. The "Arena Island" site remains under development with plans for apartments, a hotel and conference centre, but as of 2023 the bridge remained a "bridge to nowhere"

In December 2024, Legal & General, the owners of the brownfield site, now called "Temple Island", submitted new plans for the site. These include the construction of two office buildings, 500 new homes and a hotel. Plans were approved by Bristol City Council in April 2026.

== Design ==
The bridge is 63 metres (207 feet) long and 18 metres (59 feet) wide. It was assembled from site from 137 pieces of steel.
