= Bristol Development Corporation =

- Formation: 1989
- Dissolved: 1995
- Headquarters: Bristol
- Chairman: Christopher Thomas
- Chief executive: Miles Collinge

The Bristol Development Corporation was established in 1988 to develop parts of eastern Bristol, England.

== History ==
The corporation was established as part of an initiative by the future Deputy Prime Minister, Michael Heseltine, in 1988 during the Third Thatcher ministry. Board members were directly appointed by the minister and overrode local authority planning controls to spend government money on infrastructure. This was a controversial measure in Labour strongholds such as East London, Merseyside and North East England.

The formation of the corporation was delayed for 18 months as a result of a petition from Bristol City Council to the House of Lords. Its flagship developments included the Bristol Spine Road linking the M32 and the A4, which allowed developments such as the Avonmeads Retail Park and the Castle Court Retail Park to proceed. During its lifetime 1,300,000 square feet (120,000 m^{2}) of non-housing development and 676 housing units were built. Around 4,825 jobs were created and some £235m of private finance was leveraged in. Circa 180 acres (0.73 km^{2}) of derelict land was reclaimed and 4.1 miles (6.6 km) of new road and footpaths put in place.

The Chairman was Christopher Thomas and the Chief Executive was Miles Collinge. It was dissolved in 1995.
