= Trinity Road Police Station =

Police station in Bristol, England

Coordinates: 51.458°N 2.577°W

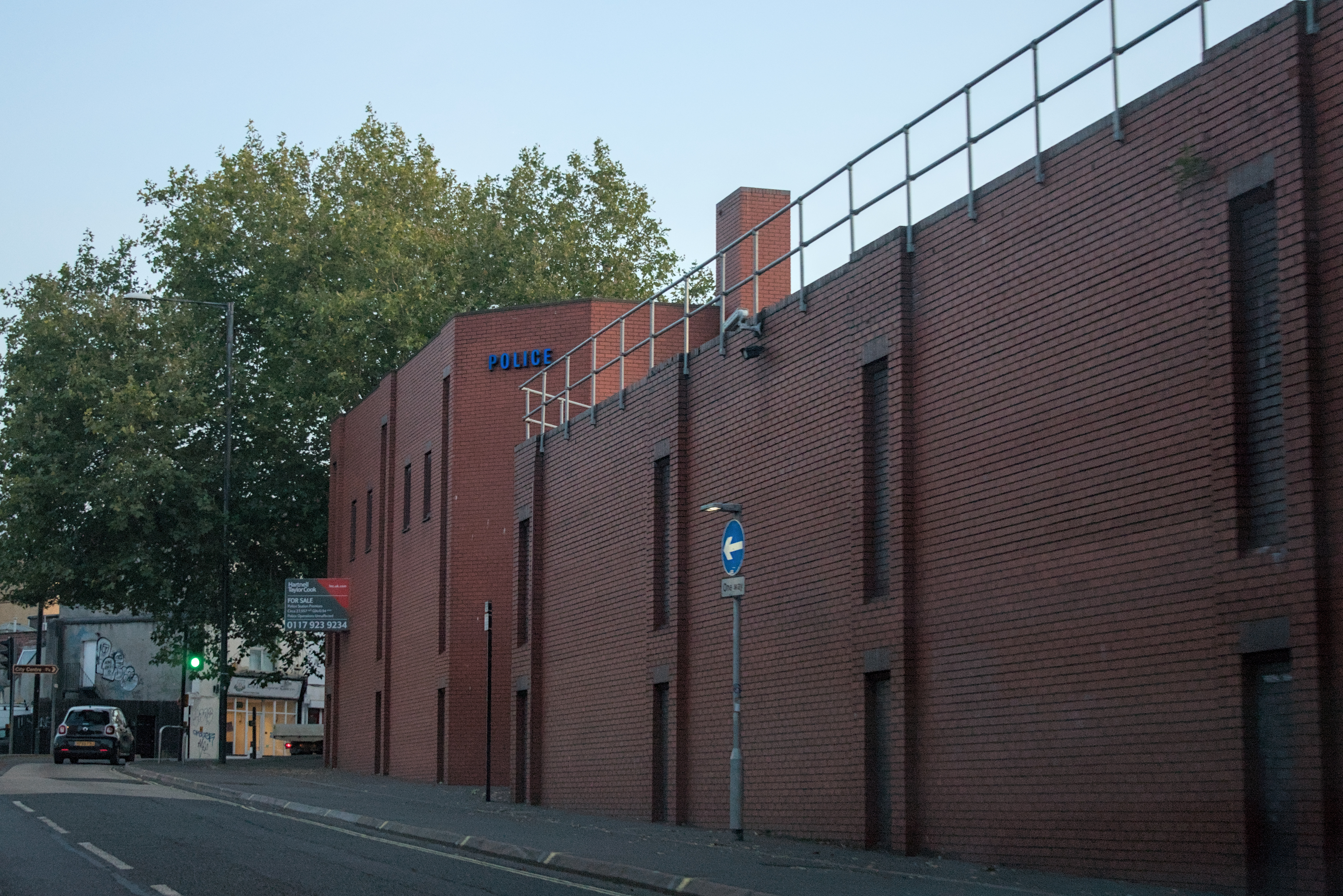

Trinity Road Police Station was the headquarters of the "Trinity Sector", or just "Trinity", of the Avon and Somerset Constabulary in Old Market area of Lawrence Hill, Bristol.

The sector was formed out of two previous sectors: Ashley Sector (St Pauls, Montpelier, Kingsdown, Cotham & Eastville) and Lawrence Hill/Easton Sector (Lawrence Hill, Easton, St Phillips, Redfield, Whitehall, Barton Hill, St Judes, Eastville & Redcliffe).

It was announced in April 2014 that the station was to be closed. In 2019 Avon and Somerset Constabulary stated they only needed 10% of its space, and intended to sell the building in 2019, but did not intend to leave the site entirely.

It was closed on 4th March 2023, and demolished in 2024 to make way for affordable housing.

== Areas covered by Trinity ==
- Barton Hill
- Easton
- Eastville
- Parts of Kingsdown
- Lawrence Hill
- Montpelier
- Redcliffe
- Redfield
- St Judes
- St Pauls
- St Phillips
- Whitehall

== See also ==
- Law enforcement in the United Kingdom
- List of law enforcement agencies in the United Kingdom
- Trinity Centre
- Trinity Road Library
