= Redfield, Bristol =

Area of Bristol, England

Coordinates: 51.45971°N 2.55653°W

Redfield
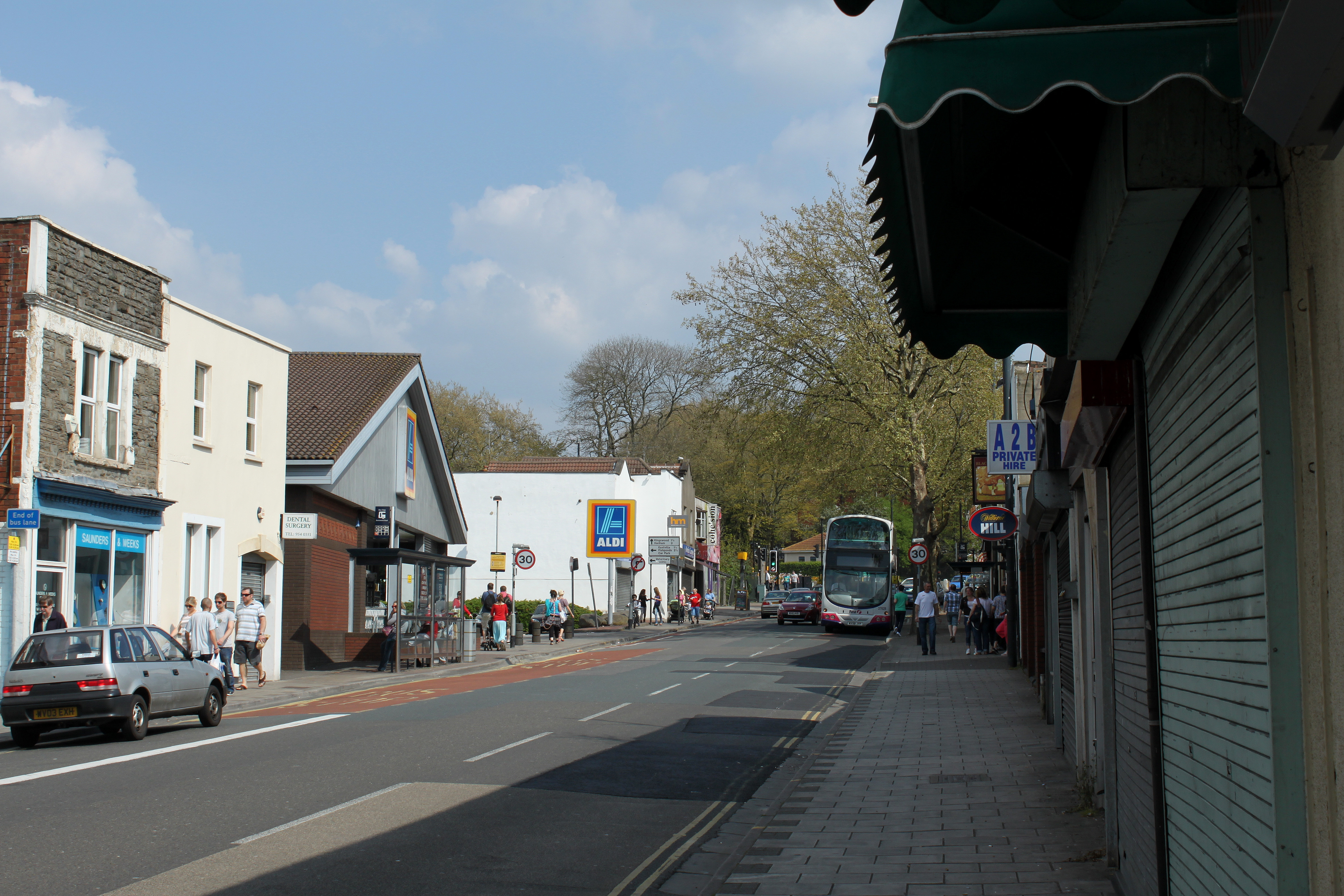
- Church Road as it passes through Redfield.

- Location within Bristol
- Population: 2,522
- Unitary authority: Bristol
- Region: South West
- Country: England
- Sovereign state: United Kingdom
- Post town: BRISTOL
- Postcode district: BS5
- Dialling code: 0117
- Police: Avon and Somerset
- Fire: Avon
- Ambulance: South Western
- UK Parliament: Bristol West

Redfield is an area situated in East Bristol though it is represented in Westminster as part of the Bristol East constituency. It includes the stretch of Church Road (A420) from Verrier Road to the western boundary of St George's Park, Victorian-era landscaped parkland. It is adjacent to the neighbourhoods of Barton Hill and Russell Town to the South, St George to the East, Whitehall to the North and Lawrence Hill to the West and Pile Marsh to the South-East.

== Population ==
The total population for the Redfield area is 2,522 and data suggests that the predominant age group is 35-49 years, consisting of 690 people. Bristol City Council identifies that the area commonly known as Redfield consists of two Lower Super Output Areas ("LSOAs"): Church Road and Redfield. The 2008 Ward Profiles published by Bristol City Council rank the two LSOAs as 112th and 111th (respectively) out of 252 most deprived areas in Bristol (no.1 being the most deprived). Redfield falls into two Bristol wards: Easton and St George West.

== Community involvement ==
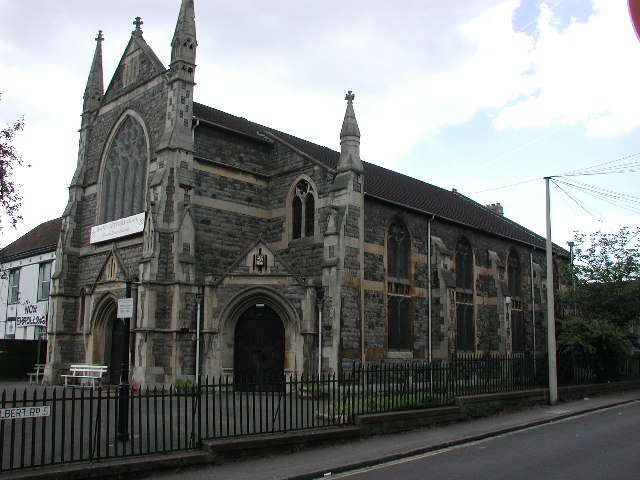
The Hindu Temple, formerly a Methodist Church in Redfield.

The 2003 Redfield Action Plan outlines a number of measures to improve social and economic conditions in Redfield and its locale. Community at Heart was set up to oversee implementation of the programme in Redfield, Barton Hill and The Dings.

== Leisure and entertainment ==
To the east of the area lies St George Park, an elegant Victorian suburban park. To the south of the area lies Netham Park.

Redfest is an independent arts and music festival seeking to bring music, film, cabaret, comedy, animation, graffiti, photography, art and fun to community of Redfield. Redfest is run by a group of volunteers from the local community and is entirely reliant on public donations, support and sponsorship from local businesses and grant funding where available.

== Transport ==
Bus routes run frequently from the area to the City Centre and out to the suburbs of Kingswood and Hanham.

The nearby Lawrence Hill railway station serves the Redfield population and provides an easy access point to other stations in Bristol including Temple meads railway station with connections across the country.

The Bristol and Bath Railway Path, a 13-mile asphalt motor-vehicle-free route between the cities of Bristol and Bath, starts just west of Redfield at Newtown in Lawrence Hill and has several entrance points along its route just north of the area.
