= St Philip and St Jacob, Bristol =

Church of St Philip and St Jacob
- St Philip and St Jacob with Emmanuel the Unity
- Central
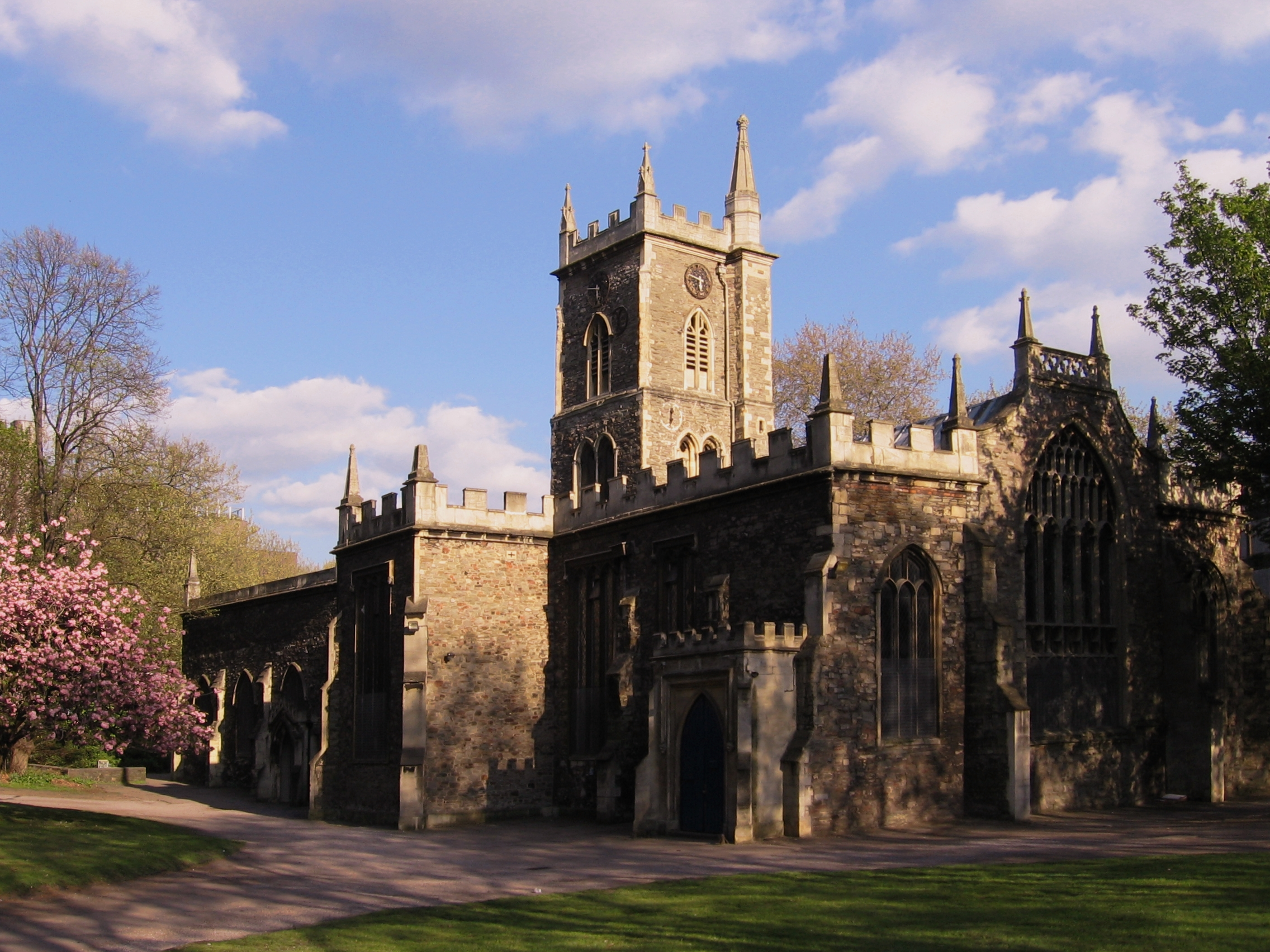

- Location within Bristol
- 51.454969°N 2.584987°W
- Location: Bristol
- Country: England
- Denomination: Church of England
- Churchmanship: Charismatic Evangelical
- Website: centralchurchbristol.org

History
- Status: Active

Architecture
- Functional status: Parish church
- Heritage designation: Grade II* listed
- Designated: 8 January 1959
- Architect: Robert, 1st Earl of Gloucester
- Architectural type: Early English, Perpendicular
- Groundbreaking: Circa 900AD
- Completed: Before 1174

Administration
- Diocese: Diocese of Bristol
- Archdeaconry: Archdeaconry of Bristol
- Deanery: City
- Parish: St Philip and St Jacob with Emmanuel Bristol

Clergy
- Vicar: The Revd Tim Jones

SS Philip and Jacob Church, (grid reference ST594730) informally referred to as Pip 'n' Jay, is a parish church in central Bristol, England. The church that meets there is now called Central Church, Bristol. Its full name since 1934 is St Philip and St Jacob with Emmanuel the Unity, although reference to the original church of St Philip exists in records dating from 1174. Historically the 'Mother church of East Bristol', it serves the area known as The Dings.

== The building ==
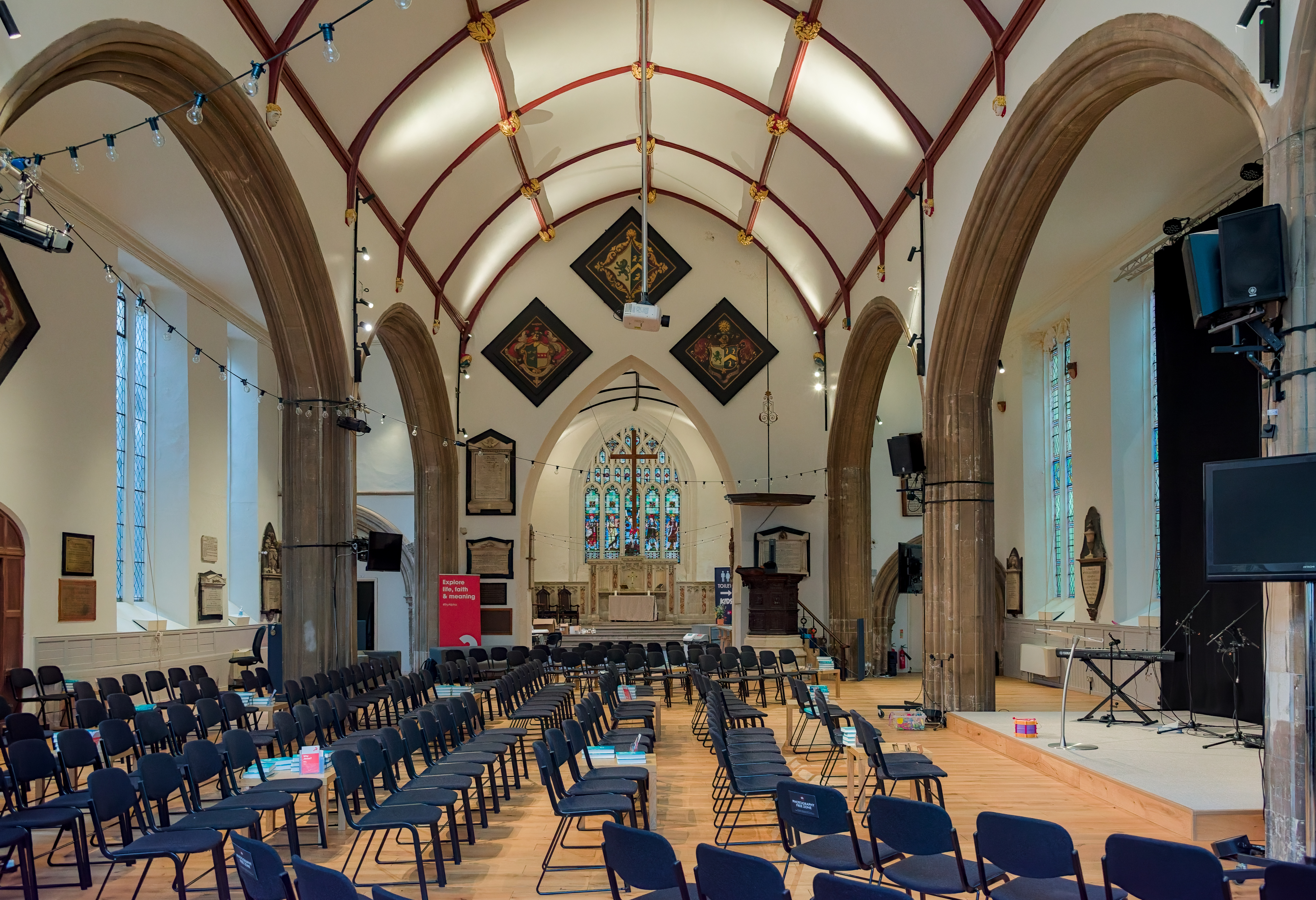
Interior of the church, with pews since removed to allow for larger congregation

St Philip and St Jacob refers to itself as the city's 'oldest place of Christian worship'. The church began as a small priory around AD 900. It was later rebuilt by Robert, 1st Earl of Gloucester, who also built the nearby priory of St James'. All that remains of the original church is the font, although parts of the chancel and tower date from at least the 13th Century. The building was extended during the Middle Ages to include the present-day nave, the pillars of which are actually Victorian additions, possibly by William Armstrong.

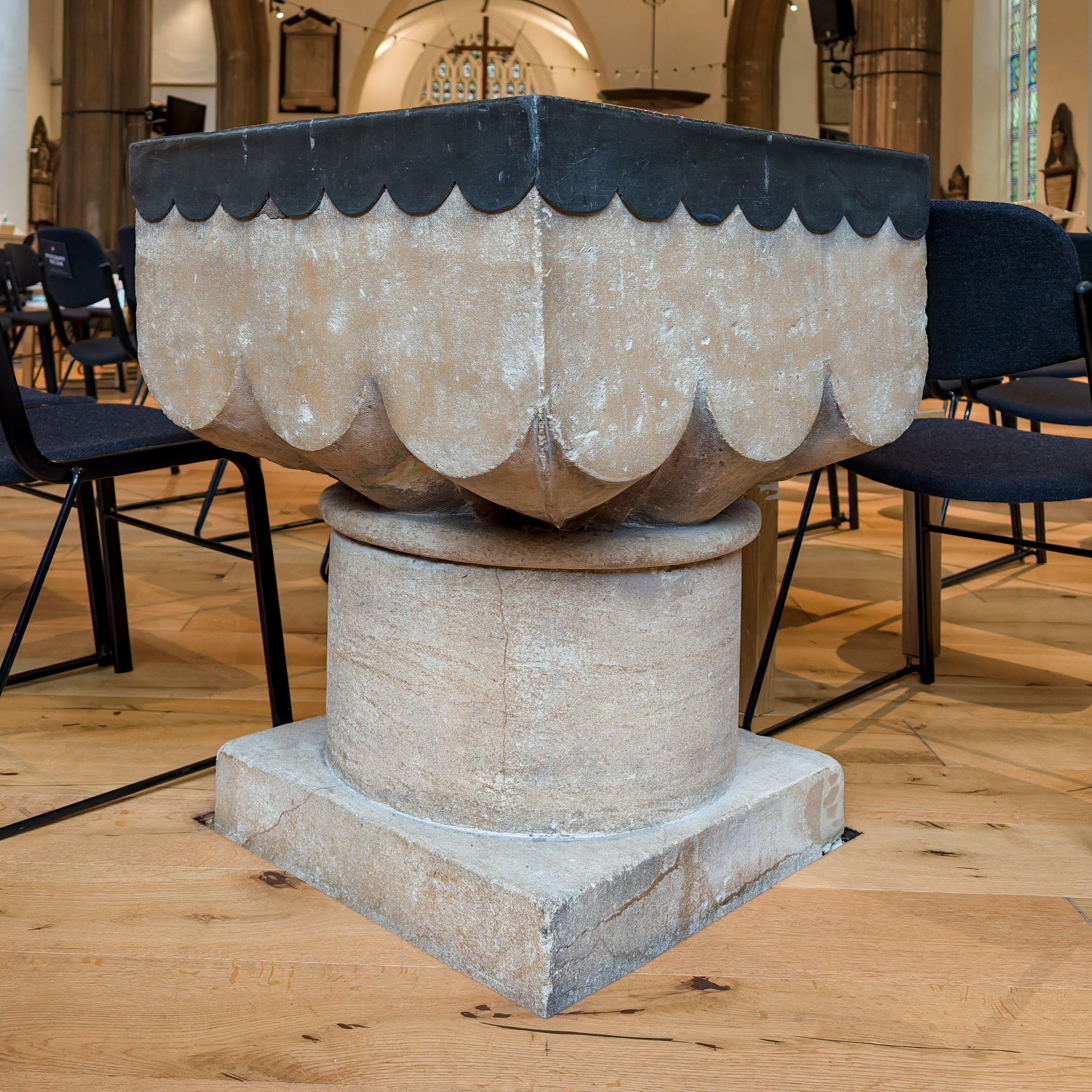
Norman square baptismal font, now located in the nave, with scalloped basin characteristic of Norman (11th–12th century) fonts.

The tower contains eight bells dating from 1738 and made by William Bilbie of the Bilbie family.

Around 1860 new plans were submitted by John Bindon, Richard Shackleton Pope and Thomas Shackleton Pope and accepted for the rebuilding of the church.

An extension was also added to the south-east corner of the church during the 1980s, comprising meeting rooms, a kitchen and other facilities. The building is an English Heritage Grade II* listed structure.

=== Church monuments ===
The church once retained the upper half of a late-medieval recumbent knightly effigy, dating from about 1470–75, which was the surviving fragment of a once complete monument described as having been among the largest monumental effigies in England. The fragment depicted a man-at-arms wearing a tall sallet with a pointed skull, in which the point was formed in profile by the convergence of two steep arcs running from the front and back along the comb, and the skull was narrow laterally. Tobias Capwell notes that this monument is only one of two representing this sallet morphology in England, the other being at Ripon Cathedral. The effigy was recorded in the 19th century as being long identified in local tradition as representing “Robert, son of William the Conqueror", although the same account observes that the armour was of a period about 200 years later, and therefore anachronistic to that identification. The effigy was presumably lost or destroyed sometime after it was last recorded in 1982.

== Archives ==
Parish records for St Philip & St Jacob church, Bristol are held at Bristol Archives (Ref. P. St P&J) (online catalogue) including baptism, marriage and burial registers. The archive also includes records of the incumbent, churchwardens, overseer of the poor, parochial church council, charities, schools and vestry plus photographs, deeds, pictures, maps and plans.

== Closure threats ==
During the English Civil War the demolition of the church was ordered (along with nearby St Peter's) to prevent its use as a fortress for attacking the city of Bristol. However, reinforcements arriving in the city meant that the building was saved.

In the early 1960s, the church was again threatened with closure, but managed to avoid this due to the determination of its then-small congregation, who adopted both the motto 'Seek First' (from Matthew Chapter 6, verse 33) and, uniquely, the nickname 'Pip 'n' Jay'.

== The church today ==
Since 1963, St Philip and St Jacob has become one of the leading Evangelical churches in Bristol. In the 1970s it was part of the Charismatic revival in the Church of England. Its vicar was the Revd Canon Malcolm Widdecombe (1937-2010, brother of Conservative MP Ann Widdecombe) from 1974 until his retirement in 2009. He died of metastatic oesophageal cancer on 12 October 2010. His son, the Revd Roger Widdecombe, is an Anglican priest. Today, the church supports and sends out many missionaries.

The church changed its name in 2018 to Central and currently is led by the Revd Tim Jones who was appointed Vicar in 2023.

== The parish ==
St Philip and St Jacob is one of the original parishes of Bristol. It includes the Old Market area, and extended beyond the original city boundaries to include what are now the Bristol districts of Baptist Mills, Barton Hill, Lawrence Hill, Newtown, Russell Town, St Jude's, St Philips Marsh, The Dings and part of Easton. A growing population in the 19th century led to the building of ten new churches in the east of the parish, seven of which have now closed. In 1871 Greenbank Cemetery was opened as a burial place for the whole parish.

The ancient parish lay within the hundred of Barton Regis.

== List of incumbents ==
The following is a list of rectors and vicars of St Philip and St Jacob, partly based on records compiled by the Rev. M. E. Thorold. The church was originally served by rectors until 1394, when the first vicar was appointed. The title of rector was resumed in 1877 after the tithes were purchased from the lay impropriators.

| Year | Name | Office | Notes |
|---|---|---|---|
| 1275 | Richard Hammond de Newynton | Rector | |
| 1290 | Robert Anketul | Rector | |
| 1328 | Ralph de Wymborne | Rector | |
| 1331 | Walter de Caerwent | Rector | |
| 1340 | Walter Freeman | Rector | Allotted annual rent to maintain the lights of St Catherine |
| 1346 | Richard le Small | Rector | |
| 1348 | John de Wydcombe | Rector | Shared office with Nicholas de Usk |
| 1348 | Nicholas de Usk | Rector | Shared office with John de Wydcombe |
| 1349 | Nicholas de Fisherton | Rector | |
| 1351 | William Sandevere | Rector | |
| 1394 | Hugh Hope | Vicar | The first vicar of the parish |
| 1400 | John White | Vicar | |
| 1420 | Philip Fulgare | Vicar | |
| 1421 | Stephen Graunger | Vicar | |
| 1422 | John Heaneman | Vicar | |
| 1422 | John Faurthermore | Vicar | |
| 1435 | John Lawrence | Vicar | |
| 1471 | Richard Chylde | Vicar | |
| 1475 | Lodowic Williams | Vicar | |
| 1481 | Mile Terre | Vicar | |
| 1493 | Robert Browne | Vicar | |
| 1504 | Thomas Strange | Vicar | |
| 1505 | Thomas Botiller | Vicar | |
| 1511 | William Burgill | Vicar | |
| 1513 | John Gardiner | Vicar | |
| 1526 | John Collis | Vicar | |
| 1545 | Nicholas Corbet | Vicar | |
| 1545 | David Conden | Vicar | |
| 1562 | Thomas Colman | Vicar | Held the position for 41 years; once imprisoned in Newgate |
| 1604 | William Yeoman | Vicar | Appointed prebendary of Bristol Cathedral in 1622 |
| 1633 | John Pearce | Vicar | Deprived of his living (removed from office) by Parliament in 1645 |
| 1646 | Mr. Stubbs | Minister | Appointed during the Interregnum |
| 1649 | Henry Hazzard | Minister | Paid at the rate of 10 shillings a sermon |
| 1651 | Mr. Jerrum | Minister | Approved to preach twice every Sunday |
| 1656 | Mr. Stevenson | Minister | |
| 1659 | Mr. Handcocke | Minister | Withdrew in 1662 following the Act of Uniformity |
| 1663 | Thomas Godwyn | Vicar | |
| 1675 | Thomas Cary | Vicar | Also held the living of All Saints |
| 1712 | Joseph Taylor | Vicar | |
| 1723 | William Cary | Vicar | Son of Thomas Cary; later Chancellor of the Diocese |
| 1759 | Carew Reynell | Vicar | Resigned to become vicar of St James' |
| 1770 | James New | Vicar | |
| 1810 | William Day | Vicar | |
| 1832 | Samuel Emery Day | Vicar | The last vicar appointed by the Bristol Corporation |
| 1864 | James William Lyon Bowley | Vicar | First appointed by the Bristol Trustees |
| 1871 | Thomas Graham | Vicar | |
| 1877 | George Burder James | Rector | Resumed the title of rector |
| 1900 | John Oliver West | Rector | |
| 1909 | Michael Edward Thorold | Rector | Former vicar of All Saints', Darlaston |
| 1935 | G. J. Jarvis | Vicar | Later vicar of All Saint's Church, Harpole |
| 1945 | Kenneth H. Hooker | Vicar | Former vicar of St Matthew's, Fulham, left for St Paul's, Cambridge |
| 1948 | T. P. Tindall | Vicar | Former vicar of St Gabriel's, Easton, retired due to health reasons |
| 1956 | William H. Frost | Vicar | Former vicar of St Oswald's, Collyhurst, left in 1959 for St Edyth's, Sea Mills |
| 1974 | Malcolm Widdecombe | Vicar | Inducted on 2 May 1974; the church had been without a vicar since 1959 and was under threat of redundancy until his appointment. Retired in 2009. |
| 2011 | Tim Silk | Priest-in-charge | Previously associate curate at Kill O' The Grange Parish Church (Church of Ireland). Installed by the Bishop of Swindon. |
| 2023 | Tim Jones | Vicar | |

== See also ==
- Grade II* listed buildings in Bristol
- Churches in Bristol
