= Newtown, Bristol =

Neighbourhood of Bristol, England

Coordinates: 51.457°N 2.573°W

Newtown
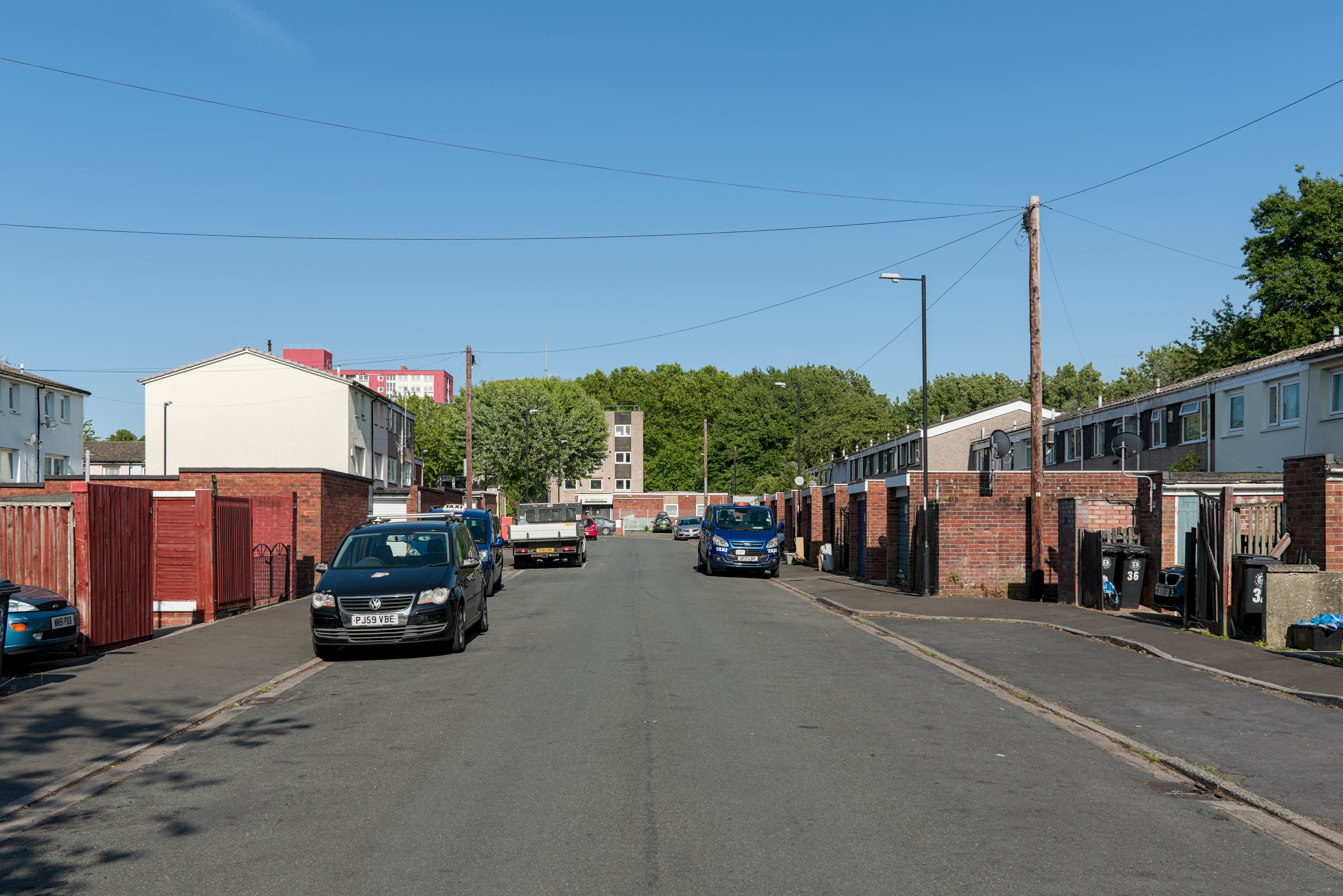
- A view of Hassell Drive in Newtown, facing east

- Location within Bristol
- Unitary authority: Bristol
- Ceremonial county: Bristol
- Region: South West
- Country: England
- Sovereign state: United Kingdom
- Post town: BRISTOL
- Postcode district: BS2
- Dialling code: 0117
- Police: Avon and Somerset
- Fire: Avon
- Ambulance: South Western
- UK Parliament: Bristol East

Newtown is a neighbourhood within the Lawrence Hill ward of the city of Bristol, England, and is adjacent to Old Market and The Dings. It is bounded by the Bristol & Bath Railway Path to the south, the A420 (Lawrence Hill) to the north, Trinity Road to the west, and St Philip's Causeway and Barton Hill to the east. The current community was rebuilt following the construction of the Outer Circuit Road in Easton, with very little remaining from the pre-war landscape.

== History ==
=== Pre-war community (1838–1945) ===
Until the 1830s the site was glebe attached to the rectory of St Philip & Jacob. The arrival of the Great Western Railway in 1838 and the Great Western Cotton Factory in 1839 triggered speculative building in the Barton Hill area; by 1860 a tight grid of terraces housed the families and workers in local industries. Local social life revolved around a cluster of small beerhouses, including the Freemasons Arms, Engineers Tavern, and the Millwrights Arms on Barrow Road, the Foresters Arms on Clarence Street and the Dove Inn on Trinity Street, all established by the early 20th century. In 1855, the United Methodist Free Church established a chapel within its Bristol circuit on Trinity Road. Wesley Hall, a Wesleyan chapel dating from 1888 on the corner of Barrow Road and Morley Terrace, hosted a thriving Boys' and Girls' Brigade and organised annual coach outings to Weston-super-Mare in the 1950s. During World War II local children staged an improvised variety show behind the air-raid shelters at Clarence Place.

=== The Newtown Estate (1952–present) ===
Newtown was the first district earmarked in Bristol's 1952 Development Plan for total demolition, despite the region largely avoiding the Bristol Blitz. Victorian courts west of Barrow Road disappeared in phases (1953–70); many residents were rehoused in tower blocks such as Barton House. Bristol Corporation used a wrecking ball demolition method, flattening whole rows such as Regent Terrace during 1967–69. In January 1966, the council housebuilding program for 1967 included a scheme for 300 homes at Newtown, as part of a citywide project consisting of 2000 new units. In July 1970, the city council made the City and County of Bristol (Newtown Area) Compulsory Purchase Order 1970 to acquire properties on Clarence Road, Trinity Place, and Kenilworth Terrace for the provision of new housing for the future estate. The order was confirmed by the Minister of Housing and Local Government on 4 November 1970. Seeking a low-rise development, the city laid out the Newtown Estate in the Radburn design, opening in 1971. The period also brought major road construction in the immediate vicinity, including Lawrence Hill roundabout and St Philip's Causeway in 1973, erasing shops and pubs on Lawrence Hill and cutting pedestrian links to Old Market as part of the Outer Circuit Road scheme. The Midland Railway locomotive shed on Barrow Road, opened in 1873 for St Philip's railway station, was closed in 1965 and was demolished two years later. The former trackbed now forms part of the Bristol and Bath Railway Path.

In 1988 the city council funded construction of 131 new porches on the Newtown Estate at a reported cost of £181,000, attracting debate in the council chamber over the appropriate standard and cost of external improvements to the housing stock, particularly from Conservative councilors.

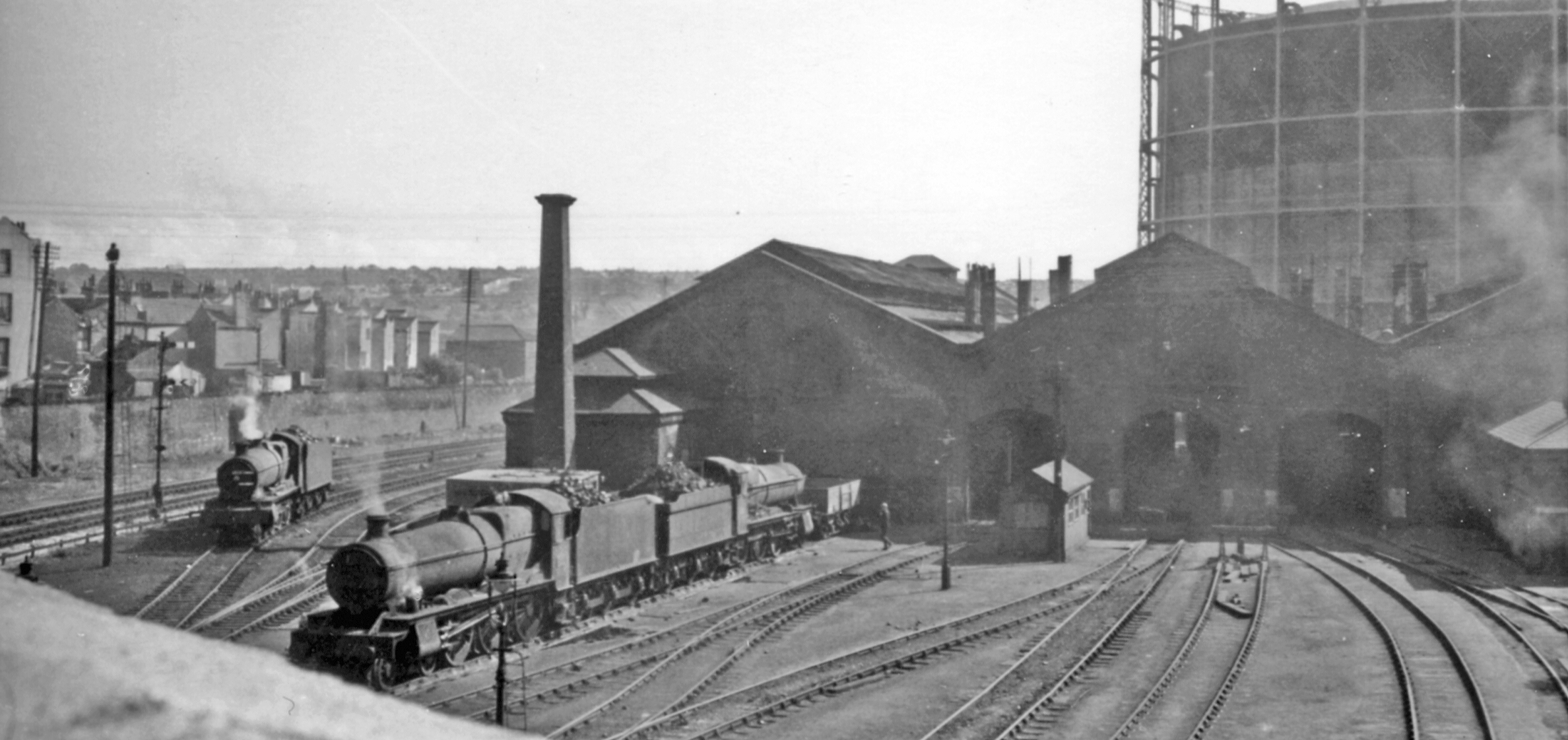
The Barrow Road Depot in its last days, 1965.

Post-industrial population losses were offset by immigrant families arriving from Somalia, Poland and elsewhere. In 2024, Newtown Park was refurbished and reopened with a new children's playground.

Local community group Newtown Network campaigned for the installation of additional street lighting in the area amid safety fears following the fatal stabbing of a 19-year-old male on Hayes Close in October 2021. In May 2025 a 20-year-old male was attacked and stabbed by three men on bicycles in Newtown Park.

== Community ==
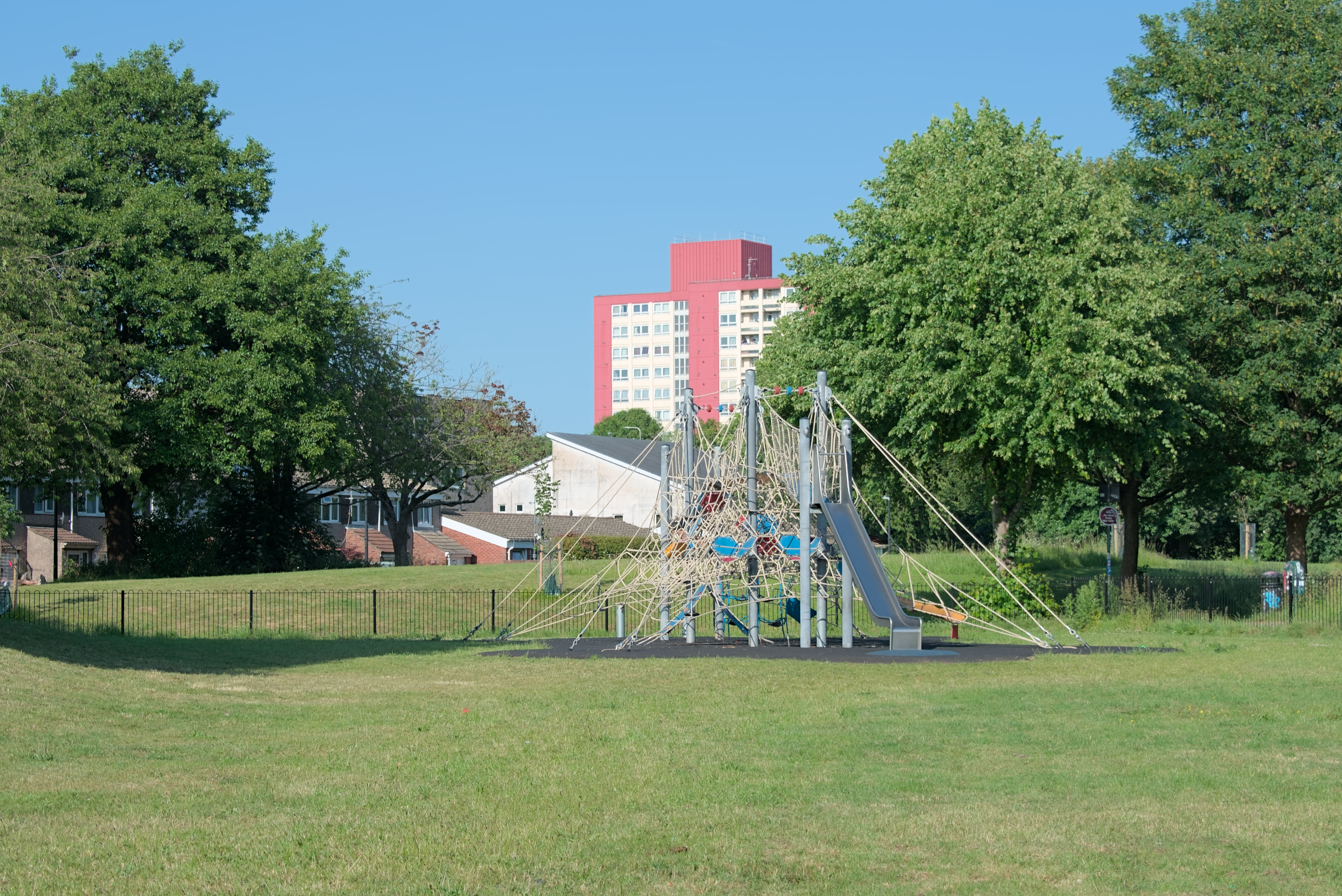
Newtown Park includes a variety of equipment for children to play with. In the distance, tower blocks in Lawrence Hill can be seen.

Newtown is part of the Lawrence Hill ward, which lies within the Bristol East parliamentary constituency. It is locally represented in the Ashley, Easton and Lawrence Hill Neighbourhood Partnership operated by Bristol City Council. Community development support is provided by Eastside Community Trust, which also runs Easton Community Centre and Felix Road Adventure Playground. Grass-roots organisations such as the Newtown Network and Newtown Nature Club promote environmental projects in the community.

== Infrastructure and amenities ==
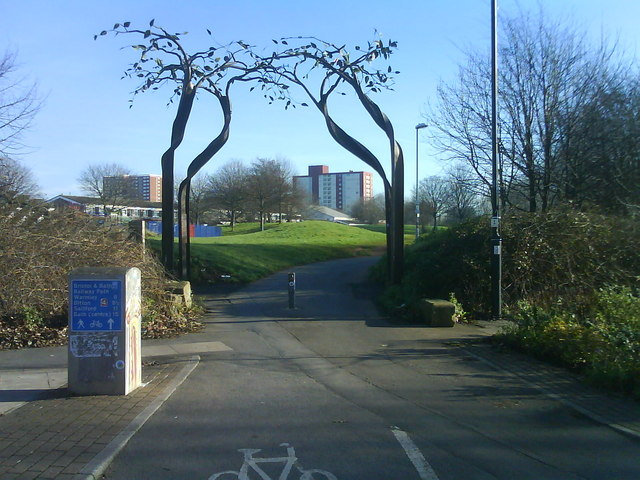
The Bristol & Bath Railway Path bisects Newtown Park.

Newtown can only be entered by road from the east at the junction of Hassell Drive and St Philip's Causeway, while Lawrence Hill railway station lies about ten minutes away on foot. At the west, Hayes Close and Trinity Street used to form an intersection but this has since been turned into a cul-de-sac only accessible for pedestrians. Alternatively, various footpaths run between the various green areas and terraces, providing a wide range of access on foot.

The principal public open space is Newtown Park, which offers a fenced playground, multi-use games area and community food beds. A 2019 UWE Bristol design workshop set out options for richer biodiversity planting and upgraded play equipment. The park is bisected by the Bristol & Bath Railway Path. A 2020 study by Sustrans suggested a widening the path through Newtown Park, adding cycle–pedestrian segregation and creating ramps at Trinity Street.

The Trinity Tabernacle Hall (Assemblies of God) and the Salvation Army Easton citadel opposite both host weekly activities, while the residents' common-room in Rosevear House is used for meetings, craft sessions and after-school clubs. Trinity Tabernacle was first licensed for marriages at 109–111 Lawrence Hill in 1957; following clearance for Easton Way, a new hall opened on Hassell Drive in 1974. The Lawrence Hill Health Centre is also within the neighbourhood, having opened in 1977 on the site of a former doctors' office. The health centre contains a pharmacy and offers community outreach through the NHS "Forest" gardening programme.

== Bibliography ==
- Stephenson, David; Jones, Andy; Cheesley, David; Haste, Ernie (1 June 2002). Old Market, Newtown, Lawrence Hill and Moorfields. Tempus Pub Limited. ISBN 978-0-7524-2618-1.
