= George Daniel Jones =

British gas worker, swimming coach, and George Medal recipient (1900–1969)

George Daniel Jones GM
- Born: 1900
- Died: 24 February 1969 (aged 68–69); Bristol, England
- Occupations: Gas company worker, school welfare officer, swimming coach, sports journalist
- Known for: Founding Bristol Central Swimming Club and removing incendiary bombs from a gas holder during the Bristol Blitz
- Spouse: Lily Jones
- Children: 3
- Awards: George Medal
- Military career
- Allegiance: United Kingdom
- Branch: British Army
- Unit: 15th Hampshire Regiment
- Conflicts: World War I

George Daniel Jones GM (1900 – 24 February 1969) was a Bristol gas worker, swimming organiser, coach, and school welfare officer. He was awarded the George Medal for gallantry after climbing a gas holder during the Bristol Blitz in November 1940 and removing incendiary bombs that threatened a large industrial and residential area, primarily The Dings, St Philip's, and Barton Hill. Alongside his wartime bravery, he was a prominent figure in Bristol swimming in the mid-20th century, founding Bristol Central Swimming Club and serving the club for decades as its secretary, treasurer, and coach.

== Early life ==
Jones was born in 1900. He grew up in Bristol and became involved in swimming through Broad Plain Lads' Club, which offered swimming alongside football, cricket, and tennis.

Still under age, he served in the British Army during World War I, and later accounts place his service in France and Germany as part of the 15th Hampshire Regiment during the British occupation of the Rhineland after the Armistice. After the war he returned to Bristol and resumed civilian life.

== Career ==
Jones worked for the Bristol Gas Company for about 20 years. The Bristol Gas Company was one of the city's major employers, and its Avon Street works at St Philip's formed part of the network of gasworks that supplied fuel and lighting to Bristol homes, streets, and industries across the 19th and 20th centuries. By the interwar years he and his wife Lily were living at 24 Folly Lane, St Philip's, in company housing beside the large gas holder later associated with the act for which he received the George Medal. After leaving the gas company he became a school welfare officer, or school attendance officer, with Bristol Education Committee, a post he held until his retirement in the mid-1960s. He was also active in youth work in the St Philip's and Dings districts, where he helped train Boys' Brigade bandsmen and coached local boys in swimming and other sports.

Sport ran alongside his working life. In his younger years he played association football as an amateur for St Philip's Adult School and the Union Jacks, and later appeared for both Bristol City and Bristol Rovers. He also had trials for Chelsea and won a county cap for Gloucestershire in 1927 and 1928.

Swimming, however, became the chief focus of his public life. After returning to his old club after the war, he took on the roles of captain and secretary in 1924, and remained in office until the club came to an end in 1936. On 1 January 1937, Jones and others established Bristol Central Swimming Club, with Jones serving from the beginning as secretary, treasurer, and coach. Under his long stewardship, Bristol Central developed into one of the leading swimming clubs in the west of England.

Jones also became a familiar journalistic voice in local sports features. For about 15 years he served as swimming correspondent for the Bristol Evening Post and its sports paper, the Green 'Un, ultimately retiring from the role in 1967. His influence extended beyond club administration. In 1948 he was appointed one of Britain's Olympic coaches and regional talent scouts, and he was appointed again in 1952. Among the swimmers associated with him and Bristol Central were Ray Legg, Stella Beedle, Gyda Roberts, Jeannie Cave, and Sue Cope.

== George Medal ==
Jones's most widely remembered act of bravery came during the Bristol Blitz on the evening of 24 November 1940, when incendiary bombs fell on top of a large gas holder at St Philip's, also described in some reports as being at Barton Hill. The holder stood within Bristol's principal gasworks district, where Avon Street and neighbouring installations formed part of a major concentration of industry in St Philip's. Wartime bombing caused repeated disruption to production and distribution across the Bristol gas system, and an explosion at the Folly Lane holder would have threatened the densely built neighbourhoods of The Dings, St Philip's, and Barton Hill.

Jones climbed the structure during the raid and dealt with the bombs by hand. Two incendiaries had lodged on the crown of the holder, and he climbed to the top and knocked them clear with his steel hat. During the same raid, after bomb splinters punctured the holder, he repeatedly went out to find and temporarily stop the escaping gas, despite the attack still being at its height. He was also credited with helping to extinguish a later fire at a badly punctured gas holder while off duty, before serious damage was done. Contemporary and later accounts in the Bristol press broadly agree on the essentials of the episode, while later retellings added that he broke a toe while kicking one bomb clear and used clay to plug holes caused by splinters as he descended.

For these actions he was awarded the George Medal in 1941. In May that year he travelled to Buckingham Palace, where the medal was presented by King George VI. Family members and friends later recalled that he remained embarrassed by the attention and said little about the incident. According to one account, after returning home he simply placed the medal in a drawer, where it remained for many years until his death.

== Later life and death ==
After the war Jones continued his work in education welfare while remaining at the centre of Bristol Central Swimming Club. He oversaw the club's expansion across more than three decades and remained closely involved in west-country swimming. His family was closely involved in the club as well: his wife Lily and their children were members, while his daughters Pat and Maureen and his son John all represented Gloucestershire in swimming.

He retired from his post as a school welfare officer around 1965 but remained active in swimming and coaching. Jones died suddenly at his Bristol home, 8 Plimsoll House, Burton Close, in the Redcliffe Estate, on 24 February 1969, aged 69. He was survived by his widow, son, and two daughters.

== Legacy ==
Jones continued to be remembered in Bristol both for his wartime gallantry and for his contribution to swimming. In 1969 Bristol Central Swimming Club launched a memorial fund in his name, the proceeds of which were to be passed to the Western Counties Amateur Swimming Association for a memorial of wider than purely club significance. The club also commemorated him through the George Jones Trophy, later referred to as the George Jones Jubilee Trophy, awarded for outstanding service or performance, a practice that started before his death. Today, his name continues to be preserved more widely within competitive swimming through the G. D. Jones Memorial Trophy, awarded at the Swim England National Winter Championships to the highest-ranked female junior swimmer in the 200 metre backstroke.

In the 1980s and 1990s the local historian Benjamin Price campaigned for a permanent memorial on the site of the former gas holder. A plaque was unveiled there in November 1995 by Jones's children, John and Pat, with support from British Gas and the Bristol Development Corporation. The present-day location of the plaque corresponds to Folly Lane, with the nearby George Jones Road also named in his memory.
