= Netham Park =

Park in Bristol, England

- Netham Recreation Ground
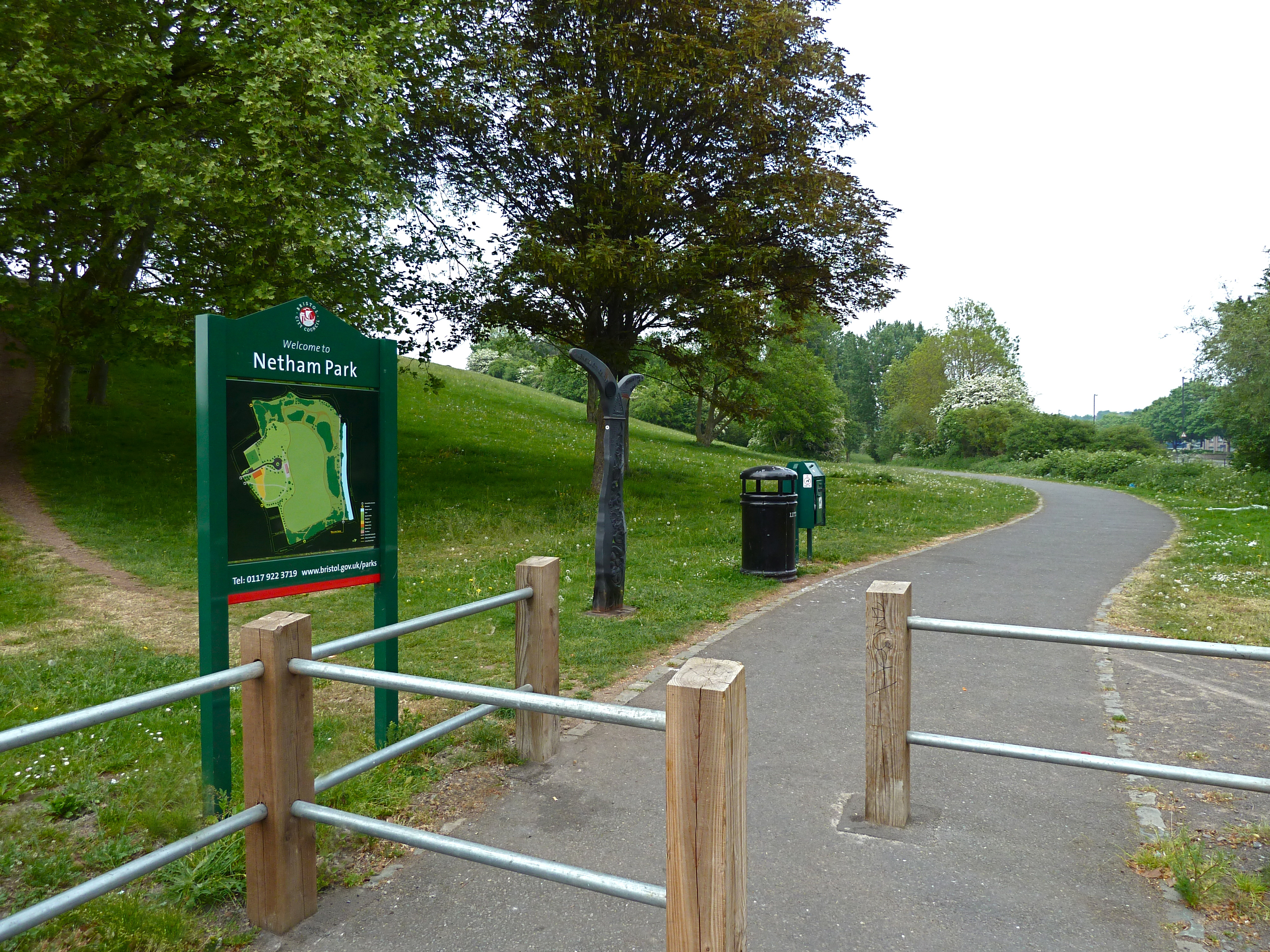
- Interactive map of Netham Park
- Type: Urban park
- Location: Redfield / Barton Hill, Bristol, England
- Coordinates: 51.4539°N 2.5564°W
- Area: 38.9 acres (15.7 ha)
- Owner: Bristol City Council
- Operator: Bristol City Council; Friends of Netham Park
- Status: Open all year
- Facilities: Sports pitches, multi-use games area, children's playground, pavilion
- Website: www.bristol.gov.uk/residents/museums-parks-sports-and-culture/parks-and-open-spaces/parks-and-estates/netham-park-and-pavilion

Netham Park (historically Netham Recreation Ground) is a public urban park in Bristol, England. Located between the neighbourhoods of Redfield and Barton Hill, it overlooks the Feeder Canal and the River Avon. The park occupies land formerly used by the Netham Chemical Works, and was converted into public recreation space in the mid-20th century as part of the wider redevelopment of the Barton Hill area.

Netham Park has served as a case study in academic research regarding urban green space, specifically how ethnicity, religion, and perceived safety influence access and usage patterns in inner-city parks.

== History ==
=== Netham Chemical Works ===
Prior to its designation as a park, the site was occupied by the Netham Chemical Works. Established in 1859, the facility expanded to cover approximately 40 acres (16 ha), extending from Marsh Lane to Blackswarth Road. The works produced sulphuric acid (vitriol) and washing soda using the Leblanc process, and later ammonium chloride (sal ammoniac).

The industrial landscape was dominated by a 300-foot (91 m) chimney stack constructed from an estimated half-million bricks. Known locally as the "Netham Monster", it was a prominent landmark on the Bristol skyline. In 1927, the facility was acquired by Imperial Chemical Industries (ICI). The chemical production processes generated vast quantities of industrial waste which were deposited on-site, creating an artificial topography of mounds and valleys. This waste ground was colloquially referred to by local residents as The Brillos, a name potentially derived from barilla, an alkali-bearing plant ash used in early chemical production.

=== Transition to parkland ===
The chemical works ceased operations in 1949. Although the site was largely cleared following closure, some structures survived into the late 20th century; a guide to Avon's industrial heritage recorded sections of the perimeter wall and former gateway arches on Blackswarth Road as visible remnants. The wider works occupied about 65 acres (26 ha), while the modern extent of the park is 38.9 acres (15.7 ha).

In June 1949, as the works approached closure, the Bristol Corporation began negotiations to acquire the site, allowing immediate public use of existing recreation fields while purchase terms were finalised. Terms discussed at the time included rights for ICI to continue removing material from the waste heap, including a deposit of lime, for a limited period. A cross-committee site visit was reported the following month, with the intention of taking over the recreation fields for local use.

In May 1950, Bristol City Council approved the purchase of 52 acres (21 ha) of land and buildings from ICI for £40,000 to address a shortage of open space in the eastern part of the city. The large chimney was demolished the same year. Development was complicated by residual contamination; early reuse of the area reportedly saw stored rubber ignite after interacting with polluted ground.

Although the site's access was restricted due to chemical waste, it still became an unsanctioned play area for local children. In 1955, local headmasters and the Bristol Youth Committee warned pupils that the site was dangerous after levelling work uncovered layers of chemicals previously unexposed to air. The City Engineer's department stated that some excavated materials could become chemically active and give off gases; the council reported that samples had been sent for analysis, warning notices posted, and a watchman employed at weekends. The council subsequently capped the industrial spoil heaps with soil excavated from the construction of Chew Valley Lake to create the Netham Recreation Ground, though the general topography still remains.

After acquiring the site, council committees considered reusing the former ICI pavilion as a community facility, noting its central hall and buffet, though councillors debated whether there was sufficient local demand to justify the upkeep of a dedicated community centre. In 1962, Bristol's Planning Committee evaluated proposals for district running tracks, including one at Netham, arguing that training facilities were a higher priority than a large central stadium. A later report set out the City Engineer's view that training facilities were the immediate priority, while noting that such works could form the first stage of a larger scheme.

In January 1963, the Bristol Planning Committee approved a scheme to construct a £65,000 sports stadium on the site to replace a Civil Defence training ground. The proposal included a combined athletics and cycle track with terraced accommodation for 15,000 spectators. This proposal faced local opposition, with critics arguing that concentrating investment at Netham would come at the expense of smaller facilities elsewhere in the city.

In the early 1970s, following redevelopment at the former Eastville Workhouse, Bristol City Council removed human remains that had been uncovered there and reinterred them in an unmarked mass grave in the grounds of Netham Park. The reburial was one of many not publicly acknowledged until being later identified by local historians in 2019.

In 1978, approval was given for the construction of a sports centre next to the existing bowling pavilion, to include squash courts, a sauna, and a weight training room. In 1979, the recreation ground hosted a three-month trial of a cycle speedway track.

On 28 May 1987, Diana, Princess of Wales visited the park, arriving by helicopter to a crowd of approximately 800 people before touring nearby youth centres.

The construction of the pavilion and wider redevelopment of the park were undertaken as part of the New Deal for Communities, a government regeneration scheme implemented in the area between 2000 and 2011.

== Community ==
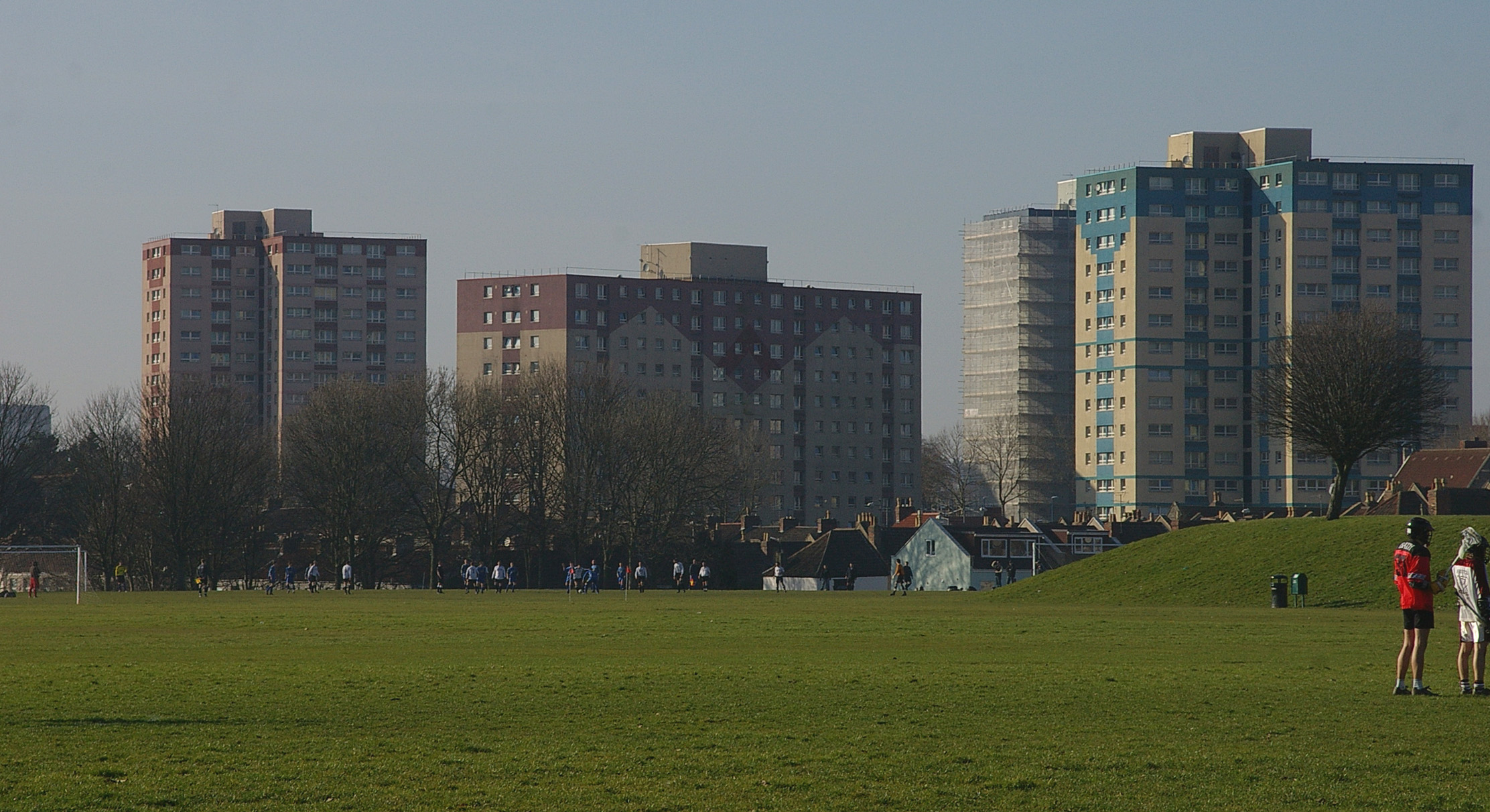
A view of the park's landscape with the Barton Hill towers in the distance

Netham Park is situated in an inner-city area characterised by high ethnic diversity and socioeconomic deprivation. The park has been used as a case study in academic research on how local residents experience and use urban green space, including the ways in which access can be shaped by social and cultural factors.

The park is used for community events, including Eid al-Fitr celebrations. In 2021, COVID-19 restrictions led to this being done in the form of outdoor prayer. The park is partly maintained by the Friends of Netham Park community group. In collaboration with the Avon Wildlife Trust, the group maintains specific areas as nature reserves.

A 2025 study of urban green space accessibility identified barriers affecting the use of Netham Park by some ethnic minority residents. In participant accounts, dogs were a prominent deterrent for users from Pakistani and Somali backgrounds, linked to religious observance and concerns about uncontrolled animals. The study also reported that emotional factors, such as feeling unsafe or unwelcome, could matter as much as physical access, and participants suggested clearer zoning and management measures, such as dog-free times or stronger enforcement of leash rules. Further research published in Children's Geographies (2025) used arts-based methods to explore how children in Barton Hill relate to the park, noting that children's use of the space was shaped by safety concerns including dogs and anti-social behaviour.

== Facilities ==
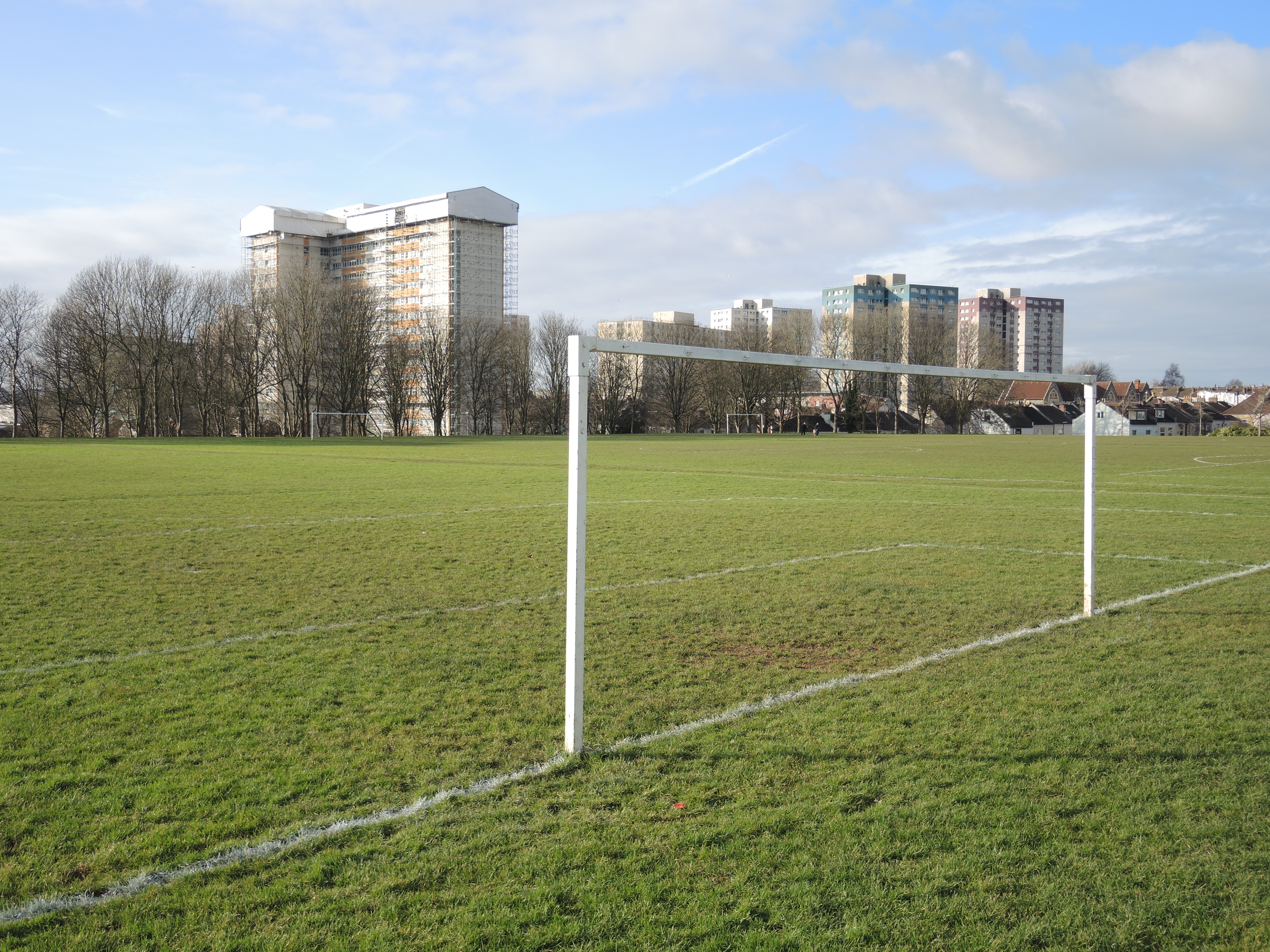
Association football and cricket pitches in the park

Netham Park consists primarily of open grassed areas, smaller designated areas for sports, a children's playground, and a pavilion supporting organised sports on the pitches.

=== Sports and recreation ===
The park's main sporting facilities are a set of grass pitches, including three football pitches and a cricket pitch, with the latter used as the home ground of the Bristol Pakistani Cricket Club. There is also a multi-use games area for ball sports and training, a basketball court, and a marked 500-metre (1,600 ft) route for walking and jogging.

=== Play areas ===
Community concerns have periodically focused on the safety and condition of the children's play provision. In 1998, a local resident organised an 800-signature petition calling for safer surfacing after reports of children being injured when falling on the playground's concrete base.

A major improvement programme followed in the late 2000s through Bristol's Play Pathfinder investment, upgrading the play area to better serve older children while maintaining equipment for younger users. The redevelopment organised the previously open space into three zones: a fenced, dog-free area containing younger children's equipment; an open zone aimed at older children with more challenging structures; and a hard-surfaced enclosed area intended for ball games. The design incorporated natural elements such as boulders and grass mounding to encourage less prescriptive play. Subsequent funding for further play-area works has also been identified through local Community Infrastructure Levy allocations that remained unimplemented as of September 2025.

=== Pavilion ===
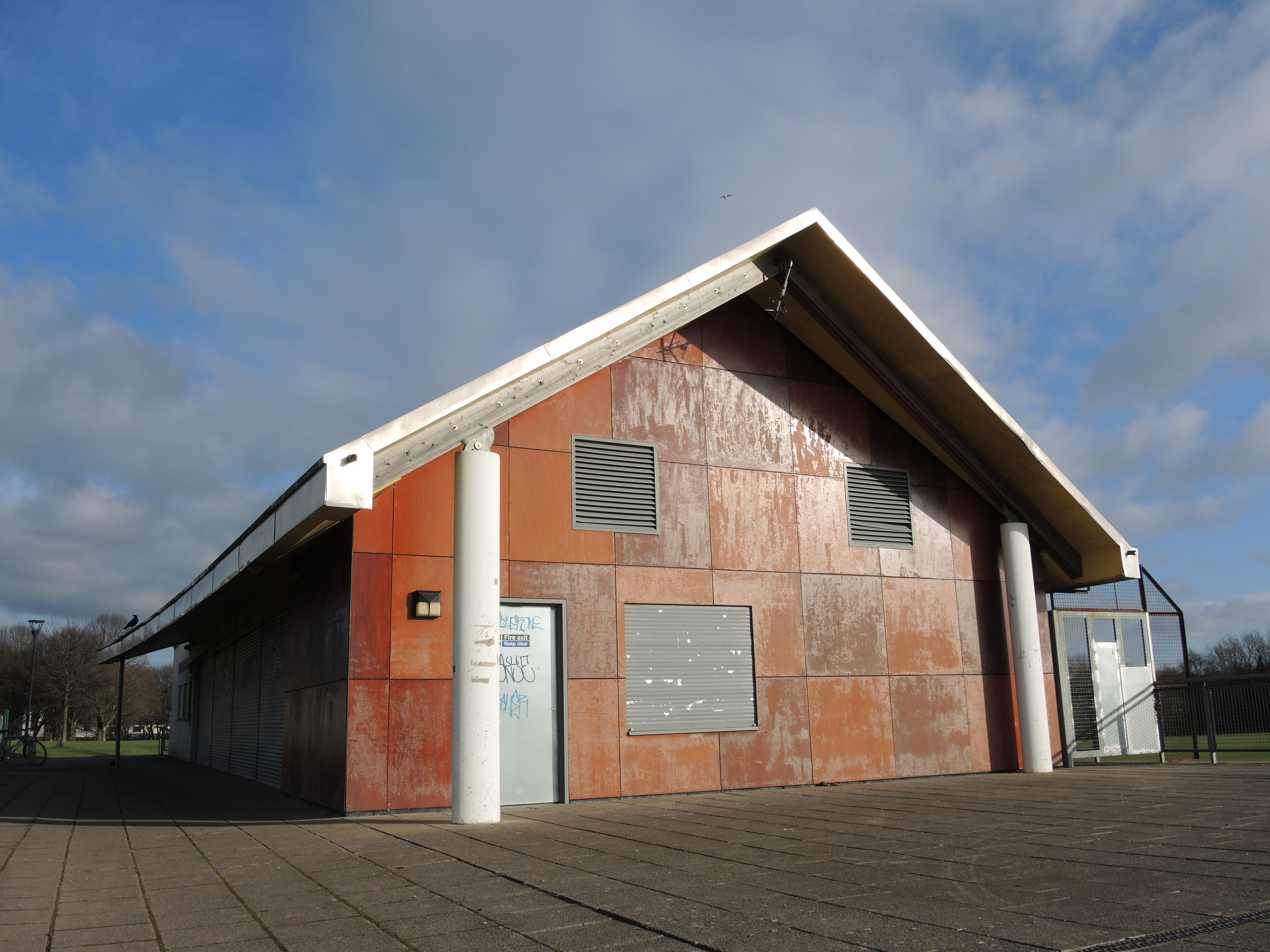
The Netham Pavilion

A pavilion building adjoins the sports area, providing changing accommodation and ancillary space for park users and organised sport. The current building was designed to sit along the steep bank that separates the park's upper and lower areas. Designed by the Bristol firm Alec French Architects, it features a two-storey arrangement with a lower floor set partly into the embankment; the construction budget was approximately £1.7 million.

The facility currently serves pre-booked weekend fixtures rather than general access. The building was closed to the public during the COVID-19 pandemic in 2020 and remained shuttered as of 2024. In 2021, a consortium of local organisations, including the Bristol Pakistani Cricket Club, Bristol Co-operative Gym and Eastside Community Trust, submitted a Community asset transfer bid to refurbish the pavilion and reopen it as a community hub. By August 2024, the continued closure attracted local criticism over the delay in transferring management to a third party.

=== Walking and cycling routes ===
Netham Park forms part of several promoted walking and cycling routes along the River Avon and the Feeder Canal. A Travelwest route from Bristol Temple Meads to Conham River Park (5.5 mi (8.9 km)) uses the riverside path beside the Floating Harbour and River Avon, crosses Marsh Lane Bridge into Netham Park, then follows the canal-side path beside the Feeder Canal before rejoining Feeder Road. The River Avon Trail (about 21 mi (34 km)) also runs between Temple Quarter and Bath Green Park, using the park in its route along the lower edge and past a sand martin nesting colony on the Feeder Canal.

== See also ==
- Parks of Bristol
