= Trinity Road Library, Bristol =

Historic building in Bristol, England

Trinity Road Library
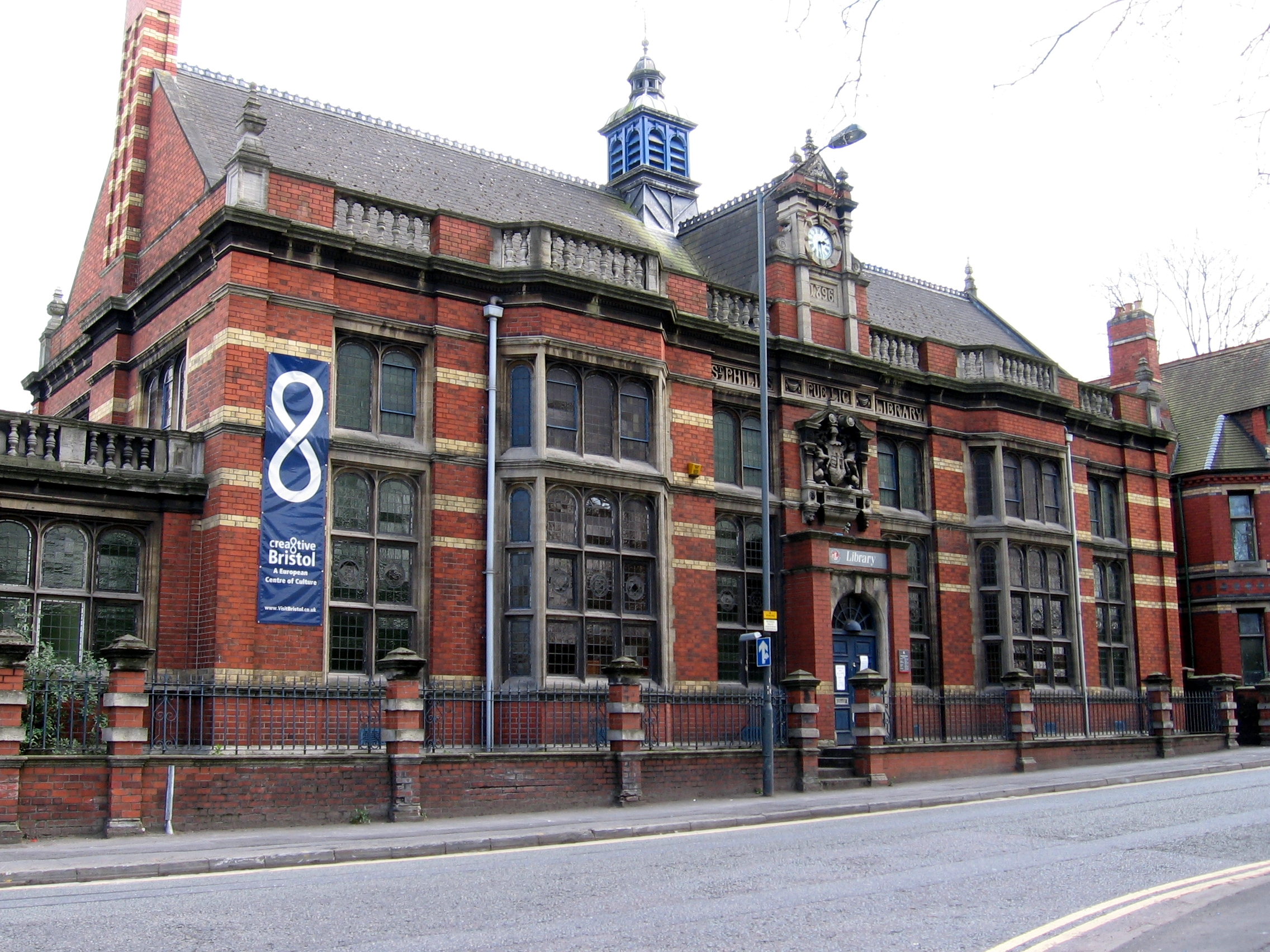

- Location within Bristol

General information
- Architectural style: Jacobethan
- Location: Bristol, England
- Coordinates: 51.4588°N 2.5764°W
- Completed: 1896

Design and construction
- Architect: William Venn Gough

Trinity Road Library is a historic building situated on Trinity Road, St Philips, Bristol, England.

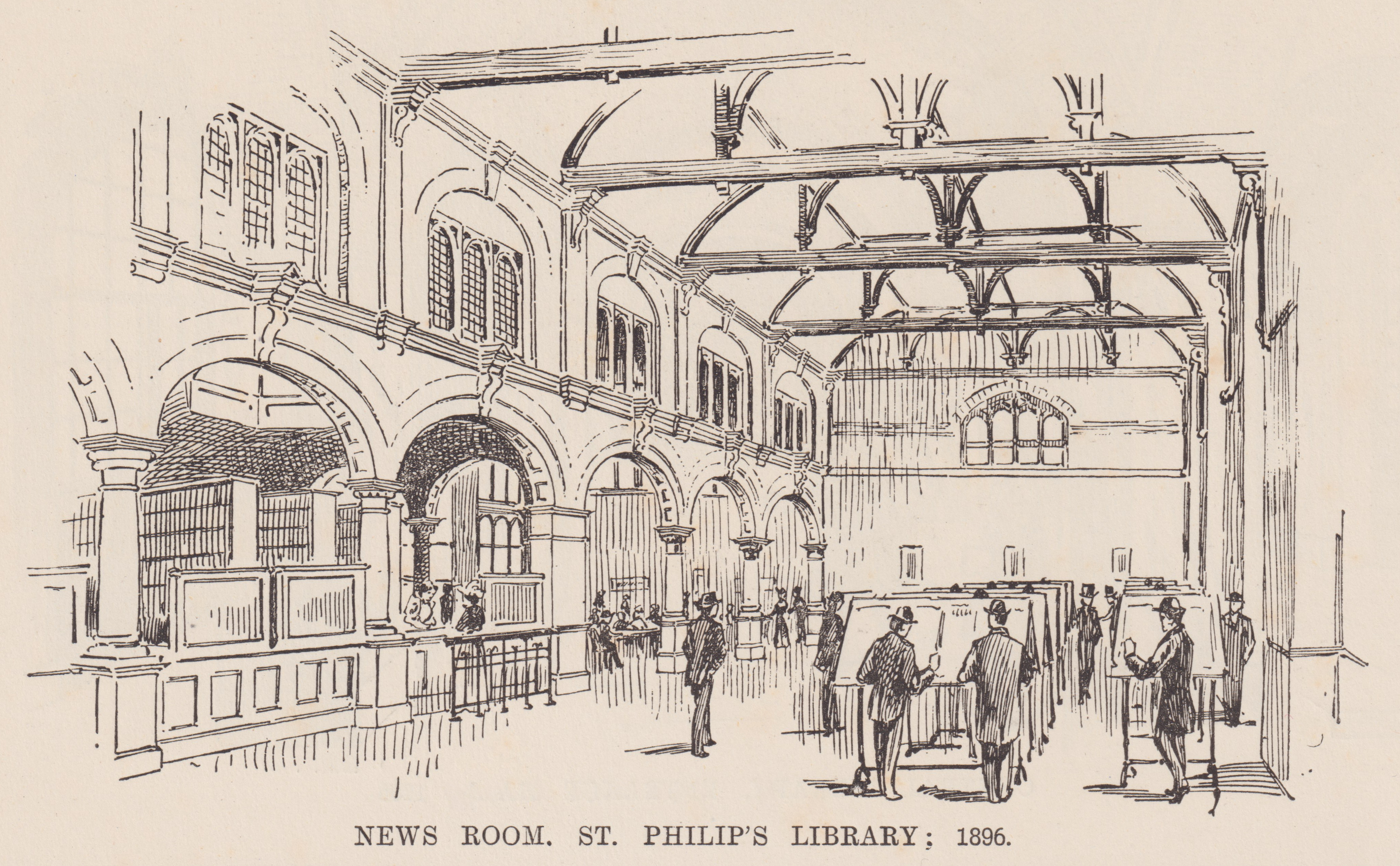
News Room, 1896

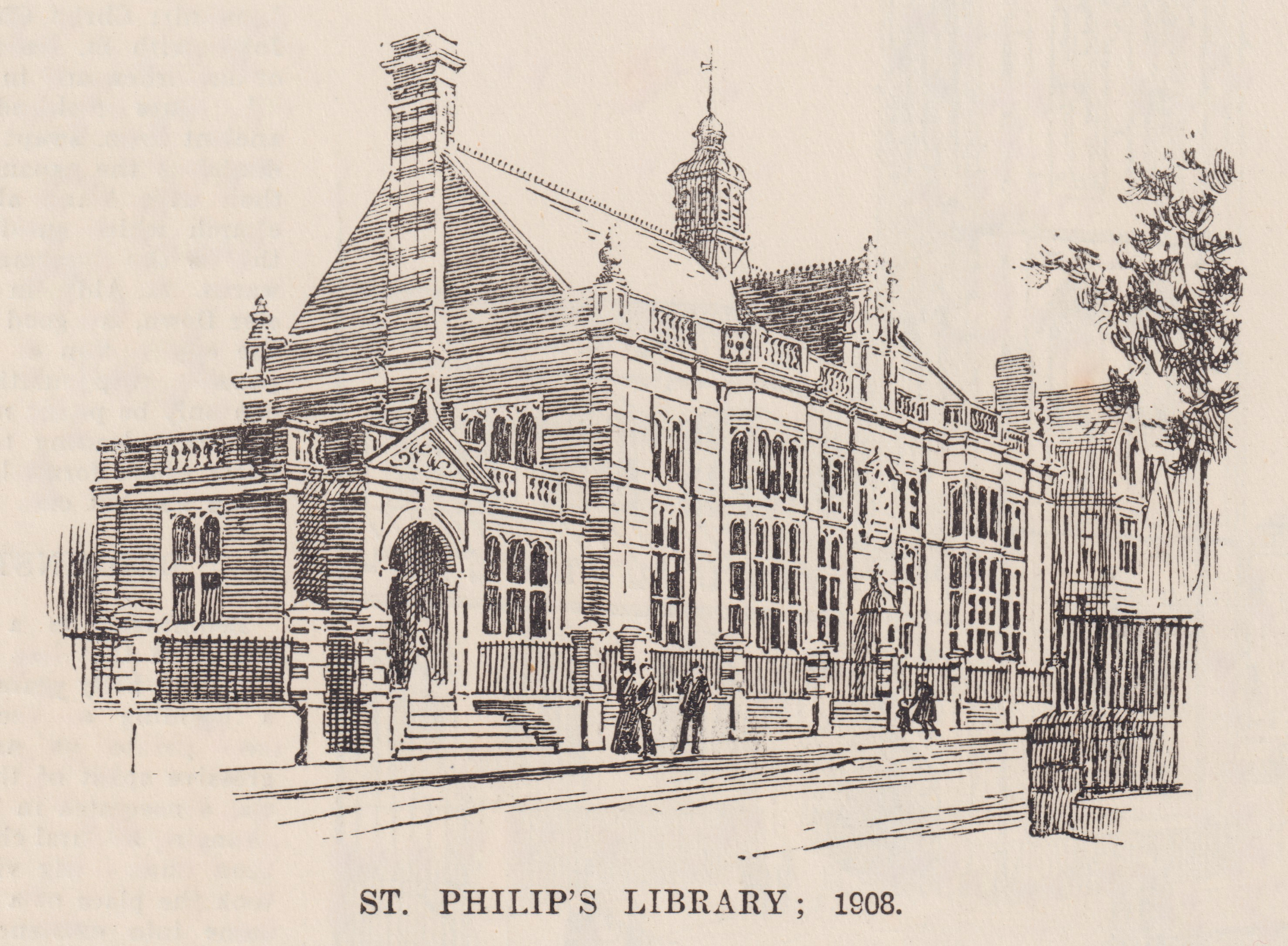
St Philip's Library, 1908

St Philips was Bristol's first branch library, opened in 1876. This was replaced by a new library on Trinity Road in 1896 in a Jacobethan style, to the plans of William Venn Gough, and bears an inscription with its original name, St Philips Public Library. It closed as a public library on 28 November 2012.

It has been designated by English Heritage as a grade II listed building.

== See also ==
- Trinity Centre
- Trinity Road (police station)
- Bristol Central Library
