= The Dings, Bristol =

Neighbourhood of Bristol, England

Coordinates: 51.452°N 2.576°W

The Dings
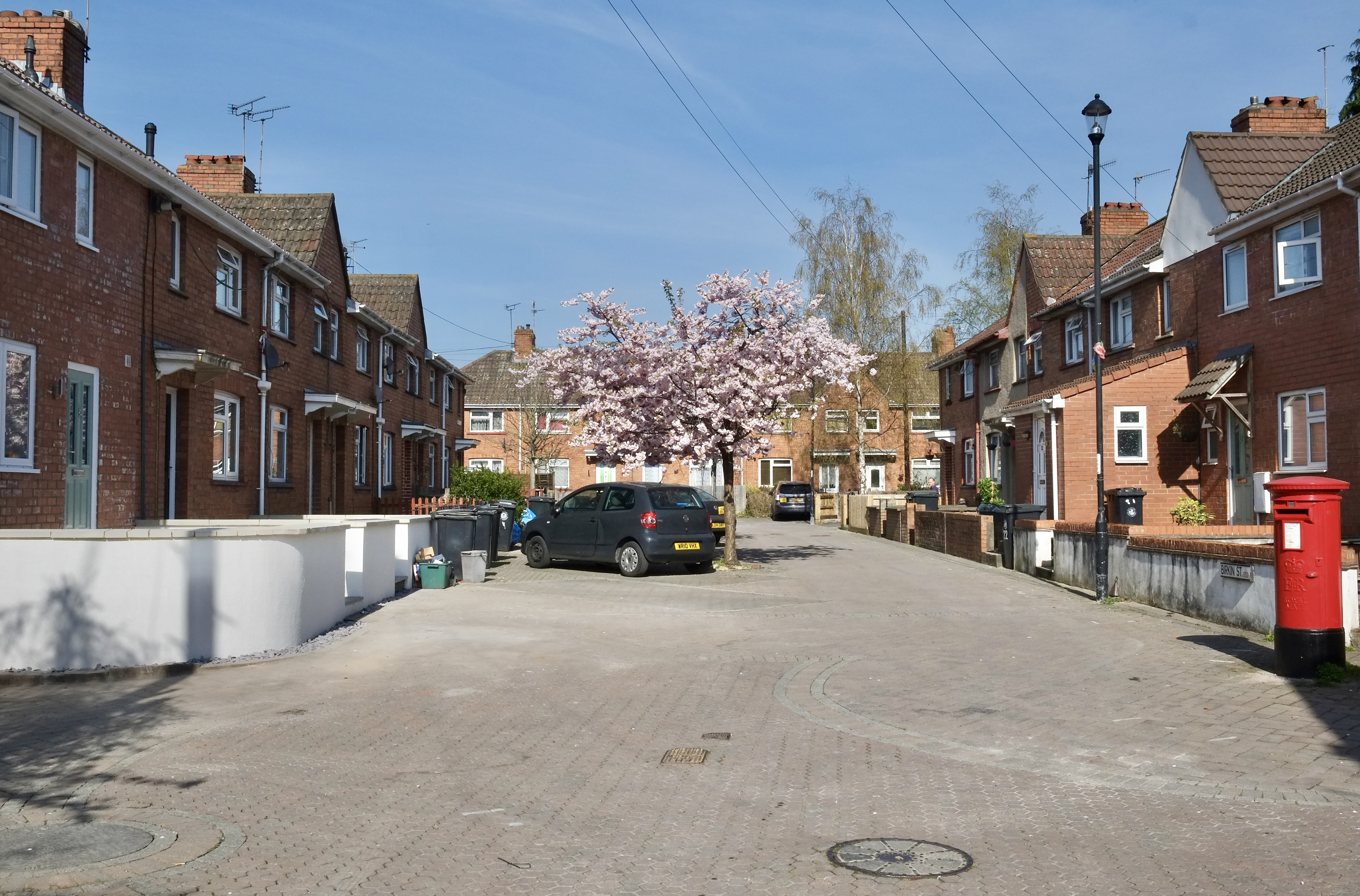
- A view of Union Road in The Dings, looking northwest. The pedestrianisation of the roads as part of the home zone is clearly visible.

- Location within Bristol
- Unitary authority: Bristol
- Ceremonial county: Bristol
- Region: South West
- Country: England
- Sovereign state: United Kingdom
- Post town: BRISTOL
- Postcode district: BS2
- Dialling code: 0117
- Police: Avon and Somerset
- Fire: Avon
- Ambulance: South Western
- UK Parliament: Bristol East

The Dings is a neighbourhood in the St Philip's district of central Bristol, England. It is part of the Lawrence Hill ward, and is located south of Old Market and Newtown. Enclosed by the Temple Meads rail corridor, the Feeder Canal and the industrial estates of St Philip's Marsh, The Dings has historically been distinguished by its tight grid of late-Victorian terraces and by a strong sense of local identity that prompts The Dings Community Association to describe it as "a village in the city”. It is also the site of Bristol's first home zone, which has been the subject of published case studies.

== History ==
=== Origins ===
Historical records show the area named Dynges (1299) and Bengs (1610), likely derived from Old English ding/deng (ground used for withy growing). Until the mid-19th century the area remained marshy common land on the fringe of St Philip & St Jacob parish. Rapid urbanisation followed construction of the Great Western Railway in 1840 and of riverside industry along the Feeder Canal.

=== Victorian community ===
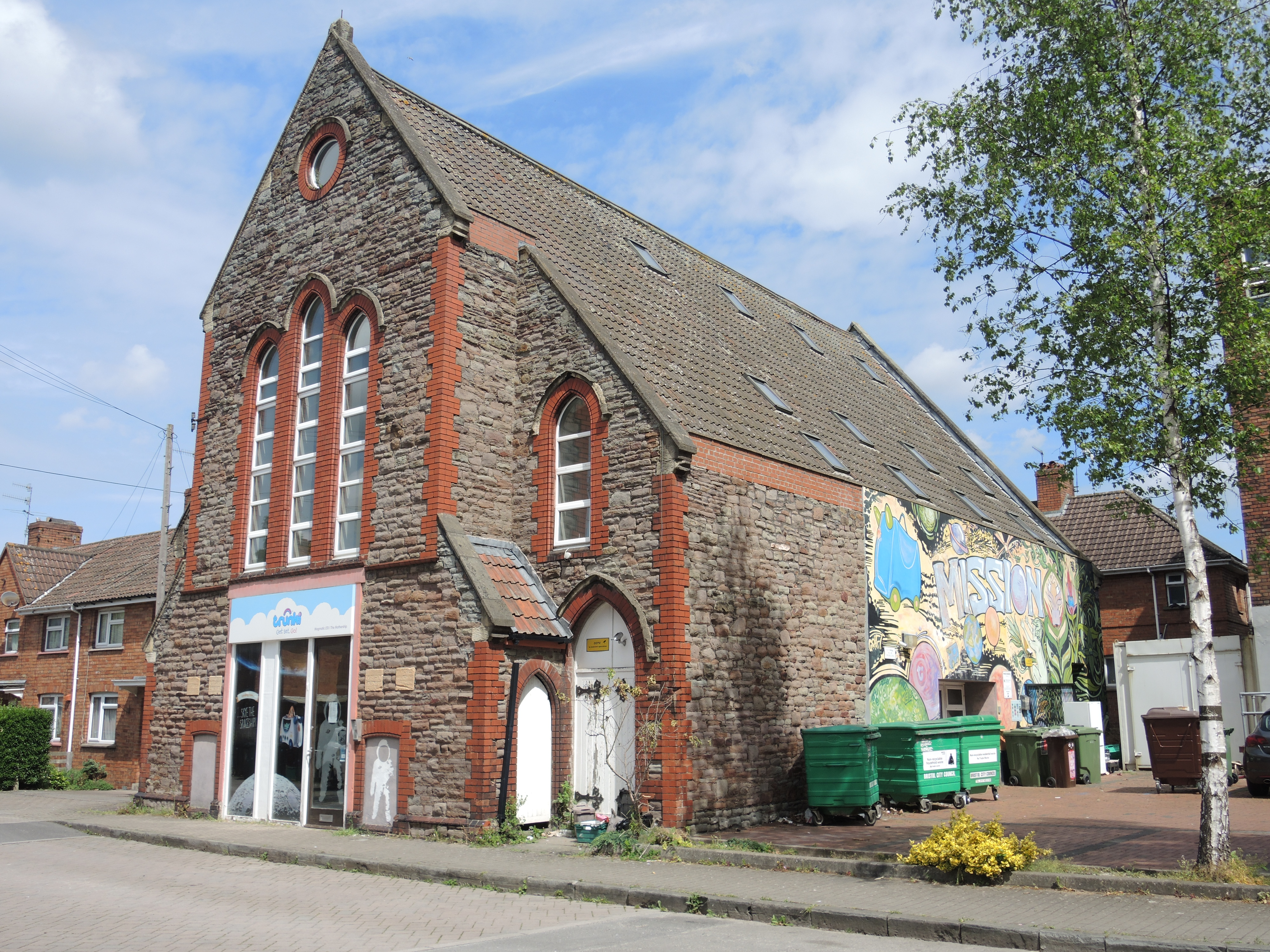
The former St Silas Mission Hall, now commercial units.

By the 1880s the Dings contained terraced houses arranged in seven parallel streets, with a population of approximately 4000 by 1899. Census material showed that 76% of heads of household were engaged in manual work, notably dock labour, railway portering and iron founding. Nonconformity was strong, with Kingsland Road Congregational Chapel (1870) and the St Silas Mission Hall (1893) attracting large Sunday-school enrolments and running popular Bible classes, boys' brigades and temperance clubs.

=== Home Zone ===
Prolonged neglect of The Dings and the surrounding area left streets blighted by rat-running traffic, commuter parking and a lack of green space. In 2002–05 the streets were rebuilt as part of one of the UK's first home zone schemes, funded through the EU CIVITAS-VIVALDI programme and Bristol City Council. Existing pavements of the roads and sidewalks were replaced by a single shared-surface in coloured permeable block paving as part of a sustainable drainage system installation, traffic speeds were reduced to 10 mph and large sculptural gateways to signal pedestrian priority. By 2024, locals continued to praise the scheme's traffic-calmed streets, sculptural gateways, and Safe ’Ouse youth club which now functions as the heart of community life.

=== Regeneration within Temple Quarter ===
Since 2010 the Dings has been encircled by major brownfield redevelopment including the Temple Quarter enterprise zone and University of Bristol's Temple Campus. A 2023 framework proposes 10 000 new homes and three new entrances to Temple Meads. Community benefits have included refurbishment of the youth Safe 'Ouse centre in 2024.

== Community ==
The Dings Community Association was established in 1993 and coordinates neighbourhood watch, gardening groups and youth clubs and publishes a quarterly newsletter. Oral history interviews have portrayed strong neighbourly ties, fostered historically by chapel activities and by the Dings Boys' Club Rugby XV at the Shaftesbury Crusade building, whose successors play as Dings Crusaders RFC. The current community is composed of working-class and minority ethnic residents.

== Infrastructure and amenities ==
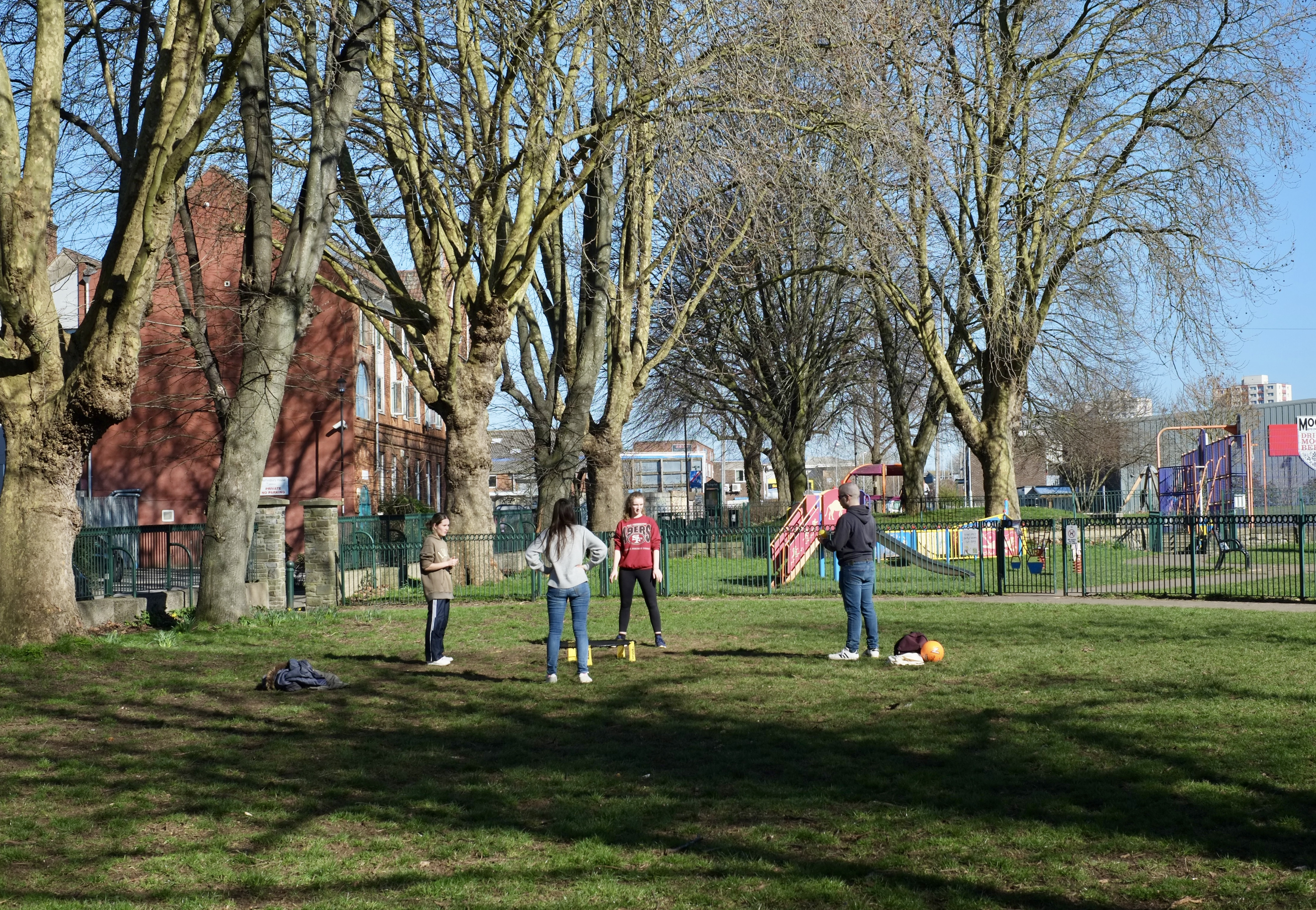
The Dings Park includes lawns suitable for informal sports games and a fenced playground that includes climbing frames and other play equipment.

Located 300 m east of Bristol Temple Meads, The Dings is also served by National Cycle Network Route 3 along the Feeder Canal towpath, providing a traffic-free commuter link into the city centre. Following complaints by the local community regarding the lack of provision of a bus service despite nearby development, funding was secured by the Old Market Community Association, The Dings Community Association, and the West of England Combined Authority to establish a trial for the 61 "The Dings Community Bus" service.

Community amenities include Dings Park (home to the Safe 'Ouse), the Grade II listed Congregational Chapel on Kingsland Road (now containing small commercial units), and a cluster of cafés and businesses on and around Silverthorne Lane.

== Notable people ==
- Private Alfred Jefferies (1896–1916), Somerset Light Infantry soldier shot for desertion at the Somme and honoured by a wreath-laying in Dings Park on the centenary of his execution.
- George Daniel Jones, local gas worker and founder of the Bristol Central Swimming Club, locally famous for removing two incendiary bombs from gas holders during the Bristol Blitz for which he was awarded the George Medal.
- Terry Ratcliffe (1930–1999), boxer who won gold for England at the 1950 British Empire Games.

== Bibliography ==
- Denley, Christian S. (2020). The Churches and the Working Class in the Dings, Bristol, c.1880-1910 (PDF) (MA dissertation). The Open University.
