= Saint Luke's Church, Barton Hill =

Church in Barton Hill, Bristol

Coordinates: 51.4544°N 2.5638°W

Church of Saint Luke
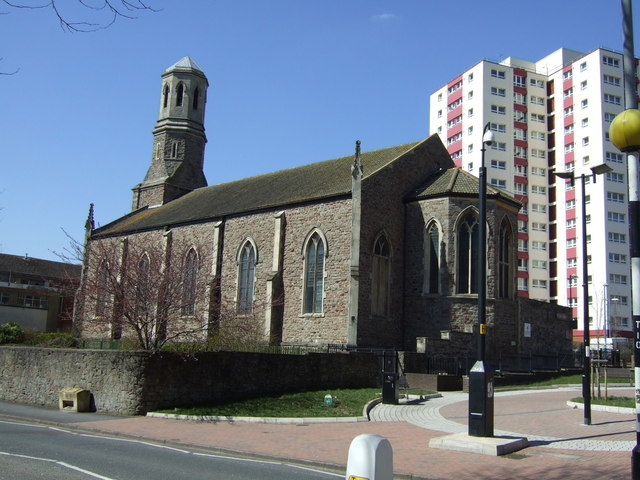
- The Church of St Luke
- Location: Barton Hill, Bristol
- Country: England
- Denomination: Church of England

History
- Founded: 1842

Architecture
- Architect: Samuel Thomas Welch
- Years built: 1842–1850

Administration
- Diocese: Diocese of Bristol
- Parish: Barton Hill

The Church of St Luke is a Church of England church located in the neighbourhood of Barton Hill, Bristol. It forms part of the parish of Barton Hill, along with Christ Church and St Matthew, Moorfields. Built between 1842 and 1850 to designs by Samuel Thomas Welch, it is a Grade II listed building.

== History ==
The church’s interior in the early 20th century.

The Church of St Luke was established in the rapidly expanding industrial district of Barton Hill during the nineteenth century. The foundation stone was laid by the Mayor of Bristol, P. W. S. Miles, on 24 May 1842.

The church was designed by the architect Samuel Thomas Welch and was constructed between 1842 and 1850. St Luke’s was one of the Commissioners’ churches built during the nineteenth century to provide additional Anglican accommodation for rapidly growing urban populations. The church underwent alterations in 1930 under the architect A. V. Gough.

During the twentieth century the church continued to serve the Barton Hill community. A memorial garden beside the church contains the Barton Hill School War Memorial, which commemorates 108 former Barton Hill boys who died during the First World War.

In September 2020, a fire broke out in the church hall, resulting in the closure of a nearby road. The Church of St Luke was designated a Grade II listed building on 30 December 1994.

== Architecture ==
The church is constructed principally of Pennant rubble with limestone dressings and has a Roman-tile roof. It is designed in a Gothic Revival style and consists of a nave, a twentieth-century apse and a western tower.

The north elevation is of five bays and is divided by buttresses. It contains a central raised gable. The western tower is square and rises in three stages. It contains an arched entrance. Above the tower is a belfry with a leaded roof. The tower originally had a small spire.

The interior contains an eight-bay nave A rear gallery is supported on slender columns and has a decorated balustrade.
