= The Great Western Cotton Factory =

Coordinates: 51.452821°N 2.562899°W

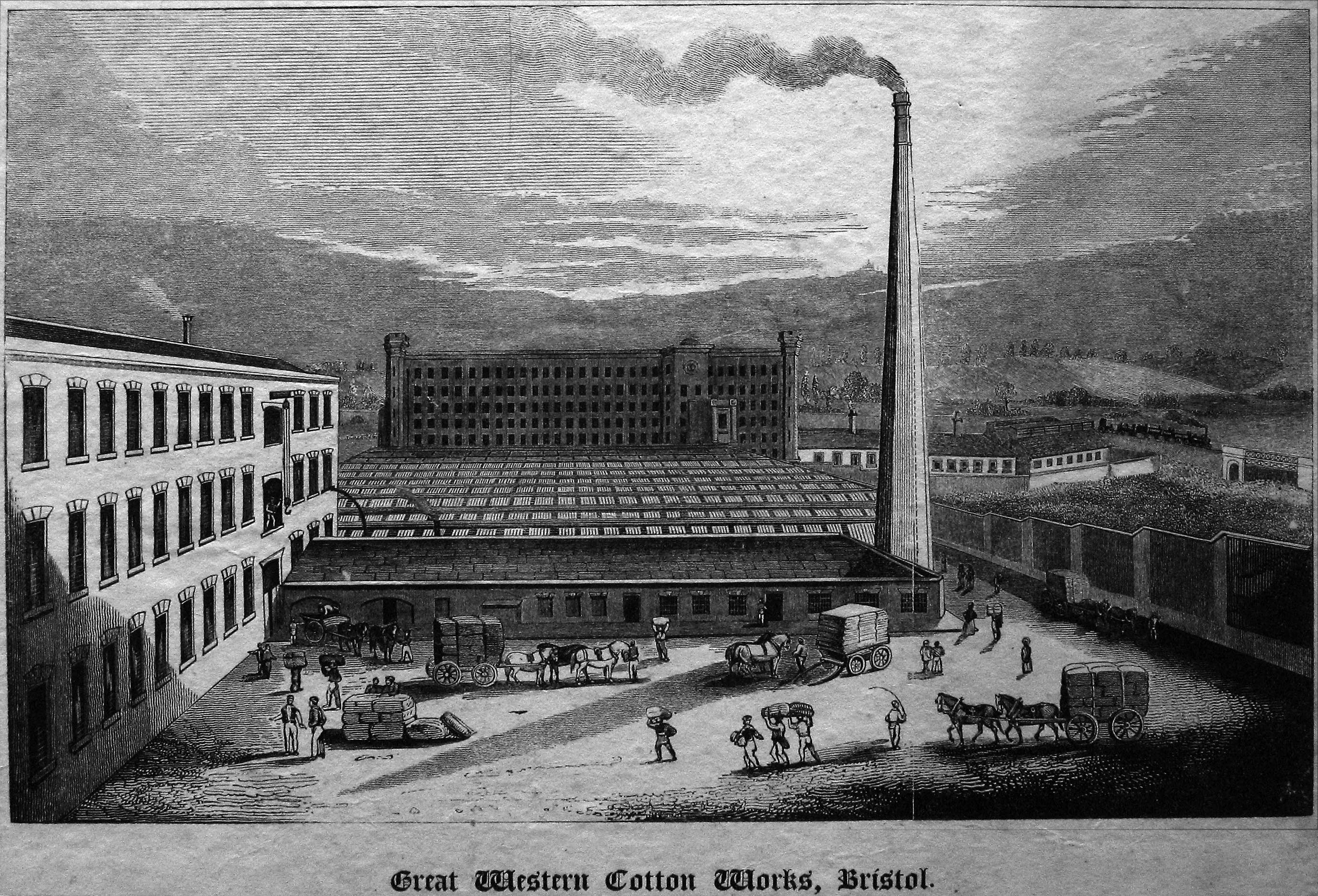
Great Western Cotton Factory

The Great Western Cotton Factory was opened on a site in Barton Hill, Bristol in April 1838 (188 years ago) to spin and weave cotton into cloth. The cotton processed at the factory was brought from America to the port of Liverpool and carried by water to Bristol. It was the only example of a cotton mill in South West England, most other factories being in Lancashire, Yorkshire, Cheshire and Derbyshire.

== History ==
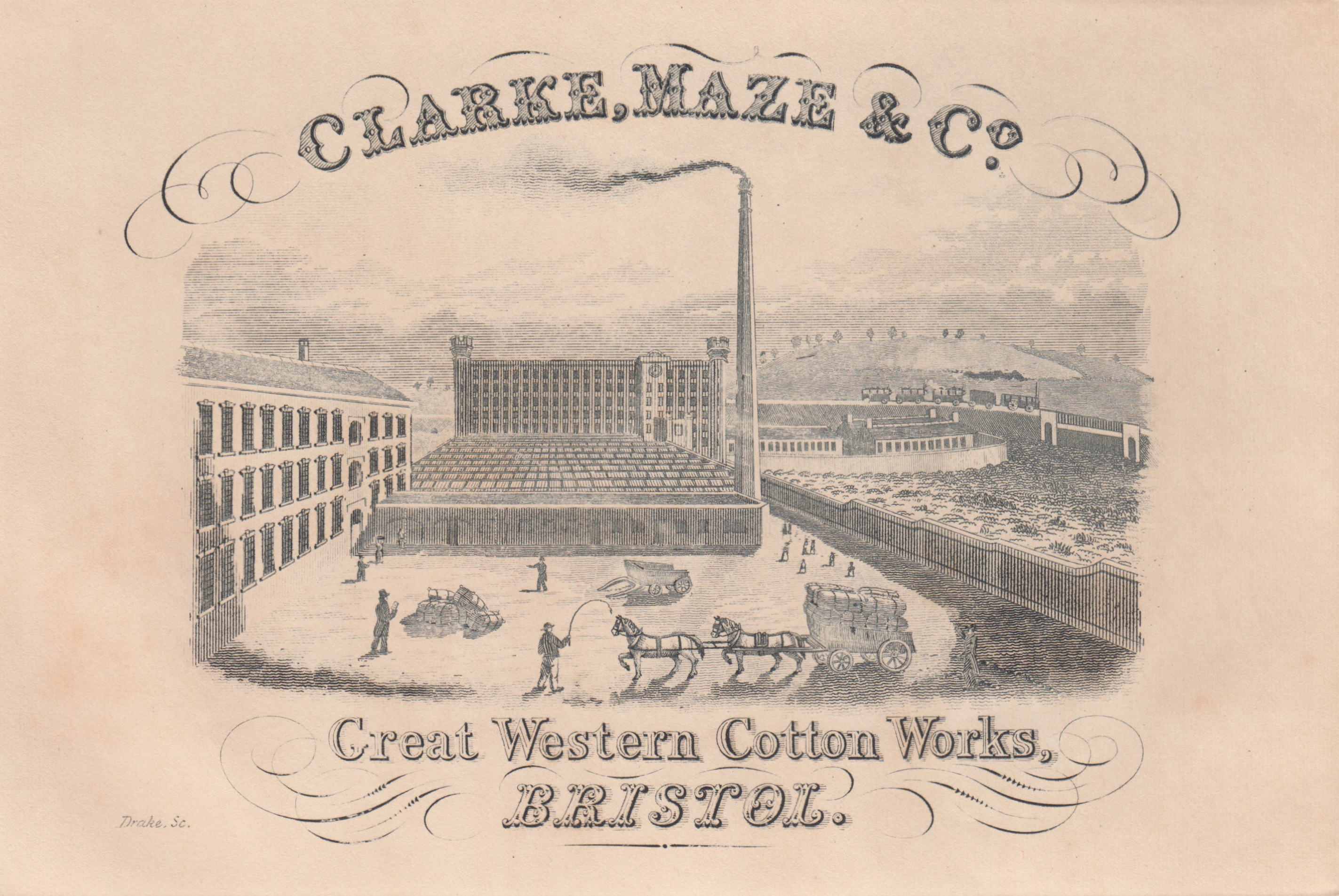
Great Western Cotton Works 1842

The Barton Hill district of Bristol was a rural retreat from the busy city centre up until the early nineteenth century when the digging of the Bristol Feeder Canal brought industries including the Great Western Cotton Company, keen to use the water as transport.

Strong links with the cotton mills of Manchester and Liverpool were forged through a partnership between northern businessmen and sixteen other shareholders from prosperous mercantile Bristol. By 1864 when the business became a limited company, two directors were Bristolian, three were from Manchester, one from Liverpool and one from Eccleshall. Expert workers, many of them women, were employed directly from northern England to get production started and work the specialist machinery:

Hundreds upon hundreds of women and girls, with headgear consisting of red and white plaid shawls… Many of them being Northerners, who appeared to be chatting cheerfully in a language which was simply double Dutch to the unlearned.

A lot of the finance for new investment in Bristol in the nineteenth century was derived from profits from the Atlantic slave trade, as well as compensation paid to owners of slaves following the Slavery Abolition Act 1833. Robert Bright and George Gibbs, West India merchants, Gibbs Bright & Co. were active in the slave trade and both were original shareholders in the Great Western Cotton Company alongside the Manchester cotton manufacturer, Joseph Bell Clarke. Other Bristol merchants, bankers and businessmen who were shareholders of the Great Western Cotton Factory included William Edward Acraman, Alfred John Acraman, Peter Maze, Richard Ricketts, Frederick Ricketts, Henry Bush Thomas Kington the younger, Charles Pinney, Robert Edward Case, Henry Bush, Philip William Skynner Miles, George Henry Ames, Peter Freeland Aiken, James George, Daniel Cave and Joseph Cookson.

Slavery compensation was used by a number of these shareholders to form initial investments in the Great Western Cotton Company. For example, Henry Bush invested some of his share of £7,247 compensation (relative value in 2014: £9,836,000 as income) for the emancipation of slaves on a Barbados plantation in the Great Western Cotton Company.

By the end of the nineteenth century, board members included Albert and Lewis Fry, and members of the Miles and Harford banking families.

The later nineteenth century saw a wave of strikes and threatened strikes from workers across Bristol. The Great Western Cotton Works was subject to strikes in 1858, 1864, 1865, 1869, 1873, twice in 1875, 1878, 1879, 1882, 1884, 1889 and 1900, almost always regarding cuts to pay or pay increases not being in line with those in Northern England.

In 1925 the company had to go into liquidation following a recession, and the building was used by the Western Viscose Silk Company until 1929. In 1968 the building was demolished, leaving only the remnants of the weaving sheds in the Barton Hill Trading Estate on Cotton Mill Lane.

== Archives ==
Records of the Great Western Cotton Factory are held at Bristol Archives, (Ref. 13423/1-5) and (Ref. 12142).
