= Lawrence Hill, Bristol =

Electoral ward of Bristol, England

Coordinates: 51.457°N 2.57°W

Lawrence Hill
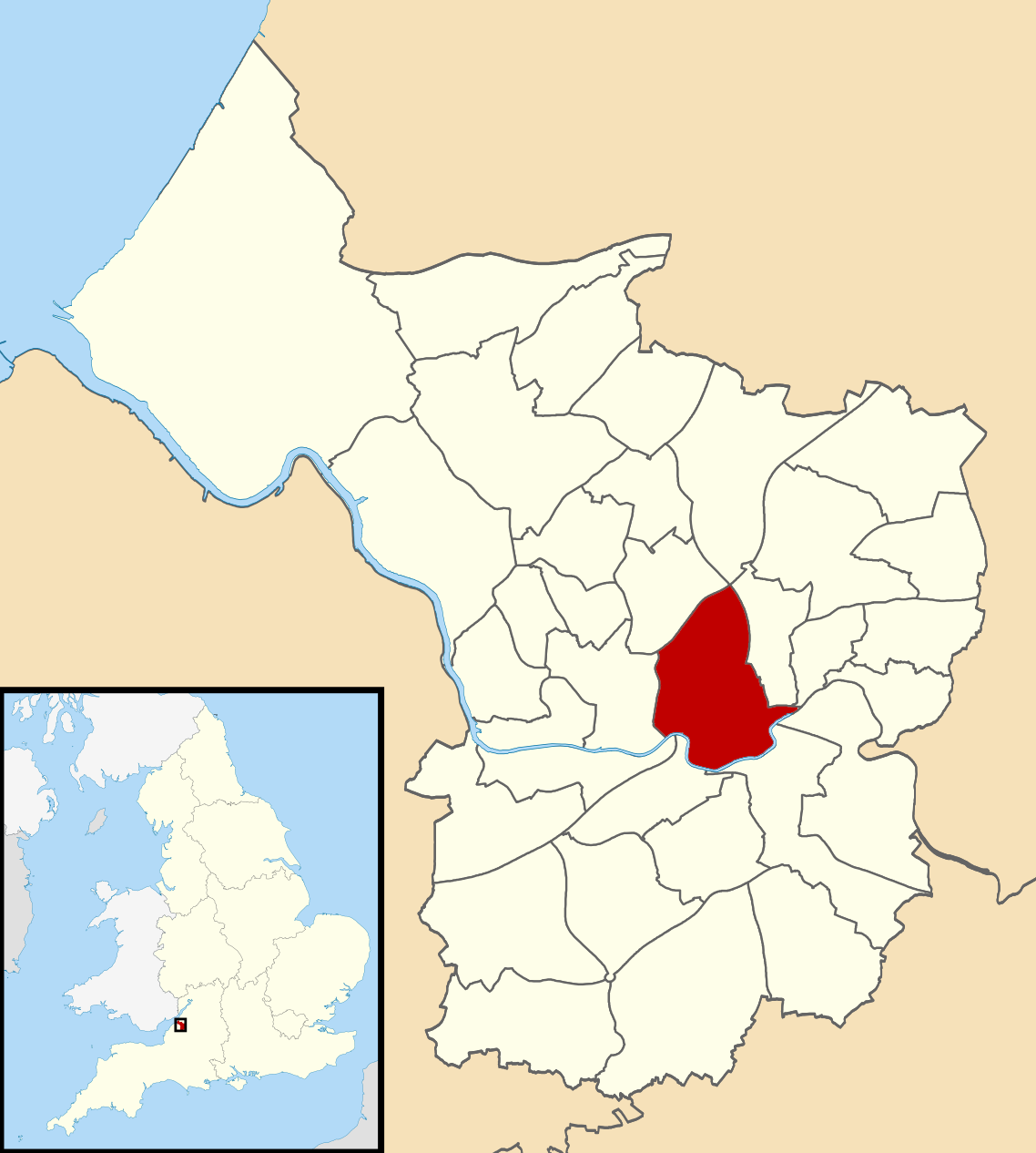
- Boundaries of the city council ward since 2016
- Population: 18,942 (2011.Ward)
- OS grid reference: ST604732
- Unitary authority: Bristol
- Ceremonial county: Bristol
- Region: South West
- Country: England
- Sovereign state: United Kingdom
- Post town: BRISTOL
- Postcode district: BS5
- Dialling code: 0117
- Police: Avon and Somerset
- Fire: Avon
- Ambulance: South Western
- UK Parliament: Bristol East

Lawrence Hill is an electoral ward of Bristol, United Kingdom and includes the districts of Barton Hill, St Philips Marsh and Redcliffe, Temple Meads and parts of Easton and the Broadmead shopping area. Lawrence Hill takes its name from a leper hospital dedicated to St Lawrence, which was founded by King John. This lay below what is now Lawrence Hill roundabout.

It is one of the most deprived electoral wards in the south west region of England, was part of the Bristol European Union Objective 2 area, and had a New Deal for Communities project within its boundaries. In 2013 the City Academy Bristol secondary school opened in the area. The Bristol and Bath Railway Path starts in the south of the ward.

Lawrence Hill can be pointed out on the Bristol skyline by its large 1960s tower blocks situated in the area.

== Transport ==
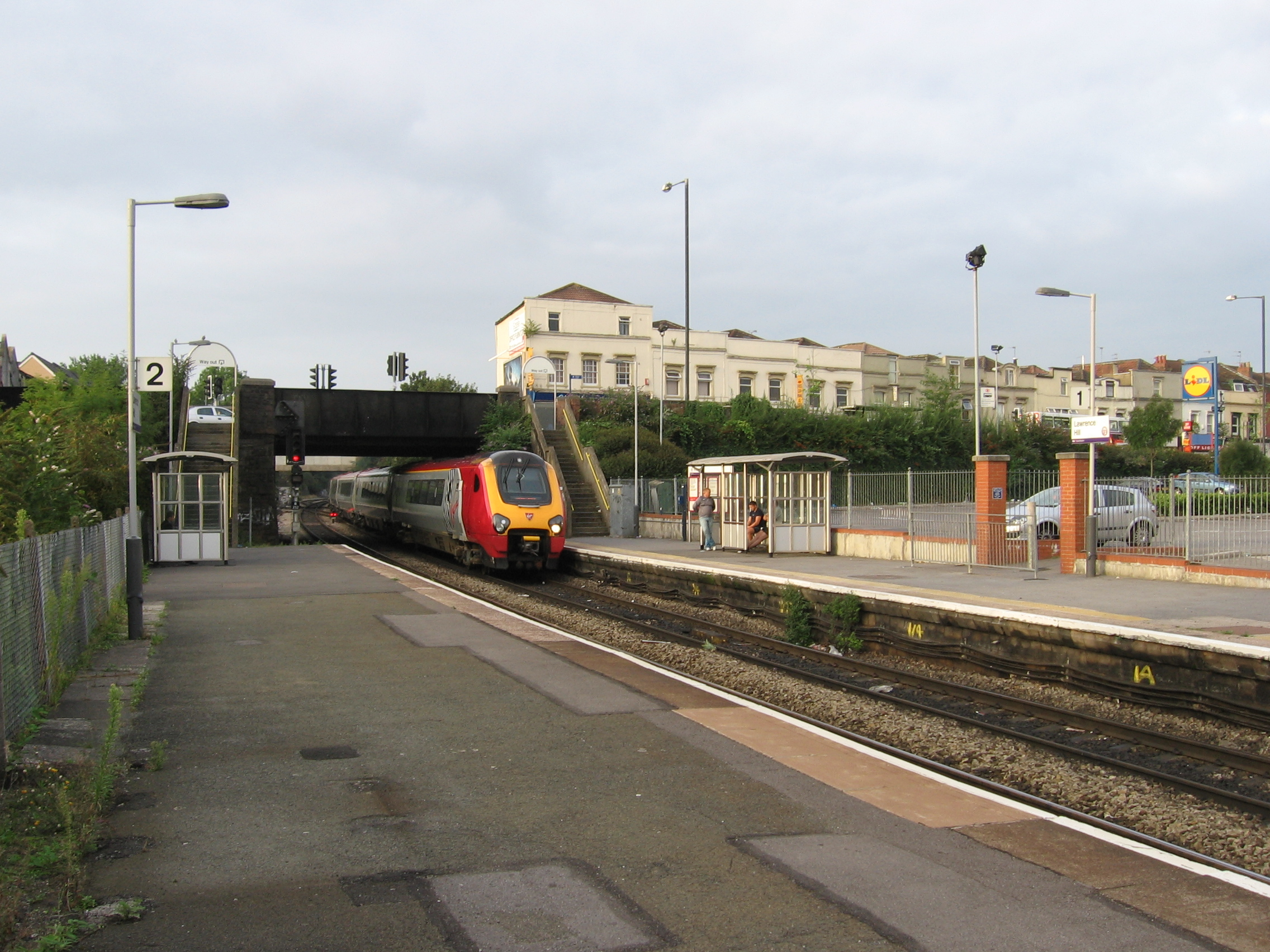
Lawrence Hill railway station

It is served by Lawrence Hill railway station and Stapleton Road railway station in the north-east of the ward, Bristol Temple Meads railway station in the south-west, and buses to Bitton, Keynsham, Kingswood, Longwell Green and Staple Hill.
