= Barton Hill, Bristol =

Coordinates: 51.4525°N 2.5629°W

Barton Hill
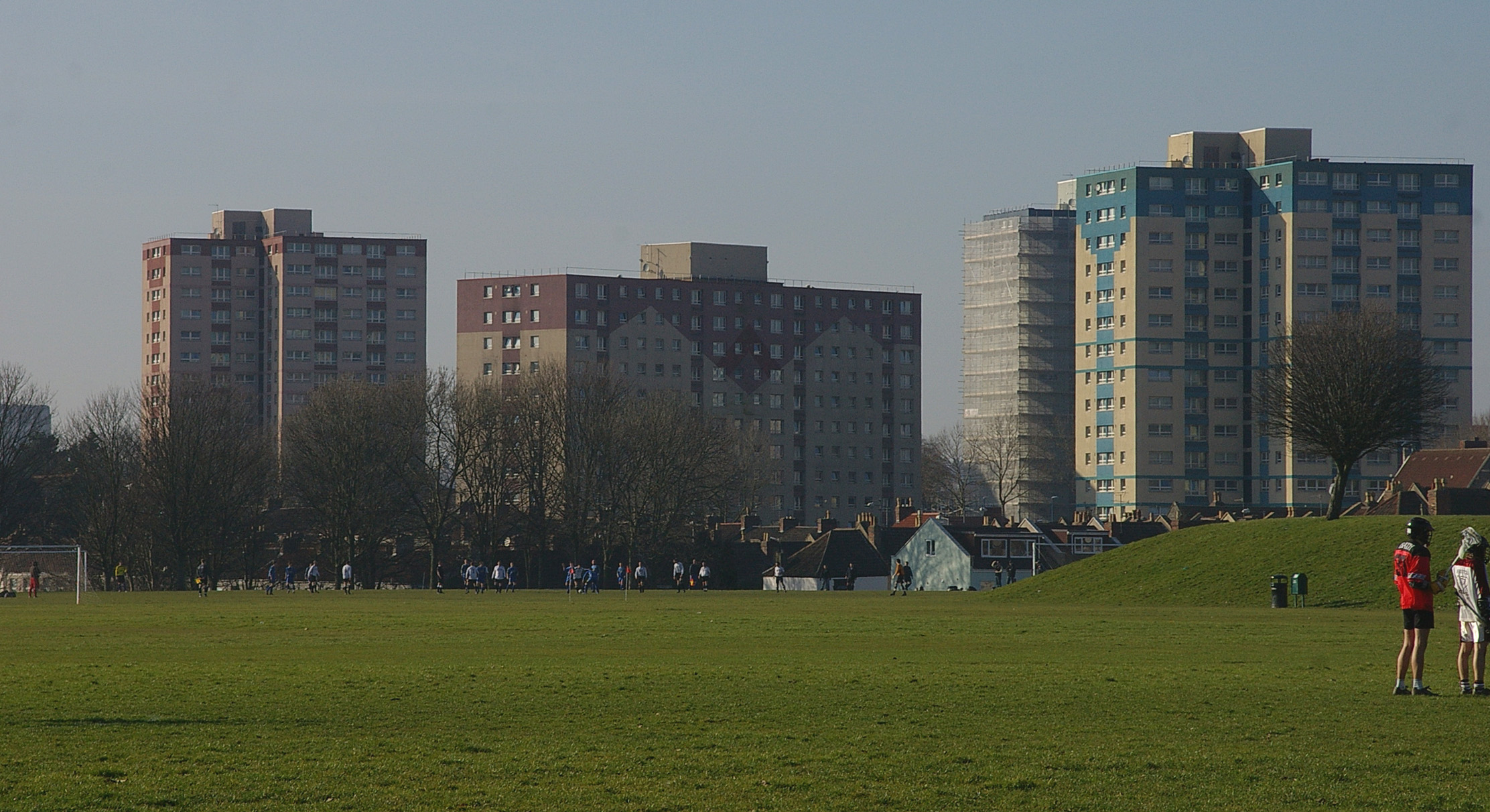
- View of tower blocks in Barton Hill

- Location within Bristol
- OS grid reference: ST609727
- Unitary authority: Bristol
- Region: South West
- Country: England
- Sovereign state: United Kingdom
- Post town: BRISTOL
- Postcode district: BS5
- Dialling code: 0117
- Police: Avon and Somerset
- Fire: Avon
- Ambulance: South Western
- UK Parliament: Bristol East

Barton Hill is an area of Bristol, just to the east of the city centre and Bristol Temple Meads railway station.

It includes residential, retail and industrial premises and is crossed by major roads, railway tracks and the feeder canal leading to Bristol Harbour.

== Geology ==
The solid geology of Barton Hill is Triassic Redcliffe sandstone.

== History ==
Barton was a manor just outside Bristol mentioned in the Domesday Book as Bertune apud Bristov, and later in 1220 as Berton Bristoll. In Saxon and early Norman times the manor was held by the king, and was known as Barton Regis. The manor gave its name to Barton Regis Hundred, the hundred. Sloping ground at the southern end of the hundred, leading down to St Philip's Marsh, became known as Barton Hill. In 1842, the parish church of Saint Luke’s was established.

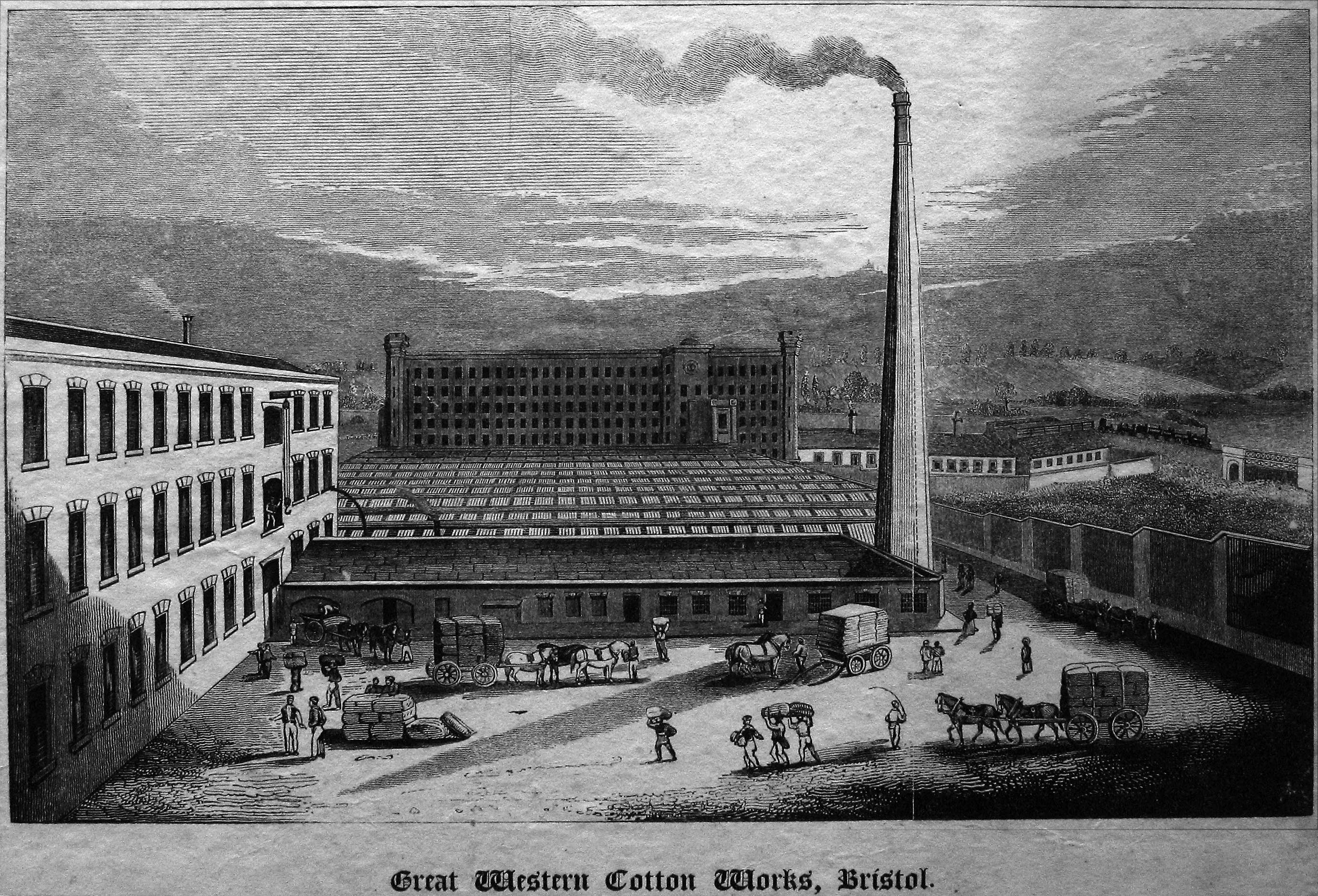
Barton Hill Cotton Mill

The Great Western Cotton Factory on Great Western Lane was designed by Isambard Kingdom Brunel in the early 19th century. Great Western Cotton factory opened in 1838 and closed in 1925. From a plan of 1839 the sheds are seen to have contained up to 1600 looms. The main spinning mill was demolished in 1968.

After World War 2, many homes in Barton Hill, Lawrence Hill, Easton and St. Paul's were destroyed due to being bombed. A large housing estate was built in the area during the 1950s and 1960s to house many of the homeless residents of inner city Bristol. Nine tower blocks and two blocks of maisonettes were constructed during this period of time. The oldest of these, Barton House, opened on 23 July 1958 and is the oldest tower block in Bristol. Many residents of this area and other inner city Bristol areas could not all be housed in these estates and had to be moved to other newly built larger outlying estates such as Southmead, Lawrence Weston, Knowle West and Hartcliffe.

=== Barton House evacuation ===
In November 2023, residents were evacuated from Barton House after a major structural fault was discovered. Bristol City Council said that Barton House was not constructed according to plans and that issues were found with its concrete sections, with the evacuation a precaution to allow for more in depth surveys of the structure. Residents complained that they did not receive enough support following the short-notice evacuation, and held a protest at Bristol City Hall.

== Music ==
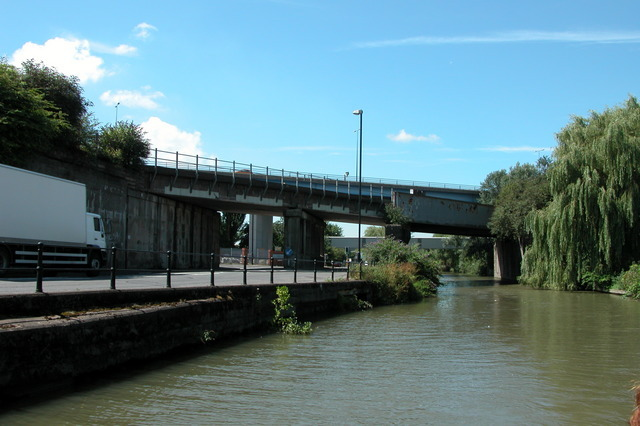
Road and rail bridges crossing the Bristol Harbour feeder canal, Barton Hill, Bristol

- Barton Hill is a stronghold of drum and bass with notable artist and Mercury Prize-winning Roni Size/Reprazent having a studio in the area, with his album Return of V showing Barton Hill on the cover.
- During 1977 and 1978, Barton Hill Youth Centre was a popular venue for punk and new wave acts to play. Among the bands that appeared were Siouxsie and the Banshees, Subway Sect, Slaughter and the Dogs, Adam and the Ants, Cocksparrer, Wayne County and the Electric Chairs and local acts including The Media, The Pigs and The Pop Group. It was probably Bristol's first live punk venue. However escalating violence at the gigs contributed to its short lifespan as a concert venue.

== Arts ==
- In Bristol Studio is an Art and design studio which has been based in the old Cotton Mill on Great Western Lane since 2006. The Cotton Mill has been converted into work space for artists, designers and makers. Also providing workshops for ceramics, printmaking and woodwork.
- Barton Hill Artists are a free collective of locally based artists who specialise in community art activism and community based public installation. Their work includes a 90-foot-long (27 m) mosaic on the Ducie Road railway bridge in the area, and a mural in Gaunts Ham Park, in nearby Lawrence Hill, Bristol.
- The Twisted Pixie, who produces psychedelic art for part of Bristol's psytrance scene, also resides in Barton Hill.
- Travelling Light is a children's theatre company based at Wellspring Settlement, formerly Barton Hill Settlement.
- For Valentine's Day 2020 a Banksy artwork appeared on the side wall of a house in Marsh Lane. Shortly after, it was vandalised.
