= Easton Cowboys and Cowgirls =

Amateur sports and social club in Bristol, England

- Formation: 1992
- Type: Community sports club
- Purpose: Anti-racism, community activism, international solidarity
- Headquarters: The Plough Inn, Easton
- Location: Easton, Bristol, England
- Members: c. 150 to 200
- Website: eastoncowfolk.org.uk

The Easton Cowboys and Cowgirls (also known as the Easton Cowfolk) is an amateur sports and social club based in the Easton area of Bristol, England. Founded in 1992, the club is widely recognised for combining amateur sports with radical left-wing politics, anti-racism, and international solidarity campaigns, and has described itself as "Britain's most intrepid sports club". Operating out of its local base at The Plough Inn pub, the club grew from a single men's football team into an organisation supporting dozens of teams across football, cricket, netball, basketball and other sports.

The club's roots lie in the punk and squatting scenes of Bristol in the late 1980s, when a loose group of players held informal kickabouts, some accounts placing the earliest games in the St Paul's area of the city, before the group settled at Baptist Mills primary school playing field in Easton. It was formalised as a football team joining a local Sunday league for the 1992/93 season. The club's constitution formally commits it to being anti-racist, anti-sexist, anti-fascist, anti-homophobic and anti-transphobic, and academics have characterised it as an example of a "social transformationalist" strand of grass-roots, do-it-yourself football culture that explicitly rejects the commercialisation of sport. Club members and commentators have nonetheless noted that the Cowboys and Cowgirls remains, at its core, a sports and social club rather than a formal political organisation, with only a minority of its wider membership actively engaged in campaigning.

== History ==
=== Origins ===
The club was formed in 1992 by individuals active in Bristol's anarchist, environmentalist, and squatting subcultures, several of whom had previously been involved in anti-fascist organising and the Anti-Poll Tax movement of the 1980s. Seeking to challenge the commercialised and often exclusionary nature of mainstream local sports leagues, the club established an open-door policy welcoming players of all backgrounds and abilities, irrespective of athletic skill. The name "Easton Cowboys" was suggested around the early summer of 1992 by the club's country-music-obsessed secretary and adopted for its blend of self-deprecation and swagger.

A formative moment came in May 1993, when club members were invited, along with the rest of the Cowboys, to a football festival organised by the left-wing German clubs ASV Filderstadt and ICE Neckerstrasse in Stuttgart. The trip introduced the club to a wider European network of similarly minded amateur teams and inspired the Cowboys to organise their own international festival in Bristol the following year. By 1998, this had grown into the "Alternative World Cup", a twenty-team tournament held in the village of Thorncombe, Dorset, which brought over a team of young players from Soweto, South Africa, with the help of £10,000 in matched funding from the trade union UNISON.

=== International tours and solidarity work ===
The Easton Cowboys and Cowgirls became notable for organising high-profile international tours to play exhibition matches in politically volatile or economically marginalised regions worldwide, aiming to build international solidarity through sport under the slogan "Freedom Through Football". Notable international tours include:

- Mexico (1999, 2001 and 2006): The club travelled into the Chiapas highlands to play in tournaments against teams from indigenous autonomous communities aligned with the EZLN, the Zapatista Army of National Liberation. The initial 1999 visit led to the creation of Kiptik, a separate fundraising project that has since raised over £100,000 for clean water and healthcare provision in Zapatista communities.
- Los Angeles (2000): The club's cricket team travelled to Compton to play a two-day test series against the Compton Homies and Popz, a cricket programme built to reduce gang violence, as well as matches against the Beverly Hills Cricket Club and two San Francisco sides. The tour was the subject of a BBC documentary broadcast on BBC1 in the West of England.
- Morocco (2003): the club organised a tour through contacts made via a local Arabic cafe owner in Easton.
- Palestine (2007): The Cowfolk became the first British football team to travel to the West Bank, playing matches against Palestinian teams from Bethlehem, Tulkarem, Hebron and East Jerusalem to protest the Israeli West Bank barrier. The club later declined an offer to play a televised match in Hebron after learning the fixture would be sponsored by a major telecommunications company.
- Brazil (2009): the club played against Los Autonomos, a like-minded anarchist football club from Sao Paulo.
- Argentina (2012): the club took part in the first South American edition of its international network's tournaments.
- Palestine and Lebanon (2010s): the Cowgirls women's football section has continued to tour the region to highlight the situation of Palestinians, including a 2015 tour of the West Bank alongside the Leeds-based club Republica Internationale, and a match in Lebanon in November 2019 intended to draw attention to the movement of Palestinian refugees, following earlier visits to Gaza.

Additionally, the club has organised the "Alternative World Cup", an international anti-racist sports festival drawing grassroots teams from across Europe. In late 2005, some members of the club also helped seed the foundations for the Bristol Radical History Group.

=== Local activism ===
Alongside its international work, the club has taken part in local campaigns in Bristol. In the mid-2000s, it joined local residents in an unsuccessful campaign to prevent Packers Field, a public green space in east Bristol long used by the community, from being enclosed for the construction of an athletics stadium by a local academy school, organising a series of "Community Fun Days" on the site and producing a film documenting the dispute.

The club has also supported individual members in difficulty. In the 1990s it sheltered two asylum seekers from Mozambique who had fled the country's civil war, providing them with a safe house and financial support for around two years before helping them find work in London. In 2014, the club's cricket section campaigned for the release of one of its players, a Pakistani teenager who had spent fifty days in an immigration detention centre while facing deportation, helping the family find legal representation and lobbying its local MP; the player was subsequently released. Following the death of a Cowgirls netball player's teenage daughter from cancer in 2013, the club has continued to fundraise for the Teenage Cancer Trust through sponsored events.

== Structure and governance ==
The club describes itself as non-hierarchical. Its ultimate decision-making body is the mass assembly of its membership, which meets at Full Club meetings held at least twice a year, including an Annual General Meeting in June. Decisions are taken on a one-member-one-vote basis, and day-to-day administration is delegated to a committee comprising a Chair or Co-Chairs, a Treasurer, a Secretary, and a delegate from each section of the club. Officer positions are elected annually, and members may serve a maximum of two consecutive years in the same role, a practice intended to prevent cliques from forming.

Membership is open to anyone involved in promoting, volunteering for, or participating in the club's activities, and there is no membership fee or formal application process. As of the mid-2010s, the club had between roughly 150 and 200 people on its mailing list, of whom around 150 played sport regularly. By the mid-2020s the club's sections included several men's football teams, a women/trans/non-binary football team, three netball teams, a cricket team, a basketball team, a softball team, a children's section (Cowboys and Cowgirls Kids Klub, or CACKK), and a body of former players and non-playing supporters known as the "Legends".

== Political orientation and values ==
The club's constitution formally commits it to being anti-racist, anti-sexist, anti-fascist, anti-homophobic and anti-transphobic, and to furthering "mutual understanding, respect and solidarity for all people" through sport. Academics David Kennedy and Peter Kennedy have placed the club within a broader European tradition of grass-roots football clubs that reject not only the profit motive in sport but also the wider dynamics of commodification associated with neoliberalism. In a review of a 2013 essay collection on left-wing football fan culture, academic Malcolm MacLean cited the club's visits to Palestine and Zapatista territory in Mexico as examples of football fans "asserting their left-wing credentials" in ways he argued were often overlooked by mainstream discussion of the sport.

Club member and writer Will Simpson has, however, argued that the common perception of the Cowboys and Cowgirls as a strictly "political" or "anarchist" club is something of a misconception. Simpson has noted that most of the roughly 150 people on the club's mailing list would describe themselves as apolitical, and that the club's primary purpose remains "to facilitate the playing of sport and, most importantly, to have fun". According to Simpson, the club has no fixed manifesto beyond a shared, non-negotiable commitment to anti-racism and opposition to prejudice, with other matters open to debate.

Writing in Freedom News in 2025, researcher Alice Hoole examined the club's relationship with Republica Internationale of Leeds, arguing that both clubs have provided "a safe home for identities who don't fit the typical sporting trajectory", including women and gender-diverse players who have taken on key organisational roles. Hoole's interviews with club organisers highlighted the informal "communities of care" built around the clubs, including collective childcare and support during illness, alongside their shared history of anti-fascist activism and international solidarity tours to Palestine.

== Association with Banksy ==
During the late 1990s and early 2000s, the Bristol street artist Banksy was an active member of the club, playing in goal for the men's football team before achieving international fame. In January 2001, Banksy joined the club on its second tour of Chiapas. While in Mexico, Banksy painted several stencils and murals throughout the region, including a freehand piece reproducing a well-known photograph by Pedro Valtierra of a Tzotzil woman confronting a soldier, and a mural depicting a hooded Zapatista performing a bicycle kick, both accompanied by the slogans "Zapata Lives" and "To Freedom Through Soccer". He also produced stencils of a soldier with a bird perched on his weapon and a mariachi musician playing a bass guitar resembling nuclear bombs. None of these pieces survive today. Banksy additionally painted a canvas depicting armed Zapatistas wearing branded trainers during a football match beneath looming helicopters, which was later raffled to raise funds for a drinking water project in the community of X'Oyep. Photographs of Banksy at work in Chiapas, later published in the club's history book, are among the only images to show the artist's face, though they were pixelated to preserve his anonymity.

Banksy continued to support the club's fundraising after leaving Bristol. A T-shirt bearing one of his designs, sold in aid of the Kiptik water project, raised around £8,000 over the following decade.

== Reception and scholarship ==
The club's history was documented in Will Simpson and Malcolm McMahon's 2012 book Freedom Through Football: The Story of the Easton Cowboys and Cowgirls, published by Tangent Books. Reviewing the book for the academic journal Socialist Lawyer, Paul Heron described the club as "more than a football club", praising its record of combining a passion for the game with campaigns including anti-fascist organising and support for asylum seekers facing deportation.

Sports sociologists have also examined the club as a case study in grassroots football activism. In two related articles published in Sport in Society and Soccer & Society in 2015, Simpson offered a first-person account of the club's history, arguing that the club is best understood not as an explicitly political organisation but as one whose members' backgrounds in 1980s activism gradually gave it a political character over time. Separately, Kennedy and Kennedy's analysis situated the club within a wider political-economic discussion of resistance to the commodification of football, alongside comparable organisations such as FC United of Manchester and SV Austria Salzburg.
