= Bristol Radical History Group =

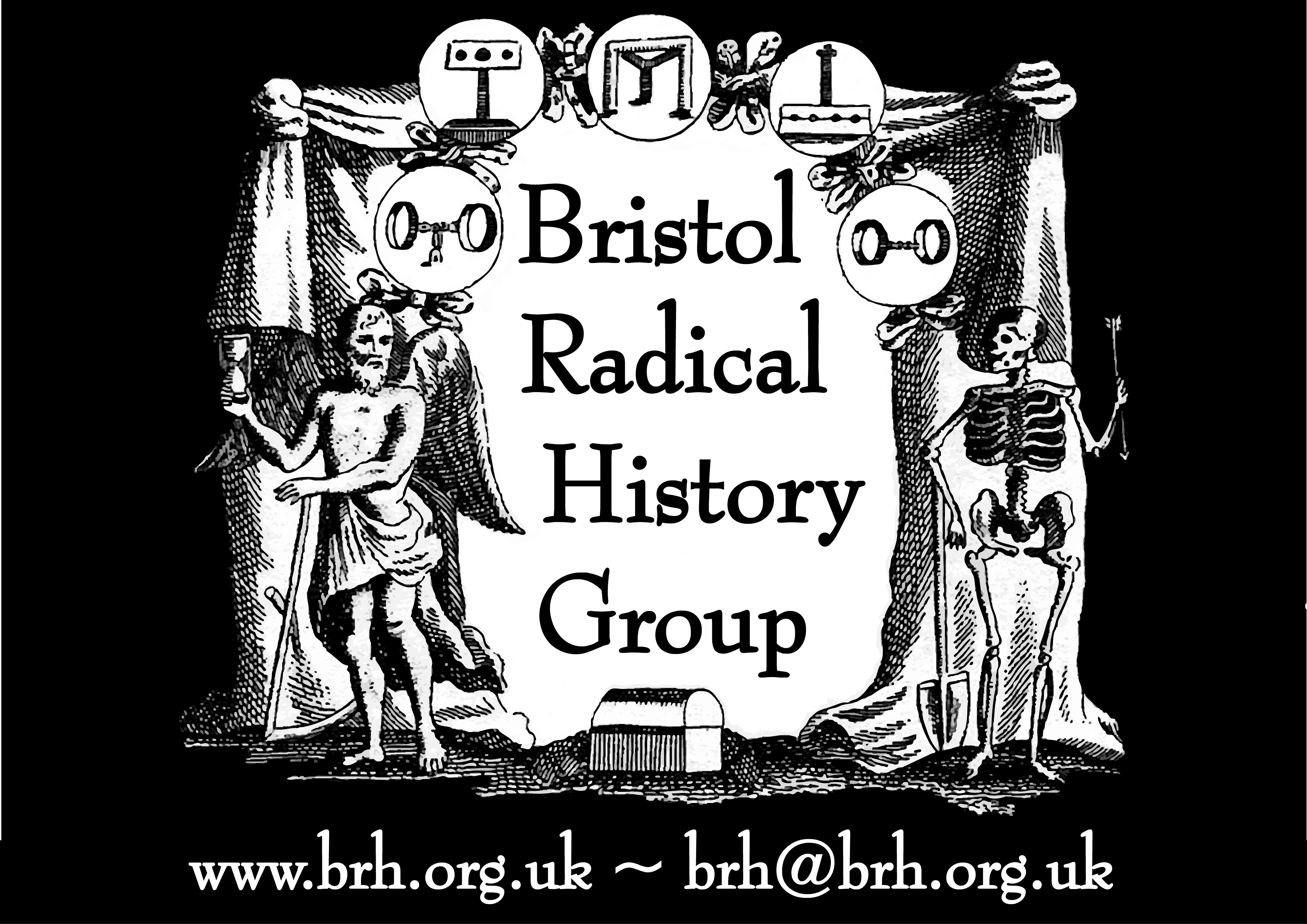
- Bristol Radical History Group featuring Ticket to the hanging of Jonathan Wild
- Abbreviation: BRHG
- Formation: 2006
- Type: Charitable incorporated organisation
- Headquarters: Hotwells, Bristol
- Location: Bristol, England
- Website: www.brh.org.uk

The Bristol Radical History Group was founded in 2006 in Bristol, England. The group aims to promote history-from-below, and was identified by historian Martin Wright as exemplifying a "grass-roots resurgence of labour and people's history." It is a registered charitable incorporated organisation, with charity number 1208797.

== Foundation ==
The Bristol Radical History Group was started by members of the Easton Cowboys and Cowgirls sports club and a local book discussion club. Founding members were concerned that aspects of local social, cultural, political and economic history are often overlooked. They set out to research and share hidden histories in Bristol and the surrounding region. Examples are the trade union movement, women's histories, black, minority ethnic and subaltern histories, environmental histories, social crime, and other histories of struggle. The group also undertakes local community history projects on an amateur basis.

== Publisher ==
The Bristol Radical History Group is a publisher of historical research, mostly relating to Bristol and the West Country. Since 2008, It has published 70 titles within a series known as the Radical Pamphleteer, and other books and reprints. In 2026, a series of eight pamphlets was published to commemorate the centenary of the 1926 General Strike, as a contribution to the national General Strike 100 Project. A repository of teaching materials has been created to promote historical research in the South-West region.

== Projects ==
The Eastville Workhouse Project was set up to identify and memorialise more than 4,000 paupers who were former residents at the Eastville Workhouse and buried in unmarked graves in area.

The project on the Conscientious Objectors in the First World War was a collaboration with the Remembering the Real World War I Group to recognise the 350 men from Bristol and the surrounding area who identified as conscientious objectors, 47 of whom were imprisoned during the course of the 1914-1918 War.

The Bristol Radical History Group undertakes research into the history of slavery. This research was to inform the Countering Colston campaign, with the group supporting the removal of the statue of Edward Colston, according to Marcus Rediker and Rhian Graham, defendant in the Colston Four Trial. Group members have advocated the creation of a memorial to enslaved peoples and abolitionists in central Bristol.

The Bristol Radical History Group has organised the annual two-day Bristol Radical History Festival held at Bristol's M Shed since 2017, and instigated the South Bristol History Festival.
