= Sam Walton (disambiguation) =

Sam Walton (1918–1992) was an American businessman and entrepreneur best known for founding Walmart and Sam's Club.

Sam Walton may also refer to:

- Sam Walton (American football) (1943–2002), American football tackle
- Sam Walton (peace activist), a British Quaker peace activist

== See also ==
- Sam M. Walton College of Business, the business college at the University of Arkansas
- Samuel Robson Walton (born 1944), American billionaire and former chairman of Walmart
