= Sayed Alwadaei =

Bahraini democracy activist

Sayed Ahmed Alwadaei
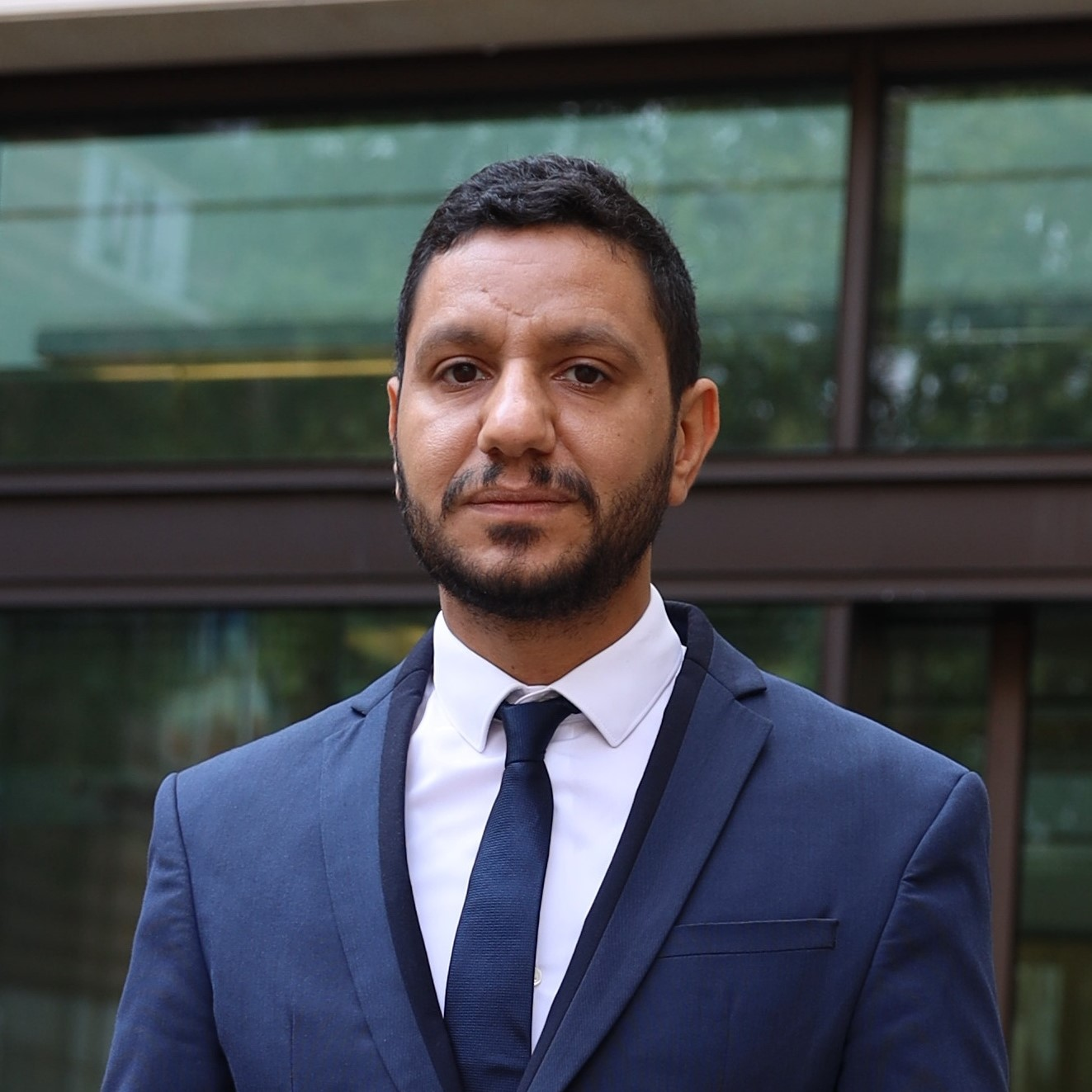
- Alwadaei in 2023
- Born: Bahrain
- Occupation: Human rights activist
- Years active: 2011 – present
- Known for: Director of Bahrain Institute for Rights and Democracy

Sayed Ahmed Alwadaei is director of advocacy at the UK-based Bahrain Institute for Rights and Democracy (BIRD). Alwadaei fled Bahrain and the regime of King Hamad bin Isa Al Khalifa in approximately 2012, establishing refugee status in the UK. In 2015, the Bahrain government stripped him of his nationality, rendering him and his UK-born daughter stateless.

== Biography ==
Alwadaei was involved in the 2011 Arab Spring in Bahrain. As a result, he was jailed and tortured. Alwadaei bears a prominent scar on his forehead, which he told a British Parliamentary Committee is from "the boot of a police officer, who was kicking me while I was on the ground".

Alwadaei's Bahraini citizenship was arbitrarily stripped in 2015, leaving him and his UK-born daughter stateless. In 2016 Alwadaei's wife and infant son were detained in Bahrain as a result of his activism in the UK.

In 2017 Alwadaei was outside of the Bahraini embassy in London when someone from a balcony of the embassy threw boiling water on the protest he was involved in.

In 2017, a Bahraini court sentenced three of Alwadaei's relatives to three years in prison on terrorism charges. The UN called for all three to be released from detention and suggested evidence showed they had been victims of torture and false confessions. Also in 2017, Alwadaei's daughter was born in the UK, but was unable to claim a Bahraini or British passport, with Alwadaei writing for The Guardian that, "She has never owned a passport and cannot leave the country. Her only official form of identification remains her birth certificate."

In 2018, a Bahraini court sentenced his wife to two months in jail in absentia.

In 2023, Alwadaei was arbitrarily detained at Gatwick airport. The home secretary, James Cleverly, has apologised and arranged for compensation to be paid after accepting that this was unlawful.

Alwadaei's British citizenship has been severely delayed by the Home Office, which was condemned by The European Network on Statelessness. The Foreign, Commonwealth and Development Office was revealed to have asked the Home Office to block Alwadaei's application for UK citizenship due to concerns it would affect bilateral relations with Bahrain. In 2024 Alwadaei was finally granted UK citizenship after threatening legal action.

== Human rights activism ==
In 2016 Alwadaei jumped in front of Hamad bin Isa Al Khalifa's car to draw attention to the human rights situation in Bahrain.

Alwadaei has campaigned about Formula One ignoring human rights concerns in Bahrain.

Alwadaei has worked with Campaign Against Arms Trade, notably speaking at the 2015 launch of a campaign, protesting with them at Bahrain's London embassy in 2017 and campaigning against the sale of weapons to Bahrain.

In 2017 Alwadaei was outside of the Bahraini embassy with Sam Walton when someone from within the embassy threw boiling water on the protest he was involved in.

In 2022 Alwadaei gave evidence to the International Trade Committee of the House of Commons of the United Kingdom.

Alwadaei has written numerous opinion pieces highlighting human rights concerns for The Guardian.

== Bob Stewart incident ==
In December 2022, Alwadaei was filmed protesting against British Member of Parliament Bob Stewart as the Conservative Party MP made his way to a reception hosted by the Bahraini embassy in London. Alwadaei challenged Stewart about a previous visit to Bahrain made by the MP and allegedly paid for by the Bahraini government, asking him: "Did you sell yourself to the Bahraini regime?" Stewart responded that Bahrain was "a great place", adding "Go back to Bahrain" and "You're taking money off my country, go away." Stewart later apologised for his remarks, but said he was "taunted" and had not taken money from Bahrain. Alwadaei submitted a letter of complaint to the Conservative Party, alleging that Stewart had brought the party into disrepute and victimised him because of his race or nationality. Following a Metropolitan Police investigation, the Crown Prosecution Service authorised the police to charge Stewart with two offences under section 5 of the Public Order Act 1986, including racially aggravated abuse "and in the alternative, a non-aggravated section 5 offence under the same Act." He retained the Conservative whip following the charges.

On 3 November 2023, Stewart was found guilty of a racially aggravated public order offence, fined £600, and ordered to pay costs. He announced his intention to appeal against the conviction.

Stewart's conviction was overturned in Southwark Crown Court on 23 February 2024.

== Recognition ==
In 2020, Alwadaei was awarded Index on Censorship's 2020 Freedom of Expression Campaigning Award. Alwadaei has been recognised as a human rights defender by Front Line Defenders. Alwadaei has been profiled by human rights organisations such as Redress (charitable organisation) and the International Service for Human Rights.
