= Bristol Crown Court =

Judicial building in Bristol, England

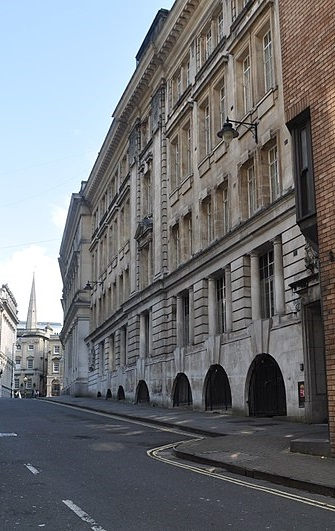
- Bristol Crown Court (the stone building on the right)

- Shown in Bristol
- 51.4548°N 2.5949°W
- Location: Small Street, Bristol

History
- Built: 1868

Site notes
- Architect: James Williams
- Architectural style: Italianate style

The Bristol Crown Court is a Crown Court venue which deals with criminal cases at Small Street in Bristol, England. The building, which was completed in 1868, was previously used as a main post office before it was converted for judicial use in the early 1990s.

== History ==
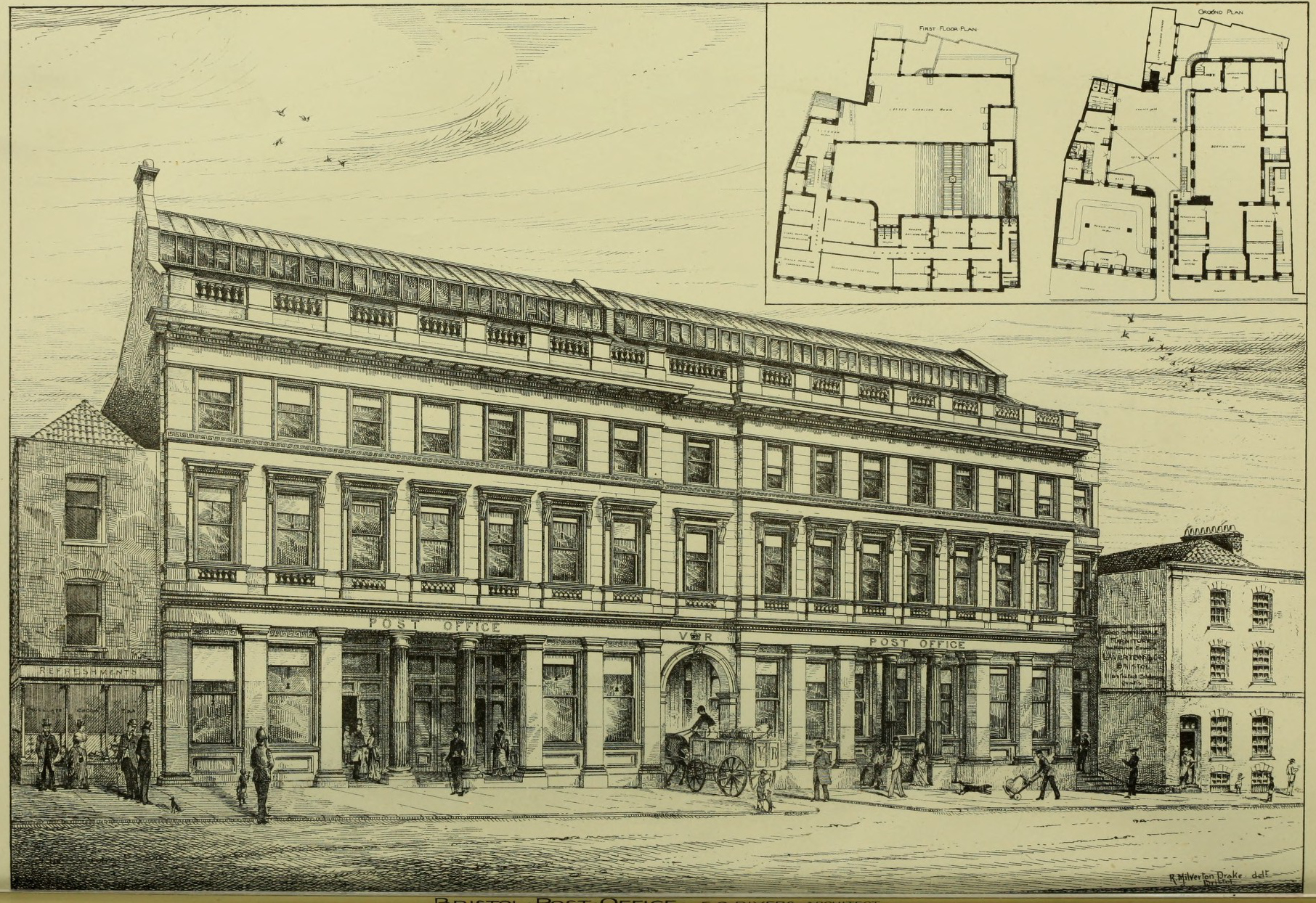
Illustration showing the building in 1890

The site currently occupied by the crown court on the west side of Small Street was originally occupied by a mansion known as "Creswicks", the home of Henry Creswick who was mayor of Bristol from 1660 to 1661. The mansion was acquired by Edward Colston's brother, Thomas, who erected a new house on the site, probably in the early 18th century. The house was demolished in the mid-19th century to make way for a new main post office to replace an earlier main post office which had operated on the southeast side of Cora Street.

The foundation stone for the new building was laid on the 18 February 1867. It was designed by James Williams in the Italianate style, built in ashlar stone and was officially opened on 25 March 1868. The design involved a symmetrical main frontage of fifteen bays facing onto Small Street. The central bay, which was slightly recessed, featured a round headed opening formed by columns supporting imposts, an arch and a keystone. The wings featured central recesses of three bays each containing polished Doric order columns. The other bays on the ground floor were fenestrated by sash windows separated by Doric order pilasters, while the first floor was fenestrated by sash windows with cornices supported by brackets and the second floor was fenestrated by smaller square shaped sash windows. At roof level, there was a cornice and a balustraded parapet. The building was extended to create a new wing, designed by Edward Rivers, for the accommodation of postal staff in 1889. The works provided difficult because they required the demolition of the old cellars of "Creswicks". The building was extended again, to a design by John Rutherford, in 1909.

The building closed as a post office in the 1980s and was converted into a courthouse, to a design by Stride Treglown, between 1989 and 1993. The Crown Court, which had met in the Guildhall on the opposite side of the road, moved into the building in December 1993.

Notable cases at Bristol Crown Court have included the trial and conviction of 15 defendants accused of drugs offences following Operation Julie in the 1970s, the trial and subsequent conviction of Gary Glitter accused of downloading child pornography in 1999 and the trial and subsequent acquittal of four defendants accused of criminal damage in relation to the removal and dumping in the canal of the controversial statue of Edward Colston during a protest in 2020.

== Archives ==
Records of the Bristol Courts of Assizes and the Quarter Sessions, which preceded the Crown Court, are held at Bristol Archives. Bristol Crown Court records from 1972 onwards are held at the National Archives UK.
