= Newham Monitoring Project =

British anti-racism organization

Newham Monitoring Project (NMP) was a grassroots community-based anti-racist organisation in the London Borough of Newham, London, England. Its aim was to provide support work against racial discrimination and violence, police misconduct and around civil rights issues. It provided advice, support, advocacy and a 24-hour emergency helpline to members of the black community facing racism. It undertook community outreach and educational projects and campaign work around issues arising from its casework.

The patron of NMP was the poet and author Benjamin Zephaniah.

== History ==
NMP was formed in 1980 from a community campaign for justice following the murder of a local teenager, Akhtar Ali Baig, in East Ham, East London. NMP's initial purpose was to monitor racist attacks and the response of statutory authorities such as the police or local authority.

Shortly after its formation, the organisation extended its remit beyond monitoring racist attacks to include reports of police harassment and misconduct within the local the black community. NMP began documenting case examples and published yearly reports that argued the existence of institutional racism and how this in turn shaped what it perceived as the societal criminalisation of black people. It also aligned with a series of community campaigns which claimed to be for progressive social change and justice, such as the right to self-defence by members of the black community in response to racist attacks.

In 1983, NMP initiated a 24-hour emergency helpline run by trained volunteers to provide immediate assistance to people with complaints of racial violence.

Although self-organisation of black communities was central to its founding aims, it worked with white people who defined as 'anti-racists' in order to align its work with wider demands for social justice.

NMP was associated with justice campaigns such as those of the Newham 7 and Newham 8, Stephen Lawrence and many involving deaths in police custody such as Ibrahima Sey and Shiji Lapite. It also worked alongside many other organisations working with the black community such as Newham Asian Women's Project, Southall Black Sisters and the United Friends and Families Campaign, other organisations within the anti-racist movement such as the Institute of Race Relations and Campaign Against Racism and Fascism (CARF) as well as organisations working on a broader level for justice such as INQUEST.

NMP closed in September 2016 due to lack of funds.

NMP was one of only a small number of independent community organisations providing specialist casework support around racial discrimination in the UK. Research indicates that independent community groups provide avenues of support not available from racial equality councils, housing departments or police, to the black community to combat racist incidents.

The organisation publicly argued racism remains rooted in the fabric of British society, as shown by the recent anti-terrorism legislation and stop and search powers, which disproportionately affect black communities. It maintained that the experiences of its individual cases reflect the broader reality of racism, therefore campaigns rooted in this way have a real base within the black community and are able to mobilise support in a way that high-profile but largely media-focused campaigns cannot.

NMP has supported other active campaigns such as that led by the family of Jean Charles de Menezes, an innocent Brazilian man shot to death by police in 2005 during an anti-terror operation for which no individual officer has ever been charged.

It has worked with the families involved in the near fatal 2 June 2006 Forest Gate raid, standing alongside the local community in condemning the actions of the police and calling for a full and fair independent investigation and for officers to be held accountable. NMP worked with a number of other local organisations to organise a demonstration about this issue on 18 June 2006.

NMP submitted a report to the Metropolitan Police Authority criticising the Metropolitan Police Service's media and communications handling of this incident.

In 2009, NMP were one of the founding member of Netpol: The Network for Police Monitoring.

Other projects included involvement in organising discussion based events for the local community alongside Newham Bookshop with authors such as Moazzam Begg, Rageh Omaar, Gary Younge, Jocelyn Hurndall, who is the mother of Tom Hurndall, and Clive Stafford Smith to highlight related issues of public concern that engage with similar themes of the organisation's work around racism, human rights, policing and justice.
