= Lawrence Hoo =

British poet of African descent

Lawrence Hoo (born January 17, 1969) is a poet, educator, and activist residing in Bristol. He is a published author of many books of poetry including Inner City Tales in 2006, HOOSTORY in 2011, and CARGO in 2019.

== Early life ==
Hoo was born in Birmingham in Queen Elizabeth Hospital Birmingham. After a youth spent growing up in and out of care, he embarked on a career in poetry and activism. Settling in the areas of Easton, Bristol and Saint Paul's, he has been active in communities within Bristol for many years.

== Published works and appearances ==
Hoo published his first collection of poetry dealing with a variety of issues in the city of Bristol in 2006. This collection highlighted a number of issues, including a Red-light district being outside a Primary school in Bristol, and the housing by Bristol City Council of known paedophiles next to a nursery school in Bristol. These issues were also filmed in a series of YouTube videos. Hoo has published a number of other videos covering a range of topics including drug-addiction and prostitution.

In 2011 he published Hoostory, another collection of poetry. Most recently in 2019 he has published CARGO - which stands for Charting African Resilience Generating Opportunities. Hoo is very active in spoken word poetry and a number of videos of him carrying out this work are available at events such as numerous poetry festivals and on Ujima Radio reading a poem called "Ship Over Troubled Water" about Windrush in 2019. He also appeared on the BBC documentary Enslaved (TV series), with Samuel L. Jackson and Afua Hirsch. In 2022 he interviewed John Barnes at the Forwards Festival in Bristol. Hoo also, in collaboration with Charles Golding, produced an exhibit called Jewels of St Paul's which was "a mixed media piece set in the ground floor windows of the Moxy Bristol Hotel. Four jewelled shapes are cut into the windows, overlaid with a poem dedicated to St Paul's and its people." In 2020 Hoo launched, with CARGO in association with the University of Bristol, an interactive digital platform called Universal City connecting new students and staff with the diversity of the city of Bristol. Hoo recently appeared at a pro-Palestine march in the city of Bristol and read a poem in support of a cease fire.

== Recognition ==
In 2016 Hoo was invited to be Ujima radio's poet in residence and in 2018 was awarded a MTM Award for services to Music, Arts and Culture and a RISE Award for services to Community, Arts and Entertainment. In 2021 he was on The Bristol Cool list and the Bristol Power List in 2020. In 2022 Hoo was awarded an honorary doctorate from the University of Bristol.

== Activism ==
Hoo is an activist on a number of issues affecting his city and marginalized communities. He founded CARGO, which stands for Charting African Resilience Generating Opportunities in 2019. This is an online multi-media platform that includes classroom lesson plans, particularly catering for pupils of African descent on a range of topics including the history of Queen Nzinga, Nanny of the Maroons and Dutty Boukman. These lesson plans are designed to empower and tell the stories of those of African descent, looking beyond the narratives of slavery. CARGO has also produced a film charting the St Paul's Uprising (often wrongly called a riot) in 1980, for which Hoo was the executive producer. CARGO is supported by a number of notable people including the academic and sociologist Jason Arday and the Bristol-based band Massive Attack. The platform and Hoo featured in a BBC documentary 'We Are England' in 2022 and an article in The Guardian.

In 2022 he featured in a documentary film "I am Judah", at the Encounters Film Festival. This film is about an Easton community elder 'Ras' Judah Adunbi. In 2017, police mistook Ras Judah for a crime suspect and was brutally tasered in the face while he was walking his dog, a story which was covered by the national press including support from Hoo.

Over many years he has spoken out in his local community about a range of issues including a fire at a playground in St Paul's, the fact that Avon and Somerset police had upheld only 1% of complaints against them. In 2017 Hoo made national news when he took it upn himself to pick up used needles in a local park. He also spoke out in the national press when a statue of the black poet Alfred Fagon was defaced with bleach.

Hoo has spoken on the radio about a number of issues including on BBC Radio 4 about race, about his work on CARGO with the BBC, with The Times on Black Lives Matter, with Chatham House on reflections on Black Lives Matter, with ITV on the toppling of the Statue of Edward Colston on 7 June 2020.

In 2022 Hoo read one of his poems at the funeral of the civil rights activist Roy Hackett.

Hoo has been very active in supporting pro-Palestine groups and highlighting the atrocities taking place in Gaza. He took part and read poetry at an event that targeted Elbit Systems UK in Bristol and was a co-signatory to an open letter condemning the Arnolfini International Centre for Contemporary Arts of "censorship of Palestinian culture".
