= St Peter and St Paul, Bristol =

Greek Orthodox church in Bristol, England

Church of St Peter and St Paul
- The Greek Orthodox Church of St Peter and St Paul
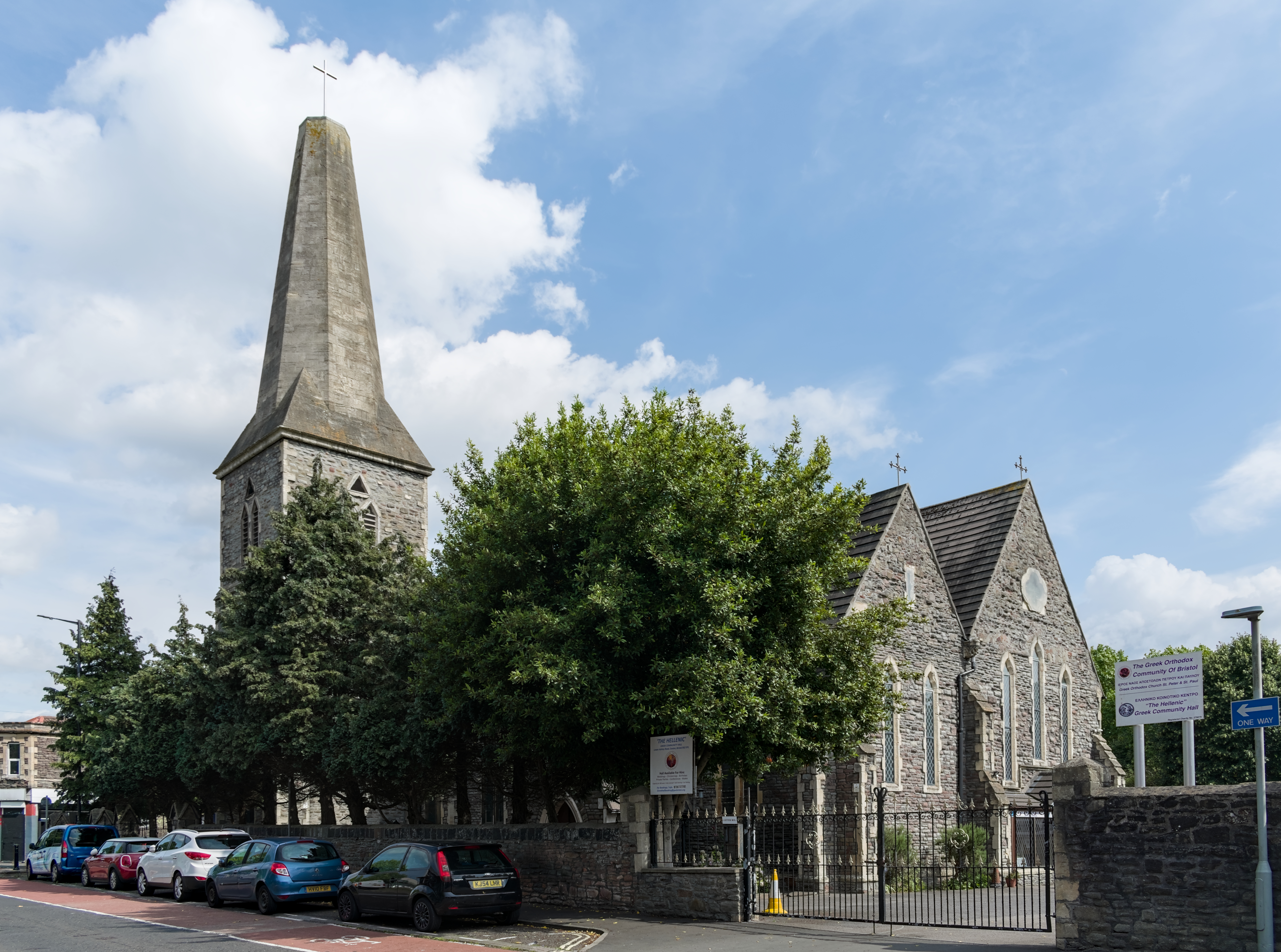
- Church of St Peter and St Paul
- 51.465491°N 2.572850°W
- Location: Easton, Bristol, England
- Denomination: Greek Orthodox Church
- Previous denomination: Church of England
- Website: https://www.greekcommunitybristol.org.uk/

History
- Status: Active
- Dedication: Simon the Apostle (1847–1963); Saint Peter and Paul the Apostle (1963–present)
- Consecrated: 21 December 1847 (St Simon's); 29 September 1963 (SS Peter and Paul)

Architecture
- Architect(s): S. J. Hicks and S. B. Gabriel
- Style: Gothic Revival
- Groundbreaking: 18 June 1846
- Construction cost: £3,165

Administration
- Diocese: Greek Orthodox Archdiocese of Thyateira and Great Britain

St Peter and St Paul is a Greek Orthodox church located on Lower Ashley Road in the Easton area of Bristol, England. Designed in the Gothic Revival style by S. J. Hicks and S. B. Gabriel, the building was completed in 1847 as the Anglican Church of St Simon the Apostle. It was established to serve the rapidly growing and impoverished population of Baptist Mills.

Following the merger of the Anglican parish with St Agnes in 1959, the vacant building was acquired by the local Greek and Greek-Cypriot community, which had expanded significantly after World War II. Consecrated in 1963, it became the first permanent Greek Orthodox church in the West Country. It is the principal Greek Orthodox congregation in southwest England under the Greek Orthodox Archdiocese of Thyateira and Great Britain.

== History ==
=== St Simon's Church (1847–1960) ===
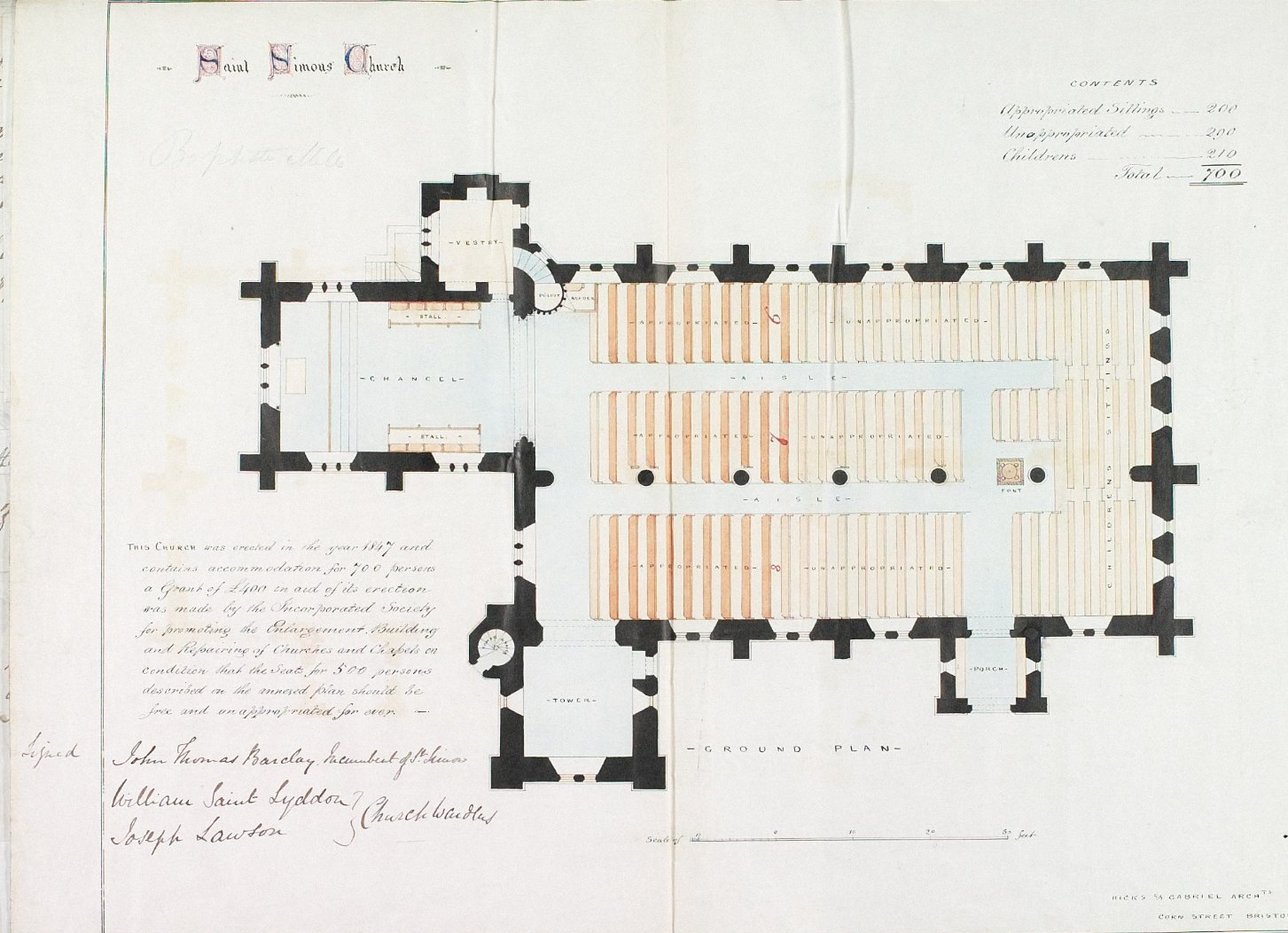
The floorplan of St Simon's Church by Hicks & Gabriel, 1847

The site upon which the church stands, near Baptist Mills, was originally agricultural land. A document from March 1804 records the sale of this plot to a consortium, including Isaiah Sturge and Thomas Walker, who intended to erect a flour mill to aid the poor during a period of high wheat prices. The land remained in the hands of the Sturge family until it was acquired for the church's construction.

In the mid-1840s, the area was constituted as a new ecclesiastical district under the Sir Robert Peel's Act, carved out of the populous Trinity district of St Philip and Jacob. Contemporary reports described the new parish of roughly 2,200 people as being "poor and densely populated," and the first incumbent, Rev. J. T. Barclay, struggled to accommodate the congregation in a temporarily licensed schoolroom.

The foundation stone was laid on 18 June 1846 by the Lord Mayor of Bristol, John Kerle Haberfield, following a service at Trinity Church. A bottle containing silver coins and a commemorative copper plate were deposited beneath the stone. The ceremony featured a sermon by Rev. Peter Hall, who used the opportunity to denounce the Oxford Movement (Puseyism) as a "canker" on Christianity. Construction proved difficult and expensive due to the unstable, sandy ground of the area. This meant that the foundations required significantly more funding than initially estimated, forcing the building committee to issue urgent appeals to avoid leaving the structure incomplete. Despite a funding shortfall of £500 by the time the roof was being installed, the church was successfully consecrated by the Bishop of Gloucester and Bristol on 21 December 1847.

The new parish continued to struggle with poverty throughout the Victorian and Edwardian eras. In 1851, the incumbent noted that the local population could not afford to contribute to the expenses of public worship, and by 1863, appeals were being made to the wider city to help the parishioners survive the winter. The location also suffered from environmental challenges; in 1870, the Vicar, Rev. Cornelius Witherby, formally petitioned the city to address the periodic flooding of the River Frome which frequently inundated the area. By 1913, the population had risen to nearly 5,000, yet the church funds were "entirely exhausted", and the parish as a whole still impoverished. A visit by the Bishop of Bristol in December 1914 highlighted the urgent need for a parish hall, a facility the parishioners struggled to afford.

In 1959, the parish was merged with St Agnes, leaving St Simon's vacant. It was subsequently offered to the Greek Orthodox community, following an abandoned proposal to acquire Christ Church before its congregation prevented its redundancy.

=== Greek Orthodox Church (1960–present) ===
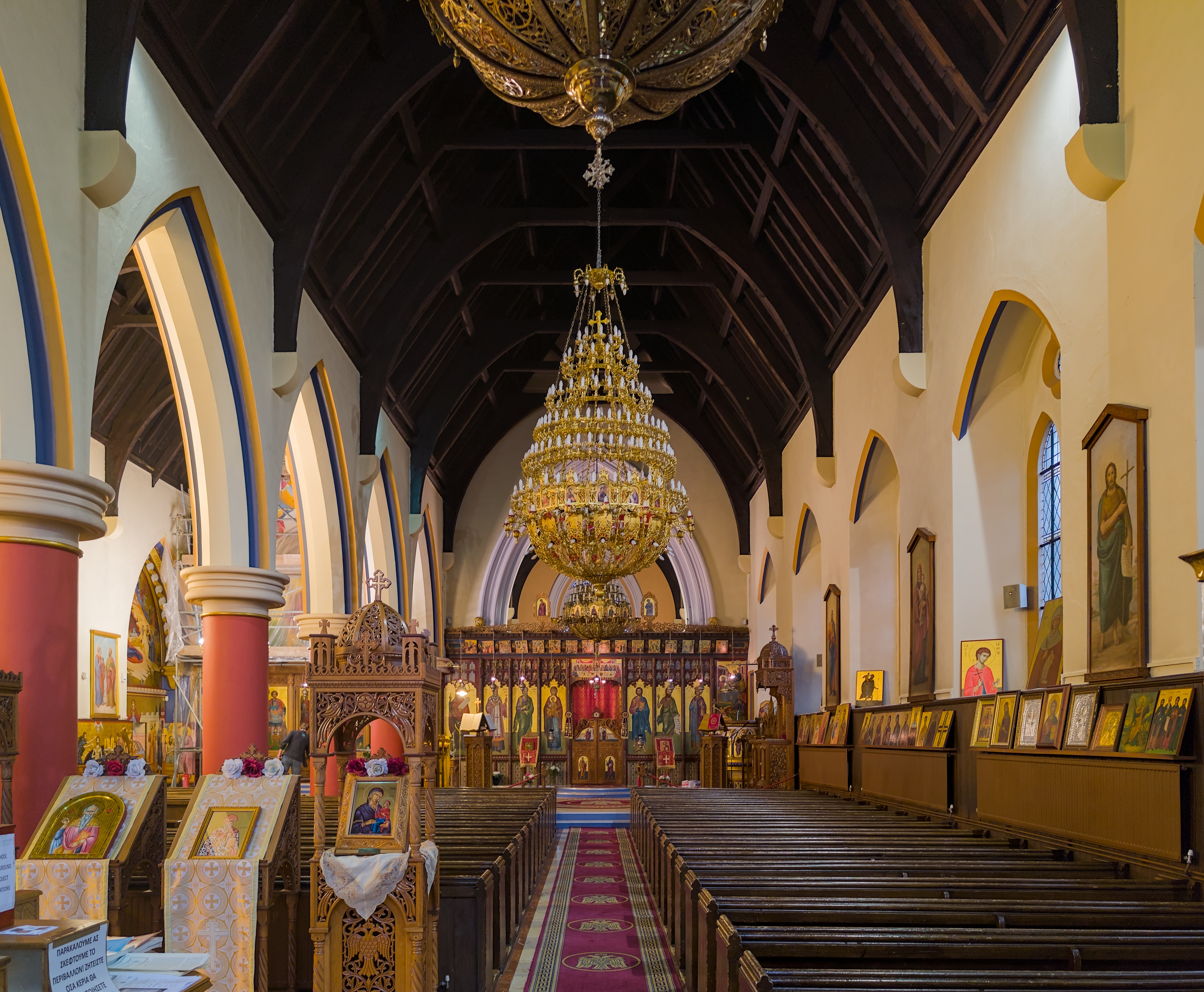
View of the nave, looking west to east

Although Greek sailors and merchants had established a presence in Bristol during the 19th century, a permanent community only solidified following World War II. For several years the congregation lacked a dedicated place of worship, relying on sporadic services in borrowed Anglican churches such as St Barnabas in Knowle or making difficult journeys to the nearest Orthodox church in Cardiff.

The search for a permanent home culminated in 1960, when the community secured a lease for the vacant St Simon's Church from the Bishop of Bristol. This was followed by the appointment of the community's first permanent priest, Archimandrite Eirinaios Athanasiades, in 1958. Three years after taking up residence, the building was formally consecrated for Orthodox use on 29 September 1963. The dedication ceremony was led by the Bishop of Apameia and attended by the Bishop of Bristol, Oliver Tomkins; during the service, ancient relics brought from Constantinople were sealed into the altar, marking the foundation of the first permanent Greek Orthodox church in the West Country. An investiture ceremony was held at the church shortly after its inauguration, where long-serving members were honoured with titles from the Ecumenical Patriarchate of Constantinople.

The fabric of the church was gradually restored and adapted by the congregation. In the mid-1960s, the priest Rev. Thomas Tsevas was noted in the local press for personally painting the exterior stonework and railings to maintain the building's appearance. The freehold of the church was eventually purchased by the community in 1978 for £12,500. The following year saw the arrival of Father George Nicolaou, under whose tenure the church was registered as a charity (No. 279079). The site was subsequently expanded through the acquisition of neighbouring properties, including the opening of new church gardens in 1993, attended by William Waldegrave MP, and the construction of a community hall in 1999 funded by a £193,000 National Lottery grant.

== Architecture and fittings ==
=== Exterior ===
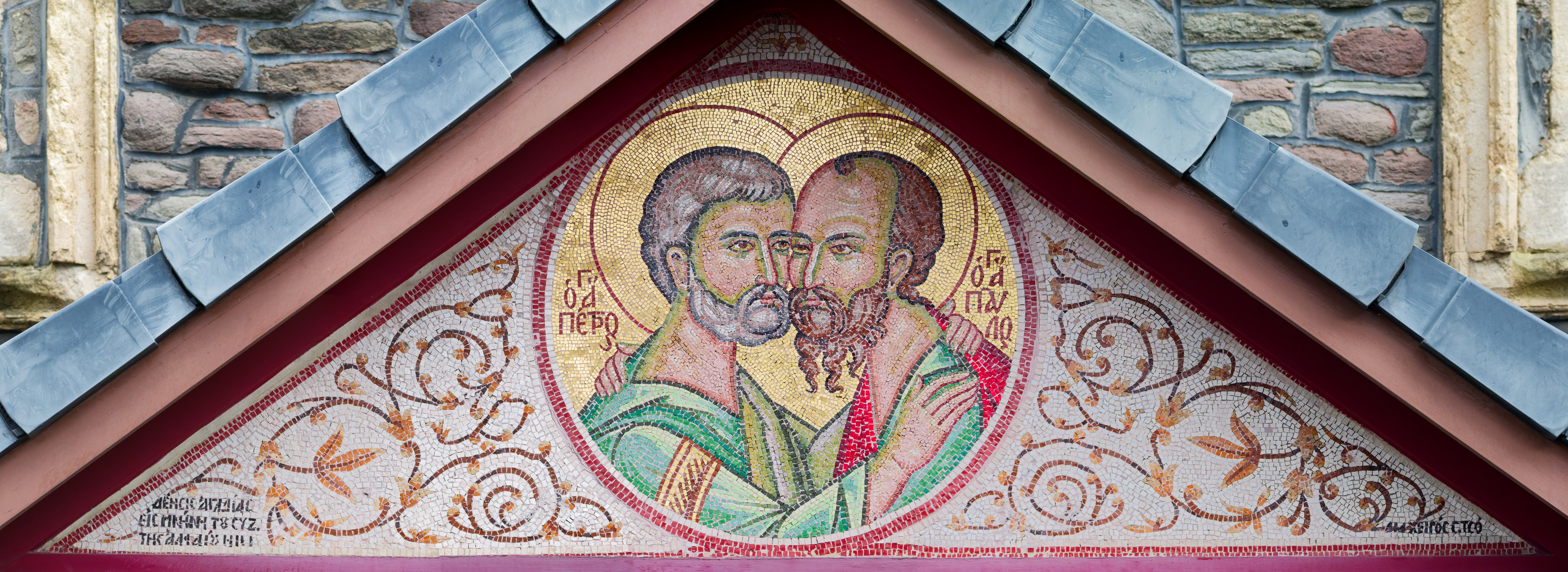
Mosaic tympanum above the entrance, depicting the current patron saints. The Greek inscription on the left reads: "Prayer and donation of Irene and her husb[and] Zisis". The artist's signature on the right reads: "By the hand of G. Tso[lakis]".

The church was designed by S. J. Hicks and S. B. Gabriel in an early 14th-century Gothic Revival style and constructed out of Pennant stone with freestone dressings. The layout consists of a nave, a north aisle divided by six arches with circular piers, a chancel 30 feet deep, and a north porch. Following the construction of the M32 motorway and the Outer Circuit Road in the late 1960s and 1970s, which necessitated the razing of nearby streets and the church of St Gabriel, St Peter and St Paul now overlooks the motorway's Junction 3 roundabout.

A prominent feature of the church is the tower and spire, located at the east end of the north aisle due to the cramped nature of the original Victorian site. The spire was originally designed to reach a height of 121 feet (37 m). However, in later years, the structure became unsafe. Unable to finance a complete rebuild, the Greek community opted to shorten the spire, capping the remaining stump with a distinctive silver orb and cross.

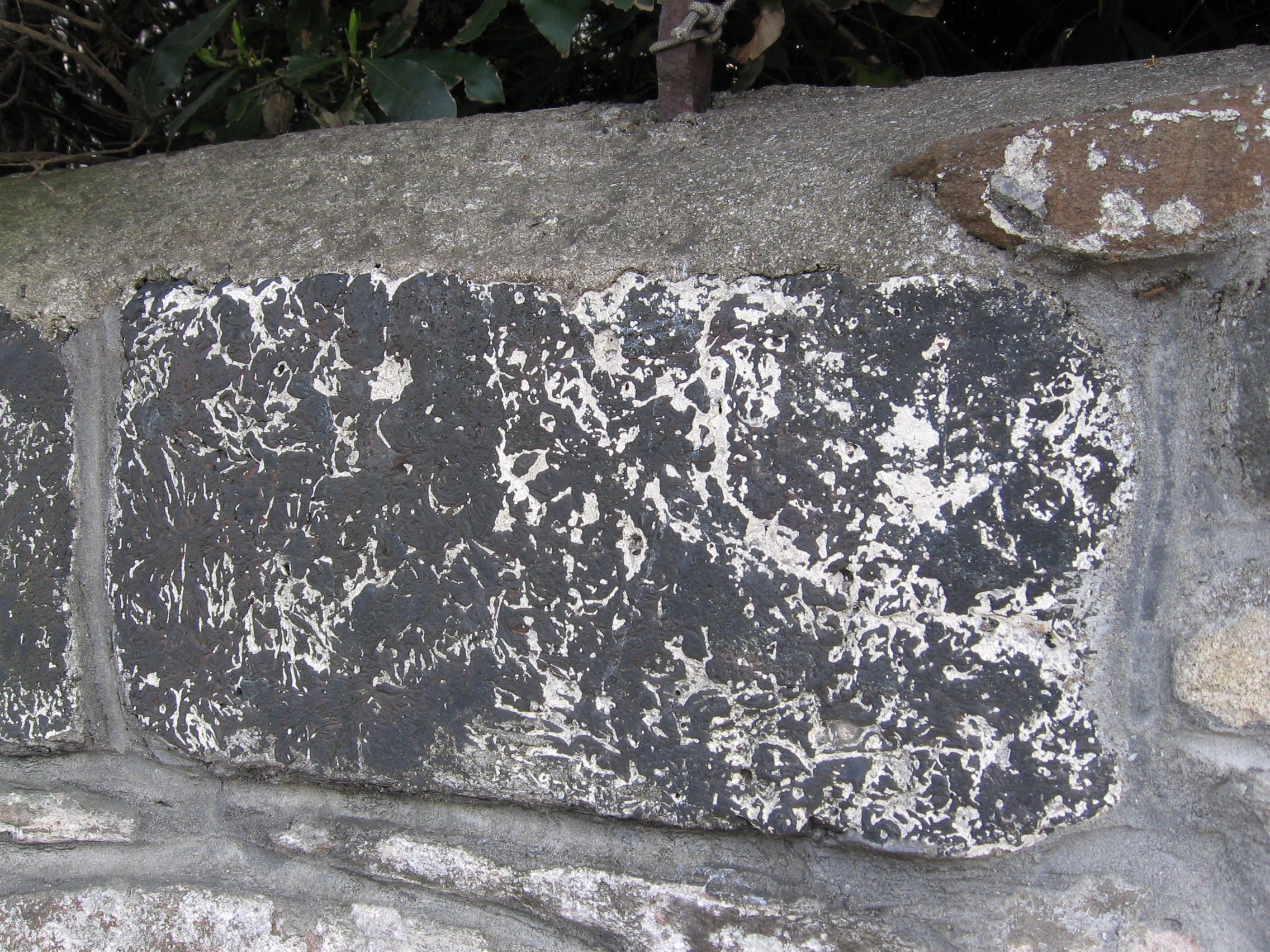
One of the copper-slag coping blocks in the churchyard wall

Distinctive to the site is the churchyard boundary wall, which is capped with blocks made of copper-slag. This dense, industrial byproduct of the neighbouring Baptist Mills Brass Works was a common construction material in the locality, with a similar type of material used in the construction of the nearby Black Castle Public House.

=== Interior ===
The original pulpit remains in situ. The original chancel screen has been retained and adapted into an iconostasis, with the former openings infilled with panels now painted with icons of Christ, the Virgin Mary, Saint Andrew, Saint John the Baptist, Saint Simon, and Saint Barbara, to screen the sanctuary from view. The baptistery and font were designed by W. Tate of London and dedicated to Richard Coombe. It was formerly surrounded by iron screens of Messrs. E. and F. Edbrook and opened on 8 February 1891. An organ was also present in the church during its Anglican years, later being moved and rebuilt by Daniel & Co. of Clevedon in St Mary Magdalene with St Francis Church in Lockleaze. After the demolition of that church, it was moved to St Helen's Church, Alveston.

There are two figurative stained-glass windows in the church, installed in simple plate tracery. The east window was unveiled on Easter Day 1872 and depicts the Crucifixion, the Adoration of the Shepherds, and the Appearance of Christ to Mary Magdalene. A war memorial window was dedicated in September 1922 by the Archdeacon of Bristol. Located on the north side, the two-panel window represents St Michael and St George and commemorates the "Old Boys" of the parish school who died in World War I, as well as Christopher Robinson, a headmaster of 27 years.

Since 1960, the interior has been enriched with Byzantine style fittings. These include a carved wooden episcopal chair, extensive iconography, and chandeliers embellished with icons and intricate metalwork.

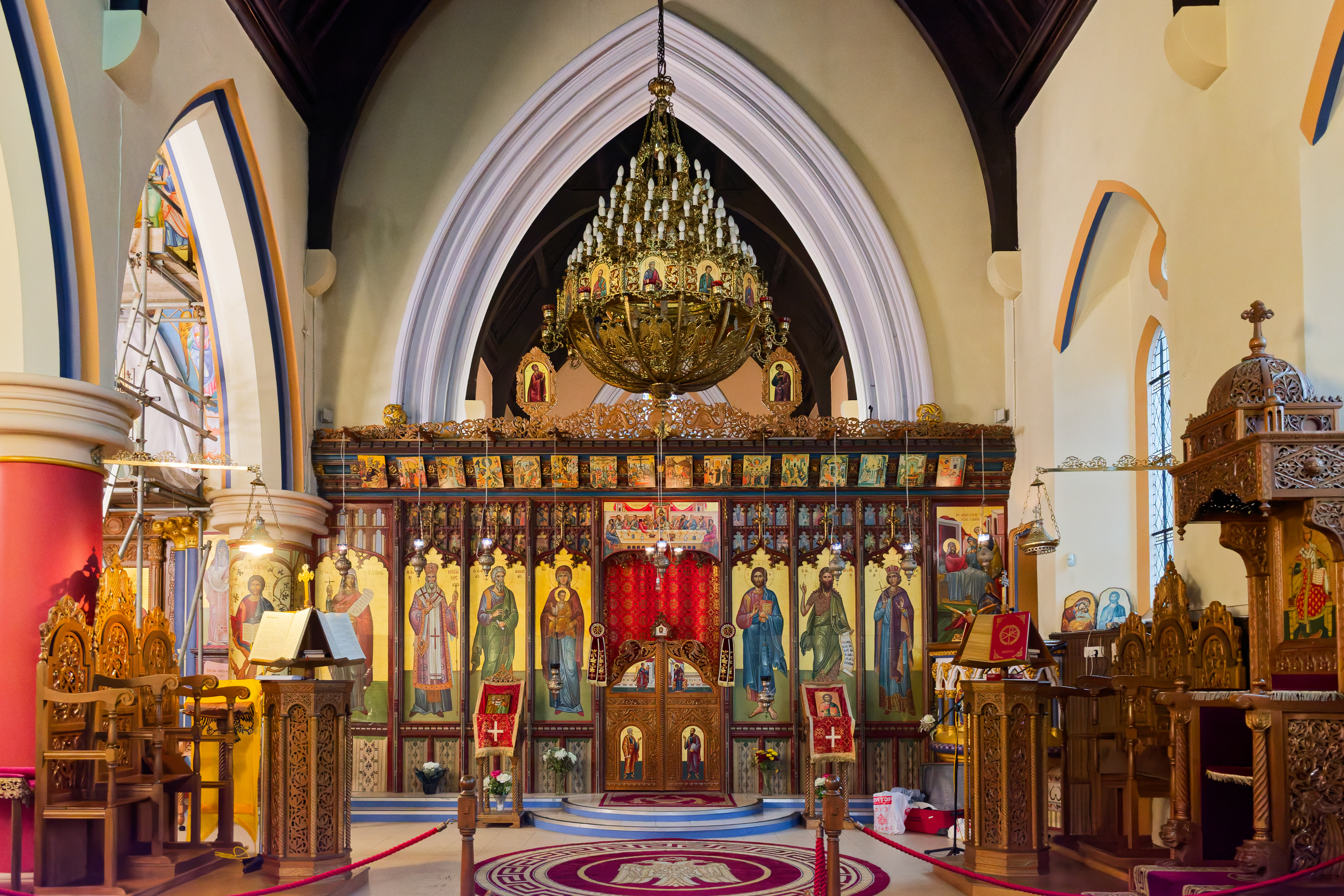
The present altar made from a former screen

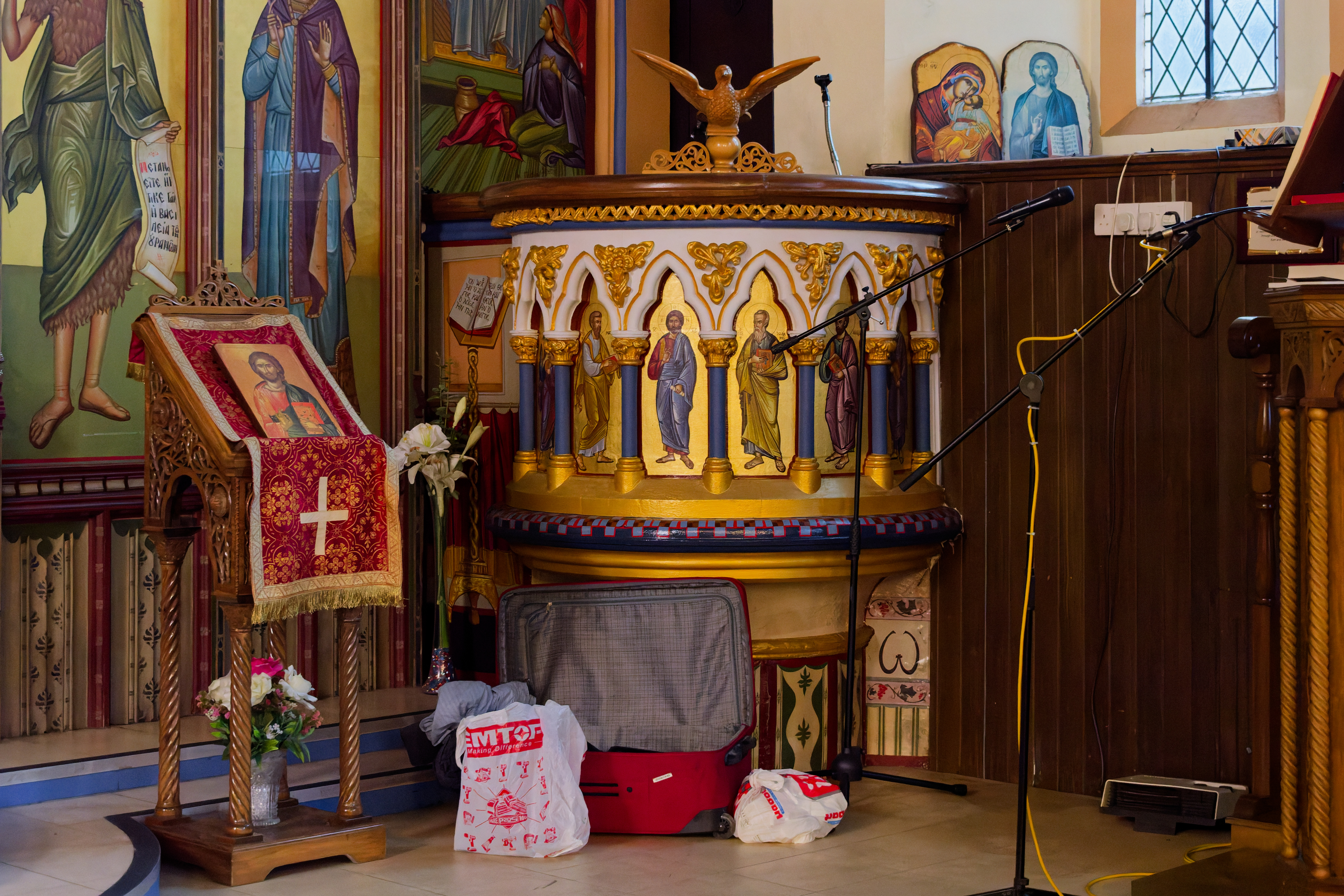
The pulpit, original but now decorated with icons

East window

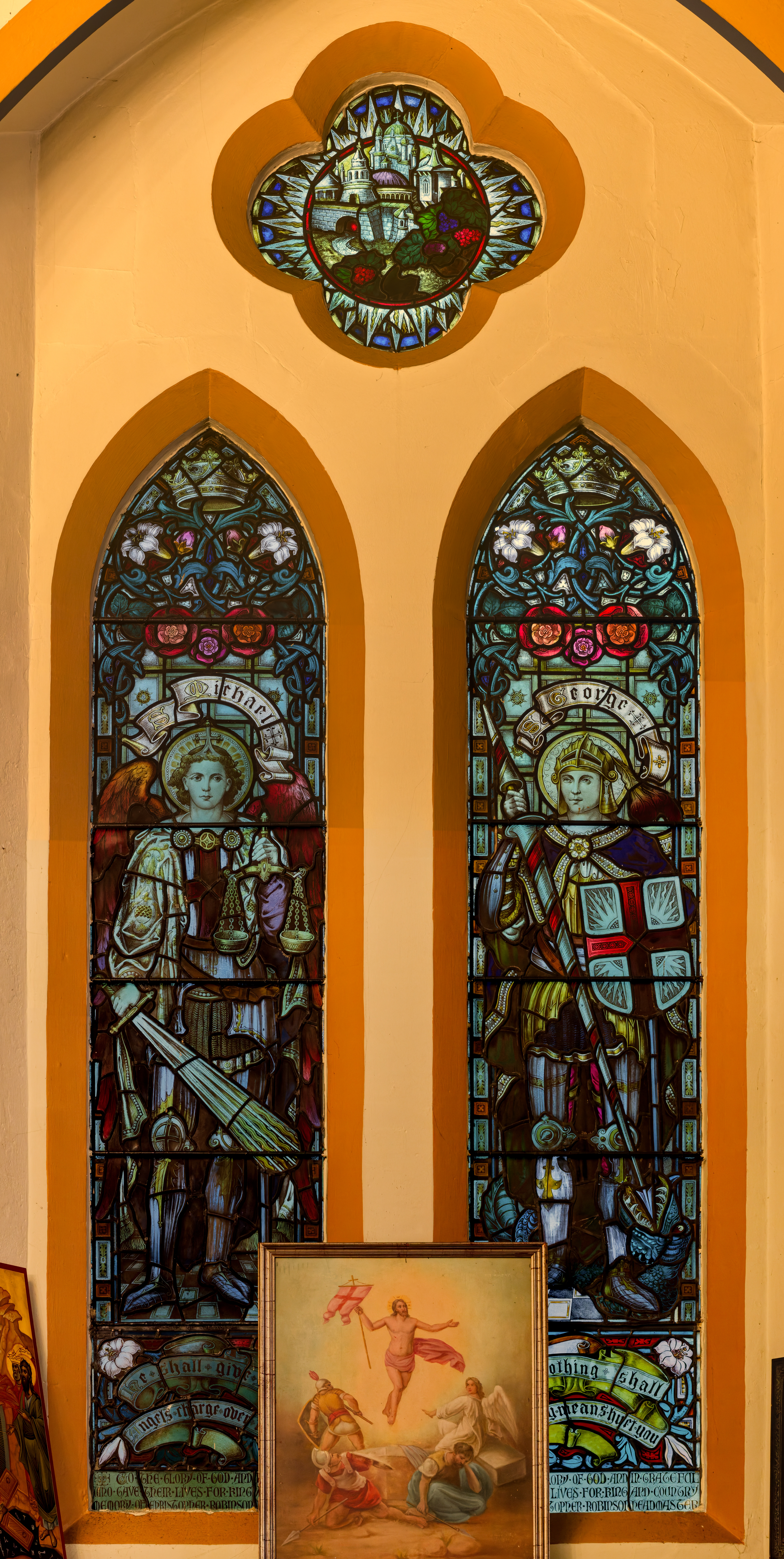
Stained-glass window dedicated to Christopher Robinson and the St. Simon's Old Boys

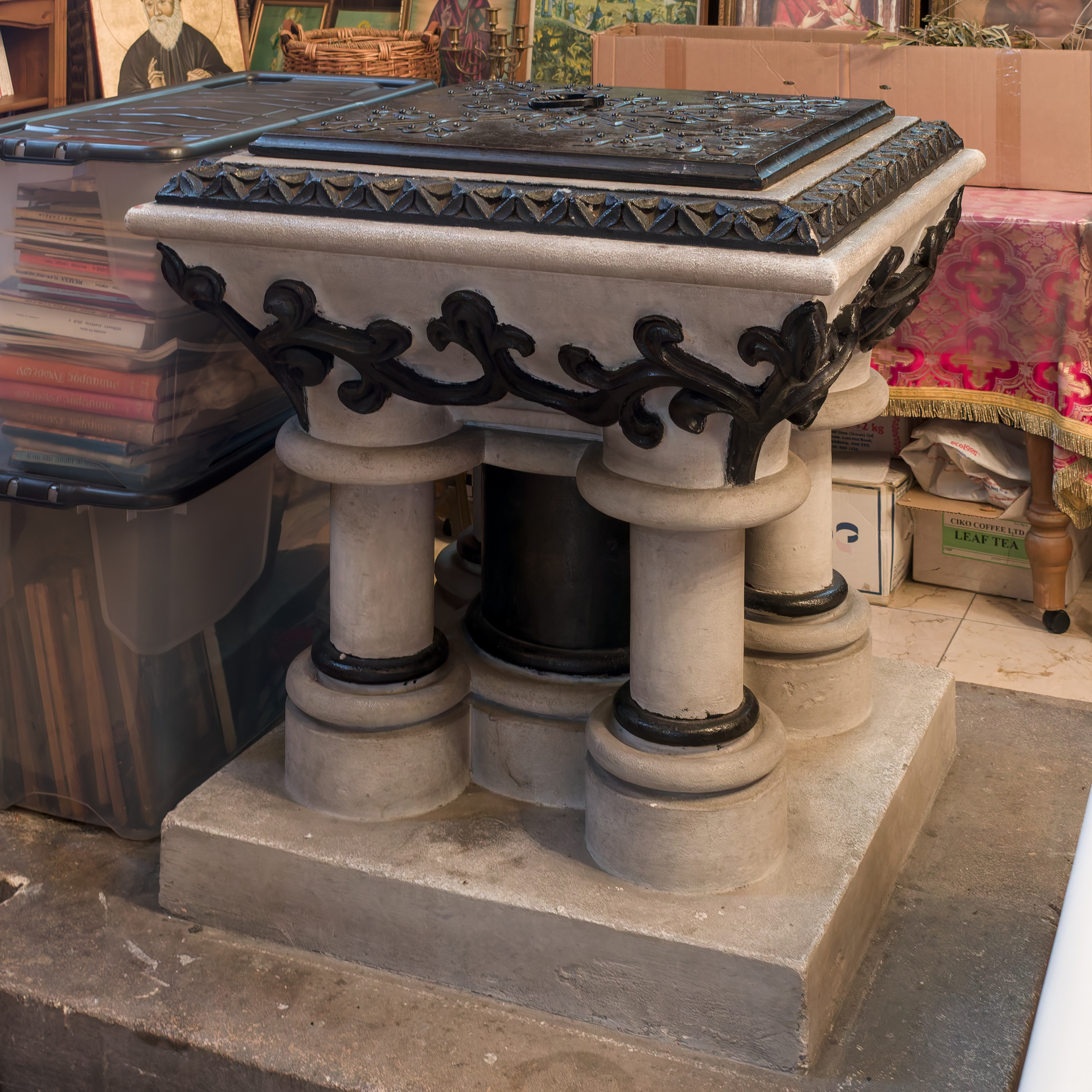
Baptismal font, W. Tate, 1891

=== Associated buildings ===
A parochial school was established early in the church's history, with new buildings erected in stages: an infants' and girls' school in 1872 (designed by Medland and Son of Gloucester), and a boys' school in 1890 (designed by E. Henry Edwards). The schools required frequent fundraising to maintain, and in 1871 the Vicar solicited assistance for the building fund. A later appeal would be launched in 1901 for funding for an additional classroom. The schoolrooms were central to parish life, hosting annual parochial tea meetings and festivals.

== Ministry and community ==
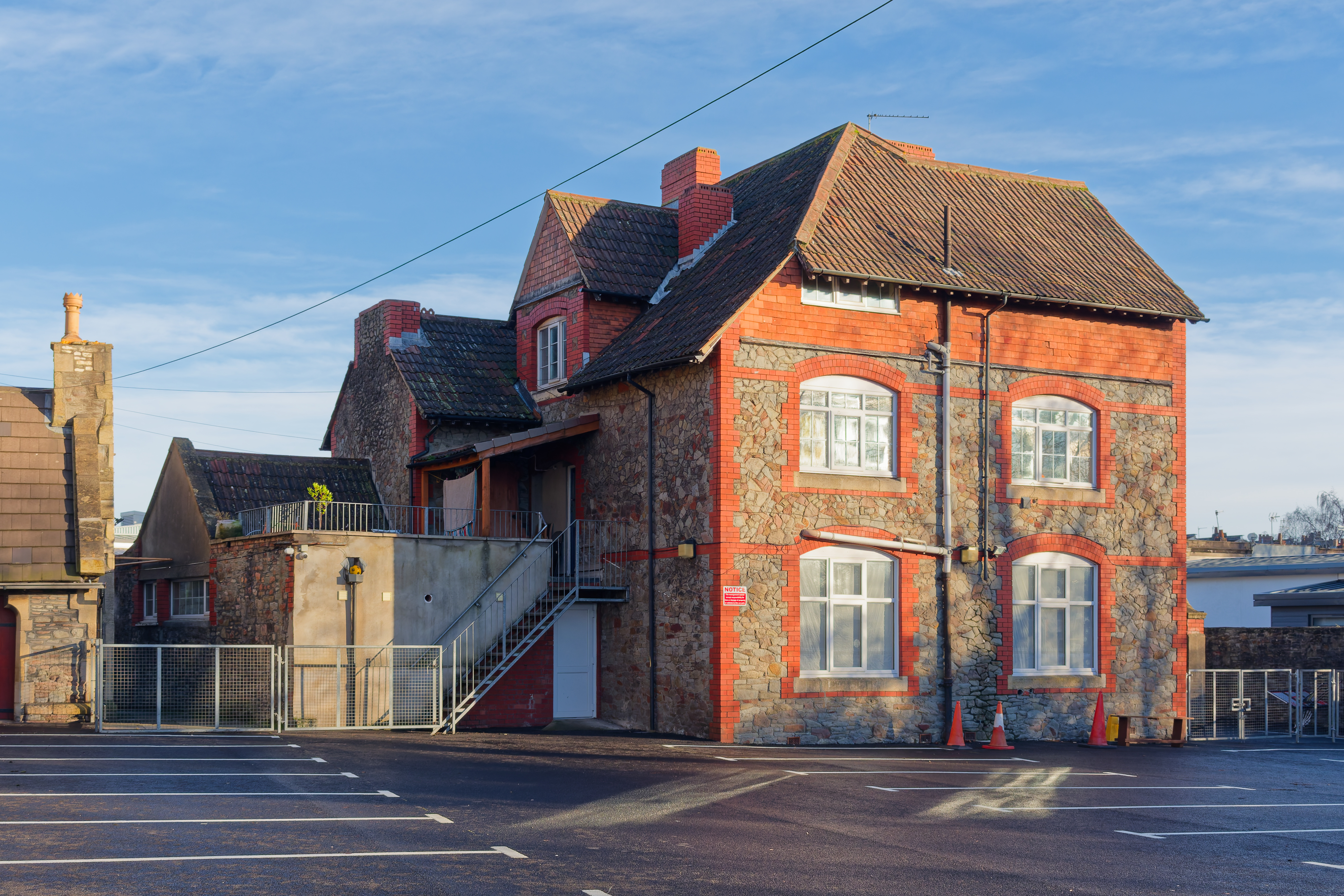
The neighbouring building that houses the Hellenic School of St Peter and St Paul

The church serves as the spiritual and cultural hub for the Greek and Greek-Cypriot community in Bristol, which is the largest in southwest England. By the 21st century, this community numbered approximately 2,500 people. The parish has been served by notable clergy including Archimandrite Erineos (the first Orthodox minister), Rev. Thomas Tsevas, Rev. Petar Yaconmelos, and Father George Nicolaou, who served the parish for decades following his arrival from Cyprus in 1979.

Beyond liturgical services, the church supports various educational and cultural institutions. A Greek language school, founded in 1958, operates within the community buildings. By 2017, the school had been running for 60 years and had approximately 110 students. On 5 March 2017, a new school and community lending library was inaugurated at the site by Costas Kadis, the Minister of Education and Culture of Cyprus. The church also maintains a Ladies Auxiliary Society and hosts the Consulate of Cyprus in Bristol. The church has also participated in city-wide events, such as the Bristol Diverse Doors Open Day in 2022.

== See also ==
- List of churches in Bristol
