= Easton Jamia Mosque =

Mosque in Bristol, England, United Kingdom

Religion
- Affiliation: Barelvi

Location
- Location: Bristol, England
- Interactive map of Easton Jamia Mosque
- Coordinates: 51.467291°N 2.5645063°W

Architecture
- Completed: 2017

Specifications
- Capacity: 600
- Dome: 1

Website
- Easton Jamia Masjid

The Easton Jamia Mosque is a mosque in the Easton area of Bristol, England, which has a striking and unique transparent dome.

== Description ==
The mosque has one dome. Both men and women are allowed to pray at the mosque, which has a capacity of 600 (400 men; 200 women). Easton Jamia Mosque is a registered charity and a member of Council of Bristol Mosques (CBM), a multi-denominational organisation of mosques in the city established in 2009. The congregation is of mixed origins but with a Pakistani majority.

== History ==
Easton Jamia Mosque was constructed c. 1855 as the St Mark's Road National School. The former school was converted into a mosque in 1983. In 2017, the mosque was enlarged and embellished with a transparent dome that is illuminated with green light at night.
