= Sam Walton (peace activist) =

Peace and human rights advocate

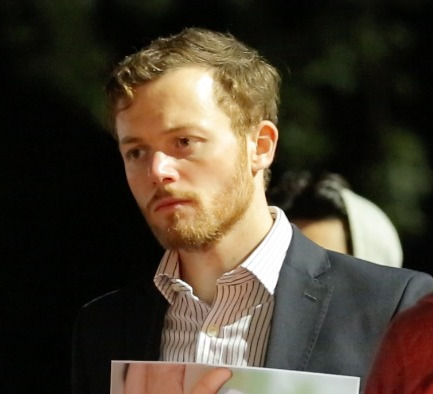
- Sam Walton at a vigil
- Born: Sam Walton; 1980s UK
- Occupations: Peace, human rights and civil liberties advocate
- Years active: 2011 - present
- Organization(s): Quaker Peace and Social Witness; Free Tibet; Netpol: The Network for Police Monitoring
- Known for: 2017 Warton Aerodrome action; attempted citizen's arrest of Ahmad Asiri; CEO Free Tibet

Sam Walton is a British peace, human rights and civil liberties campaigner.

He is most well known for his arrest on 29 January 2017 at Warton Aerodrome, Lancashire on suspicion of criminal damage after attempting to "disarm war planes" which he believed were bound for Saudi Arabia and an attempted citizen's arrest of the Saudi Major General Ahmed al-Asiri in London, which prompted the Foreign Secretary, Boris Johnson to apologise. He has also worked on protest policing and civil liberties with the Network for Police Monitoring.

Walton is a Quaker and used to work for Quaker Peace and Social Witness.

== Anti-arms trade activism ==
=== Count Me Out campaign ===
Throughout 2011 & 2012 Walton was involved in 'Count Me Out', a group who opposed to the company Lockheed Martin's involvement in the UK 2011 census.

=== Interruption of Vince Cable speech ===
On 26 April 2012 Walton interrupted the Business Secretary Vince Cable's address at a UK Trade & Investment Defence & Security Organisation (UKTI DSO) Symposium. He told delegates they were wasting trillions of pounds and should visit their local Job Centre, before being removed by event security.

=== Attempt to disarm fighter jets at Warton Aerodrome ===
On 29 January 2017 Walton and Methodist minister Dan Woodhouse were arrested after entering the British Aerospace Warton Aerodrome site after an attempt to disarm by damaging the Typhoon fighter jets stored there that they believed were bound for the Royal Saudi Air Force and therefore to be used in the Saudi Arabian-led intervention in Yemen. The action was inspired by the Seeds of Hope group of the Plowshares movement who damaged a Hawk fighter jet in 1996. The pair managed to get beyond fences, closed doors and sensors and were "just metres" from allegedly disarming Saudi Arabia-bound fighter planes with a hammer. These actions gave Walton province in Yemen.

In October 2017 Walton and Woodhouse appeared at Burnley Magistrates court facing charges of criminal damage; both were found not guilty after successfully arguing that they acted for the greater good. They were represented by Blinne Ní Ghrálaigh.

In 2019 Dissent Games released Disarm the Base, a co-operative board game in which players take the role of peace activists attempting to disable warplanes at a fictional airbase. The designer said the game was inspired by the 2017 Warton action and by the 1996 Seeds of Hope action.

=== Art the Arms fair ===
In September 2017 Walton was a key organiser of 'Art the arms fair' an art exhibition designed to coincide with the Defence and Security Equipment International arms fair. Banksy donated a work, Civilian Drone Strike., and proceeds from its sale were distributed to human rights and anti-arms-trade groups. Walton described the piece as a critique of the military-industrial complex.

== Police monitoring and civil liberties ==
In October 2012, as a spokesperson for Netpol: The Network for Police Monitoring Walton launched a graded national list of solicitors experienced in representing protesters, describing it as an attempt to pool knowledge across the movement.

Walton co-authored Netpol's November 2019 report Restricting the Rebellion, which assessed 521 reported incidents of potential abuse of police powers during the Extinction Rebellion protests in London in October 2019. The report found that the Metropolitan Police had discriminated against disabled protesters, used stop-and-search and Section 14 powers disproportionately, and had a chilling effect on freedom of assembly. Walton said the force's zero-tolerance approach had escalated into unnecessarily aggressive arrests and a disregard for protesters' welfare.

He was one of the editors of Netpol's 2026 report How Repression Became Routine: The State of Protest in 2025.

== Human rights work ==
In 2014 Walton tried to get into the Queen Elizabeth II Conference Centre to protest weapons sales to the dictatorship in Bahrain.

In 2017 Walton was outside of the Bahraini embassy with Sayed Alwadaei when someone from within the embassy threw boiling water on the protest he was involved in.

On 30 March 2017 Walton attempted a citizen's arrest on Ahmad Asiri, spokesman for the Saudi-led coalition in Yemen, who was visiting London, citing accusations of war crimes in Yemen.

On 2 April 2017 the Saudi Press Agency reported that the Foreign Secretary, Boris Johnson, had telephoned Deputy Crown Prince Mohammed bin Salman to apologise for the incident. The Foreign Office confirmed that the call had taken place and said Johnson had expressed regret at the disturbance.

In September 2017 Walton delivered an oral intervention on behalf of Americans for Democracy & Human Rights in Bahrain debate at the 36th session of the United Nations Human Rights Council in Geneva.

In 2018 Walton supported Ali Mushaima's hungerstike outside Bahrain's London embassy to call for his father Hasan Mushaima's release.

In March 2020 Walton was appointed Chief Executive of Free Tibet and its research partner Tibet Watch. Later that year he oversaw Free Tibet's merger with the Tibet Society.

== Selected publications ==
- The New Tide of Militarism (Quaker Peace & Social Witness, 2014).
- "The Tories and the police – who is playing who?", openDemocracy, 22 May 2015
- “Even the UK courts believe our arms sales to Saudi Arabia are wrong”, The Independent, 27 October 2017 (with Daniel Woodhouse)
- Restricting the Rebellion (Netpol: The Network for Police Monitoring, 2019) (with Kevin Blowe)
- “We Also Broke Into an Airbase to Stop War Crimes”, Novara Media, 27 June 2025 (with Daniel Woodhouse)
- “If Palestine Action are terrorists then so is Jesus”, The Friend, 27 February 2026 (with Daniel Woodhouse)

Walton has also written for OpenDemocracy, Novara Media, The Canary Peace News, Ceasefire Magazine & Red Pepper (magazine)

== See also ==
- Christian pacifism
- Plowshares movement
- Campaign Against Arms Trade
- Netpol: The Network for Police Monitoring
