= Bahrain Institute for Rights and Democracy =

- Founded: October 2013 in London
- Type: Non-profit; NGO
- Location: London
- Services: Protecting human rights
- Fields: Human rights, non-violence, research, advocacy
- Key people: Sayed Ahmed Alwadaei
- Website: birdbh.org

The Bahrain Institute for Rights and Democracy (BIRD) is a non-profit human rights organisation based in London which promotes democratisation and human rights in Bahrain. It was founded by Sayed Ahmed Alwadaei, Alaa Shehabi and Hussain Abdullah in 2013, and was funded by the Sigrid Rausing Trust from 2016 to 2019. The National Endowment for Democracy approved a grant for the year 2015.

== Leadership ==
=== Sayed Ahmed Alwadaei ===
One of the founders of BIRD, Sayed Ahmed Alwadaei, received attention for his advocacy work and for protesting against visits by members of the Bahraini royal family to the United Kingdom. As a fugitive from Bahrain, he subsequently had his Bahraini citizenship revoked in January 2015 and has applied for asylum in the United Kingdom. In 2020, he was co-winner of the Index on Censorship "campaigning" award, for "his work as a prominent critic of the Bahraini government ... despite the danger faced by him and his family."

== Campaigns ==
BIRD has led a number of campaigns to raise awareness about what they view as the political repression of the Bahraini pro-democracy movement. These have included campaigns around the Bahrain Formula 1 race and the candidacy of Sheikh Salman Alkhalifa for President of FIFA in 2016.

BIRD has been active in campaigning for the release of Bahraini human rights activist Nabeel Rajab, who has been repeatedly imprisoned in Bahrain after criticising the Bahraini government.

BIRD has worked closely with regional and international human rights organisations including Human Rights Watch, Reprieve, Amnesty International, UK-based Campaign Against Arms Trade, the Stop The War Coalition, Bahrain Center for Human Rights (BCHR), and Americans for Democracy and Human Rights in Bahrain (ADHRB).
