= Blinne Ní Ghrálaigh =

Irish barrister

Blinne Ní Ghrálaigh KC
- Born: Blinne Nessa Áine Ní Ghrálaigh; Ireland
- Citizenship: Ireland; England
- Education: Queens' College, Cambridge; University of Westminster; New York University
- Occupations: Lawyer; International lawyer
- Employer: Matrix Chambers
- Known for: Croatia–Serbia genocide case Colston Four trial South Africa's genocide case against Israel

Blinne Nessa Áine Ní Ghrálaigh KC is an Irish lawyer who has worked in England and Ireland. She specialises in human rights and international law.

As an international human rights lawyer she has participated in cases such as Croatia–Serbia genocide case (2015), Colston Four trial (2020) and South Africa's genocide case against Israel (2023).

== Early life and education ==
Ní Ghrálaigh spent her early childhood in Glenamoy, a village in County Mayo. Her mother was from Dublin and her father from Mayo. Ní Ghrálaigh grew up in Holloway, North London where her mother taught at Tufnell Park Primary School. She was interested in law from a young age, and would spend her school holidays visiting the gallery of the Old Bailey. She studied French and Latin at Queens' College, Cambridge on a Foundation Scholarship, graduating with a Bachelor of Arts (BA) in Modern and Medieval Languages.

After graduating, Ní Ghrálaigh worked for an American think tank, for an NGO, and as a paralegal for a human rights firm in London. She was offered a job as a legal observer on the Bloody Sunday Inquiry, prompting her to move to Derry for a year. Ní Ghrálaigh said of the experience in 2022, "It was an immense privilege to be part of that historic legal process" and that she remains friends with a number of the families she worked with. She went on to complete a Graduate Diploma in Law at the University of Westminster and a Master of Laws (LLM) in International Legal Studies at New York University. She also took a vocational course at the Inns of Court School of Law.

== Career ==
Ní Ghrálaigh joined Matrix Chambers in 2005, when she was called to the Bar of England and Wales. Later she was also called to the Bar of Northern Ireland in 2013 and to the Bar of Ireland in 2017. She was vice chair of the Bar Human Rights Committee of England and Wales (BHRC) from 2014 to 2019. In 2016, she was a visiting fellow at Harvard Law School.

At the end of 2022 and beginning of 2023, Ní Ghrálaigh was appointed to King's Counsel and welcomed as a new silk by Lincoln's Inn. Also in 2022, she was shortlisted for Barrister of the Year by The Lawyer and placed third.

In July 2025, Ní Ghrálaigh became an adjunct professor at the University of Galway's Irish Centre for Human Rights. In 2025, She was named as Woman Lawyer of the Year by the Irish Women Lawyers Association (IWLA).

== Notable cases ==
In 2015, Ní Ghrálaigh worked on the Croatia–Serbia genocide case at the International Court of Justice on behalf of Croatia, though both claims were ultimately dismissed. In 2017, she secured an acquittal for activists Sam Walton and Dan Woodhouse, who had been arrested for attempting to disarm Typhoon jets they believed were bound for Saudi Arabia to be used to bomb Yemen.

Ní Ghrálaigh worked on the 'Hooded Men' case which dealt with allegations of torture and ill-treatment by the Royal Ulster Constabulary in the 1970s. The case sought to reopen the investigations into these case in light of new evidence. After success in the High Court and the Court of Appeal in Northern Ireland, the Supreme Court sided with the UK Government that no new investigations should be opened.

Ní Ghrálaigh went on to work on the Colston Four trial regarding the toppling of the Colston statue by four protesters in Bristol in 2020, representing Rhian Graham. The jury acquitted the protesters in January 2022, and The Times named Ní Ghrálaigh Lawyer of the Week.

In January 2024, Ní Ghrálaigh returned to the International Court of Justice as a member of the legal team representing South Africa's proceedings accusing Israel of genocide. In her remarks, Ní Ghrálaigh claimed it to be the "first genocide in history" to be broadcast "in real-time" and pointed out the "dehumanising genocidal rhetoric" by Israeli governmental and military officials. She also outlined that the number of Palestinian orphans caused by Israel's assault in the Gaza Strip has led to a "terrible, new" acronym WCNSFs (Wounded Child, No Surviving Family) and highlighted that the UNICEF called Israel's actions a "war on children". Ní Ghrálaigh was praised for her statement by viewers on social media with British journalist Owen Jones saying it "floored" him. She had previously been to the Gaza strip on a legal fact-finding in the aftermath of Operation Cast Lead in 2009.

== Bibliography ==
- "Human Rights, International Justice and the Rule of Law" in Globalisation – A Liberal Response (2007), with Philippe Sands
- "Towards an International Rule of Law?" in Tom Bingham and the Transformation of the Law: A Liber Amicorum (2009), with Philippe Sands
- "Civilian Protections and the Arms Trade Treaty" in The Grey Zone (2018)
