= European Network on Statelessness =

NGO working to eradicate statelessness in Europe

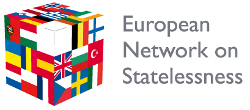
- Founded: 2012
- Type: Non-profit, NGO
- Headquarters: London, United Kingdom
- Location: Europe
- Services: Legal advocacy, media attention, research, policy advocacy
- Fields: statelessness, human rights, nationality, human migration
- Members: Alliance of 103 members in 39 countries
- Director: Chris Nash
- Website: www.statelessness.eu

European Network on Statelessness (also known as ENS) is a non-governmental organisation working to eradicate statelessness in Europe. It is a network of over 100 non-governmental organisations, academic initiatives, and individual experts across 39 countries.

== Background ==
Initially hosted as a project of its six founding organisations, the European Network on Statelessness was launched in 2012. In September 2014, ENS registered as a Charitable Incorporated Organisation in the UK. As of 2015, it was a network of over 100 non-governmental organisations, academic initiatives, and individual experts across 39 countries. As of 2015, the stated objective of the organisation was "committed to ending statelessness and ensuring that the estimated 600,000 people living in Europe without a nationality are protected under international law." As of 2021 Nina Murray was head of policy and research at the ENS.

== Work ==
In April 2021, ENS published a report on the barriers stateless people face in access to healthcare both generally and in regard to COVID 19 during the COVID-19 pandemic, and how these are similar to or different from other marginalised groups, and the impact of these barriers. Examples are job loss in the informal economy, lack of access to welfare support, lack of access to health care and fear of data sharing between healthcare and immigration authorities, all increasing risk of increased morbidity and extreme poverty.
