= Netpol: The Network for Police Monitoring =

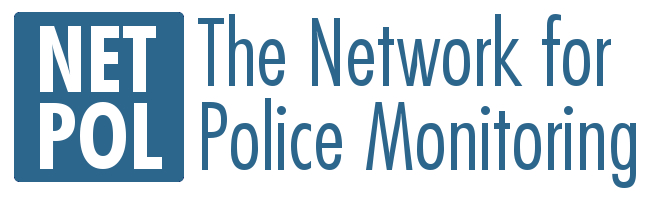
- Netpol: The Network for Police Monitoring logo
- Abbreviation: Netpol
- Formation: November 2009; 16 years ago
- Founders: Aldermaston Women's Peace Camp, Campaign Against Criminalising Communities (CAMPACC), Climate Camp Legal Team, FITwatch, Green & Black Cross, Legal Defence & Monitoring Group, Newham Monitoring Project
- Type: Campaign group / policing monitoring network
- Purpose: Monitoring and campaigning against public order and protest policing
- Region served: England, Wales and Scotland
- Website: netpol.org

Netpol: The Network for Police Monitoring (Netpol) is a British campaign group and coalition of activist and community organisations that monitors and campaigns against public order and protest policing in the United Kingdom. Founded in 2009, it publishes reports and guidance on policing tactics such as kettling, surveillance, and the use of the "extremism" label against protesters, and campaigns on issues including the policing of Black Lives Matter and Extinction Rebellion protests, anti-fracking demonstrations, and legislation restricting the right to protest.

== History ==
Netpol was established in November 2009, after activists from several existing campaign and legal observer groups who had worked together following the policing of the 2009 G20 London summit protests agreed to form a permanent network. Its seven founding member organisations were the Aldermaston Women's Peace Camp, the Campaign Against Criminalising Communities (CAMPACC), the Camp for Climate Action Legal Team, FITwatch (Forward intelligence team Watch), Green & Black Cross, the Legal Defence & Monitoring Group, and the Newham Monitoring Project.

The group held its first conference, "Standing Up to Surveillance", in London in April 2011.

From 2016 Netpol's work increasingly focused on the policing of anti-fracking protests in England, under a project called "Protecting the Protectors". In November 2020 the group published "Britain is Not Innocent", a report on the policing of the 2020 UK Black Lives Matter protests, which concluded that policing of the demonstrations had been "institutionally racist"; the report was authored by an academic and drew on testimony from more than 100 witnesses. The following year, Netpol was among the organisations that submitted written evidence to the UK Parliament's Public Bill Committee scrutinising the Police, Crime, Sentencing and Courts Bill.

Since 2025 Netpol has published an annual "State of Protest" report assessing trends in protest policing across Britain; the second edition, "How Repression Became Routine", was published in March 2026.

== Activities ==
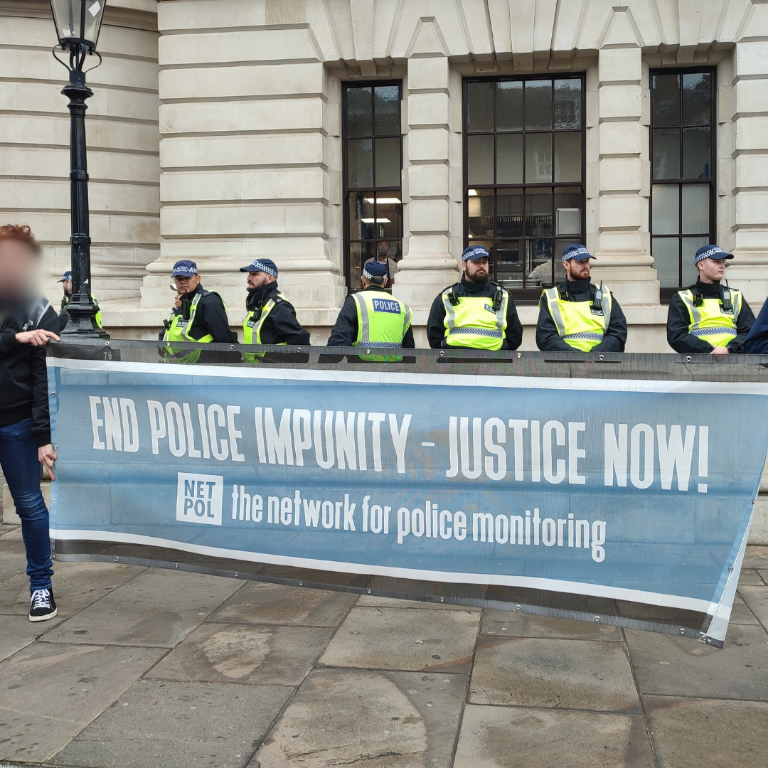
End Police Impunity - Justice Now!

Netpol's activities include:

- Publishing reports on the policing of specific protest movements, including anti-fracking campaigns (Protecting the Protectors, 2016), Extinction Rebellion demonstrations in London (Restricting the Rebellion, 2019), and the 2020 Black Lives Matter protests (Britain is Not Innocent, 2020).
- Producing guidance for protesters and legal observers on topics such as kettling, police liaison officers, and responding to police surveillance.
- Campaigning against the police use of the "domestic extremism" classification and against expanded Prevent and counter-terrorism powers as applied to protest movements.
- Making submissions to parliamentary inquiries and government consultations on policing and public order legislation, including on the Police, Crime, Sentencing and Courts Bill.
- Publishing an annual "State of Protest" report tracking the use of public order powers against protesters.

== Commentary on policing ==
Netpol is regularly approached by journalists for comment on protest and public order policing, and has taken public positions on several specific policing issues beyond its own published reports.

During the COVID-19 pandemic, Netpol ran Policing the Corona State, a joint monitoring project with the Undercover Research Group that tracked the police and local-authority use of coronavirus regulations, including their impact on the right to protest. Netpol also publicly opposed the Coronavirus Act 2020's expansion of police and immigration detention powers, warning that the new rules risked compounding discrimination already faced by some communities in their dealings with police.

Netpol has also been a vocal critic of police use of mass surveillance technology. It was one of the organisations quoted when the Metropolitan Police first indicated it might deploy live facial recognition at protests, warning that the technology could increase tension between police and demonstrators and put people who conceal their faces for privacy reasons at greater risk of being treated as suspicious. In 2024, Netpol was one of seventeen civil society organisations — alongside groups such as Big Brother Watch and the Open Rights Group — that signed an open letter to the Home Secretary calling for an outright ban on AI-driven predictive policing and biometric surveillance systems.

== Reception ==
Netpol's reports and analysis have been covered by outlets including HuffPost UK, Novara Media, The Justice Gap, Computer Weekly, The Guardian and Vice, and Netpol representatives have been quoted on policing issues by the Bureau of Investigative Journalism and others.
