= Easton, Bristol =

Area of Bristol, England

Coordinates: 51.45909°N 2.56993°W

Easton
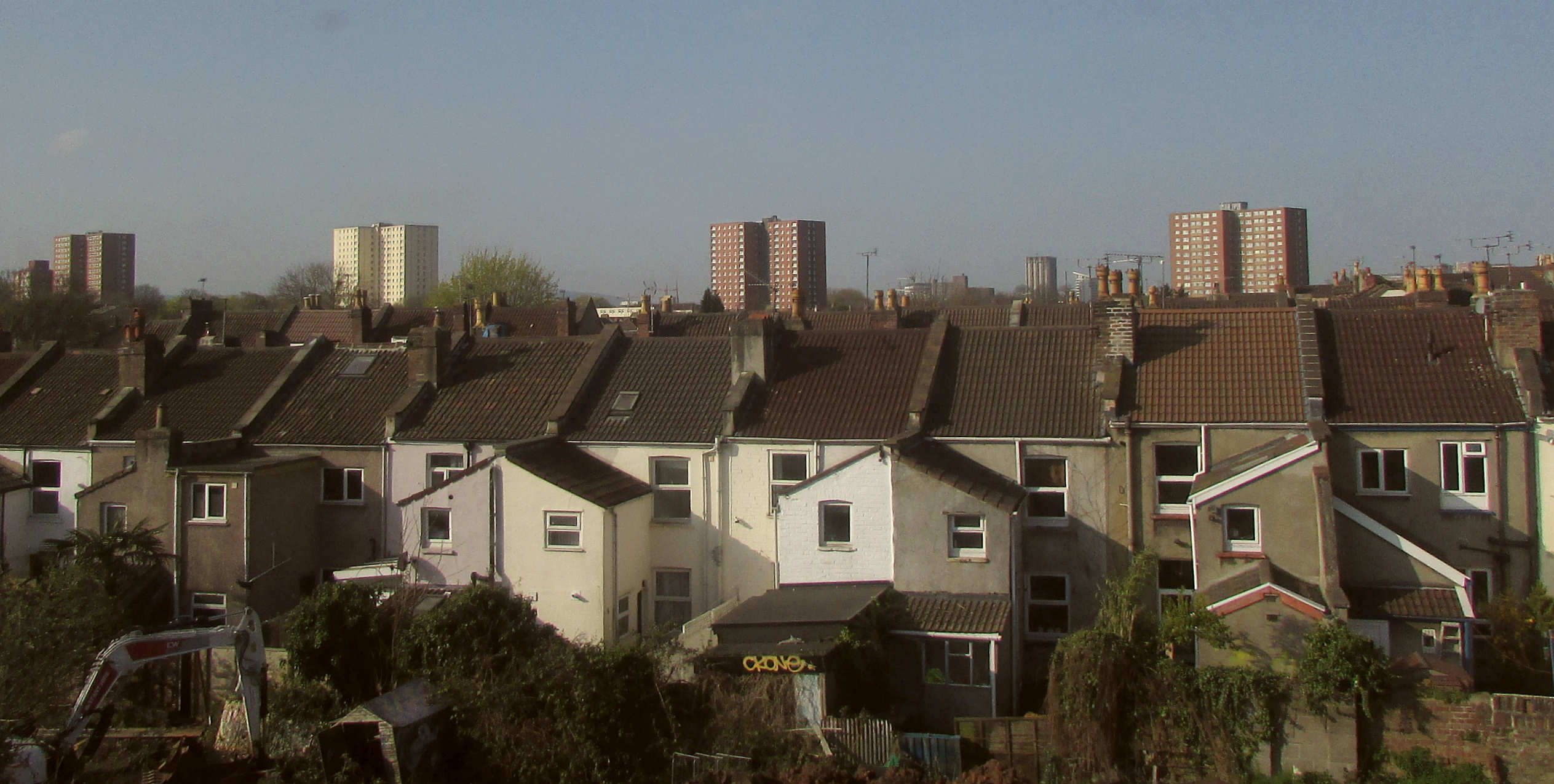
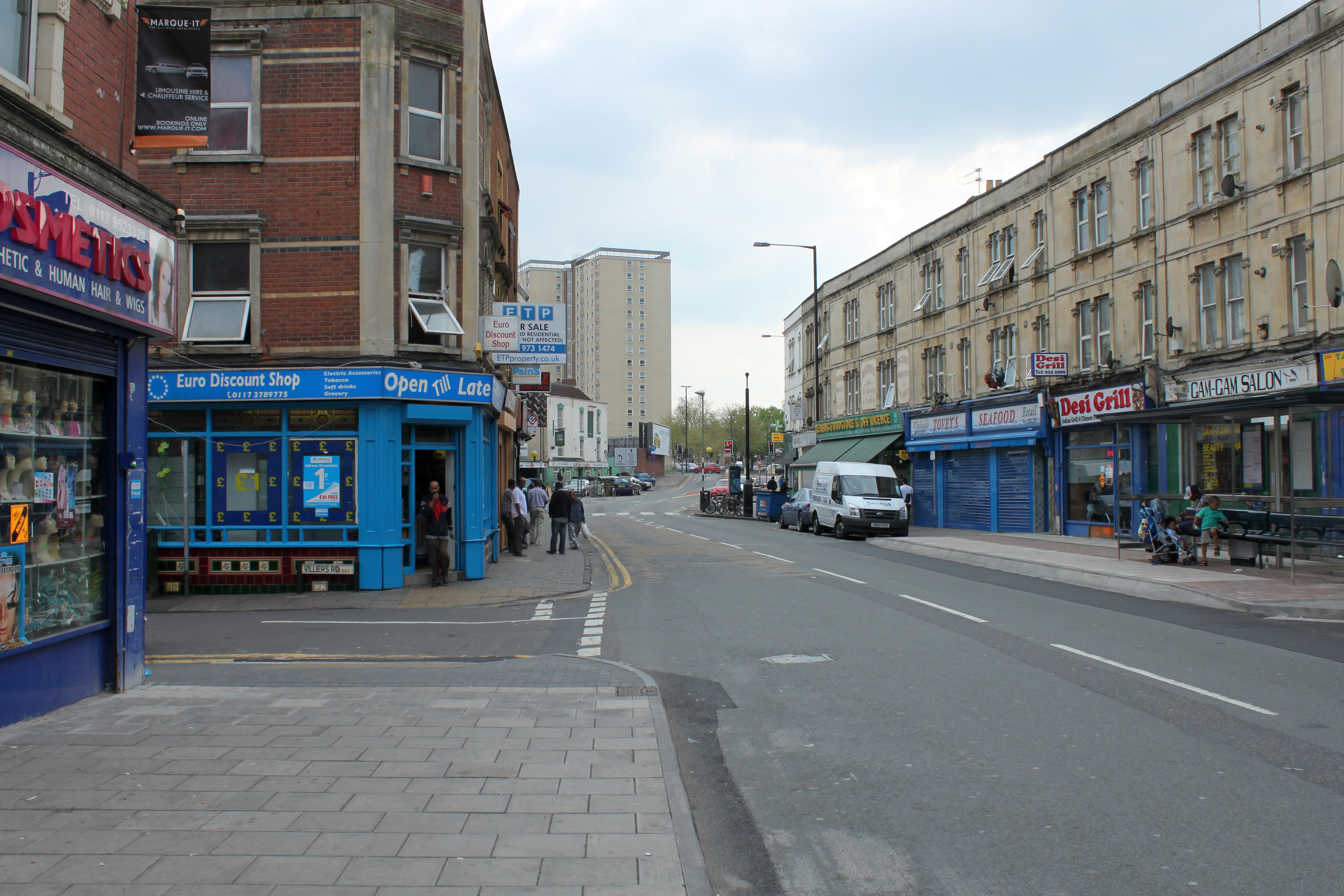
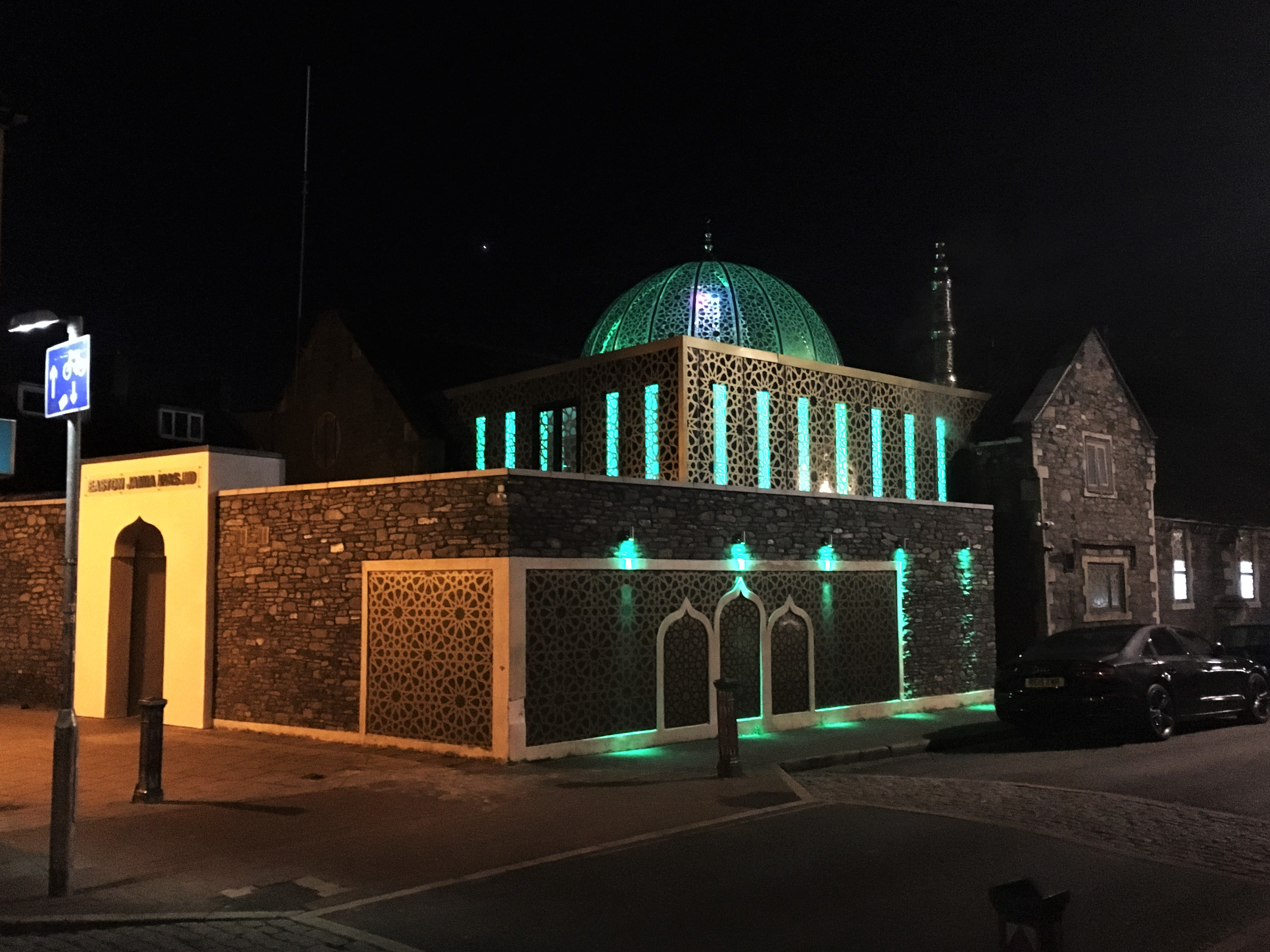
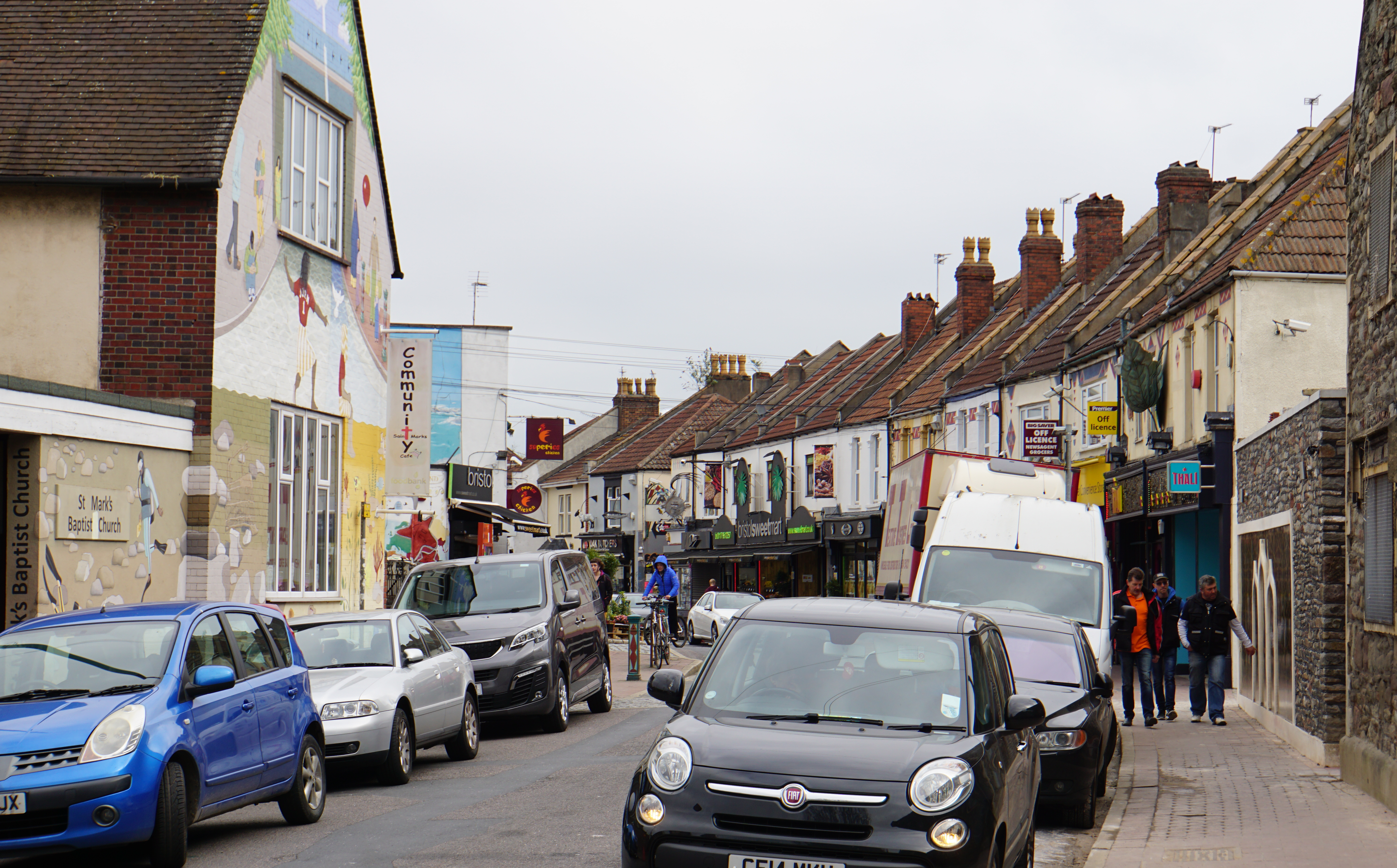
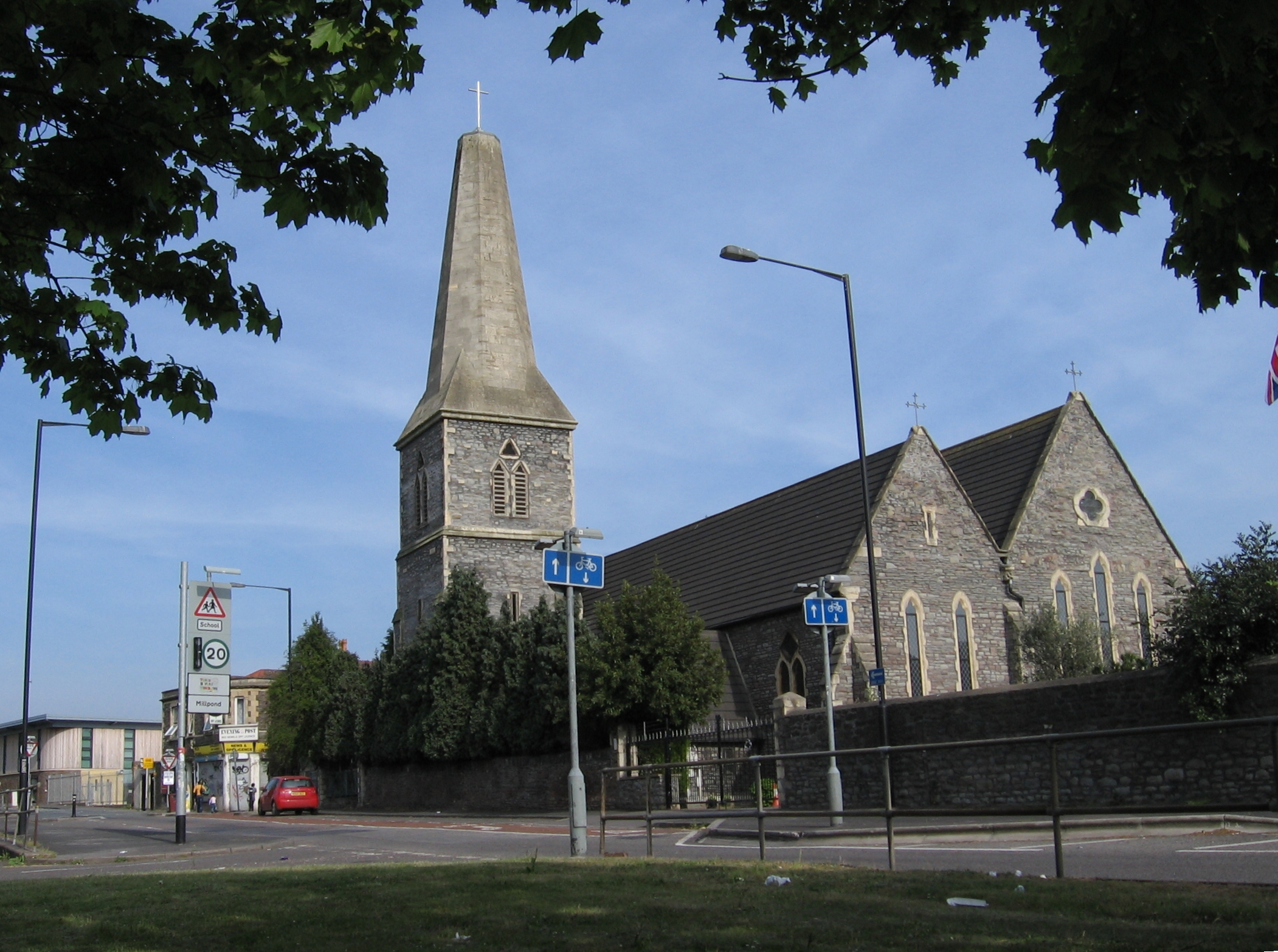
- From the top to bottom-right, tower blocks in Easton, Stapleton Road, Easton Jamia Mosque, St Mark's Road, St Peter and St Paul Greek Orthodox Church

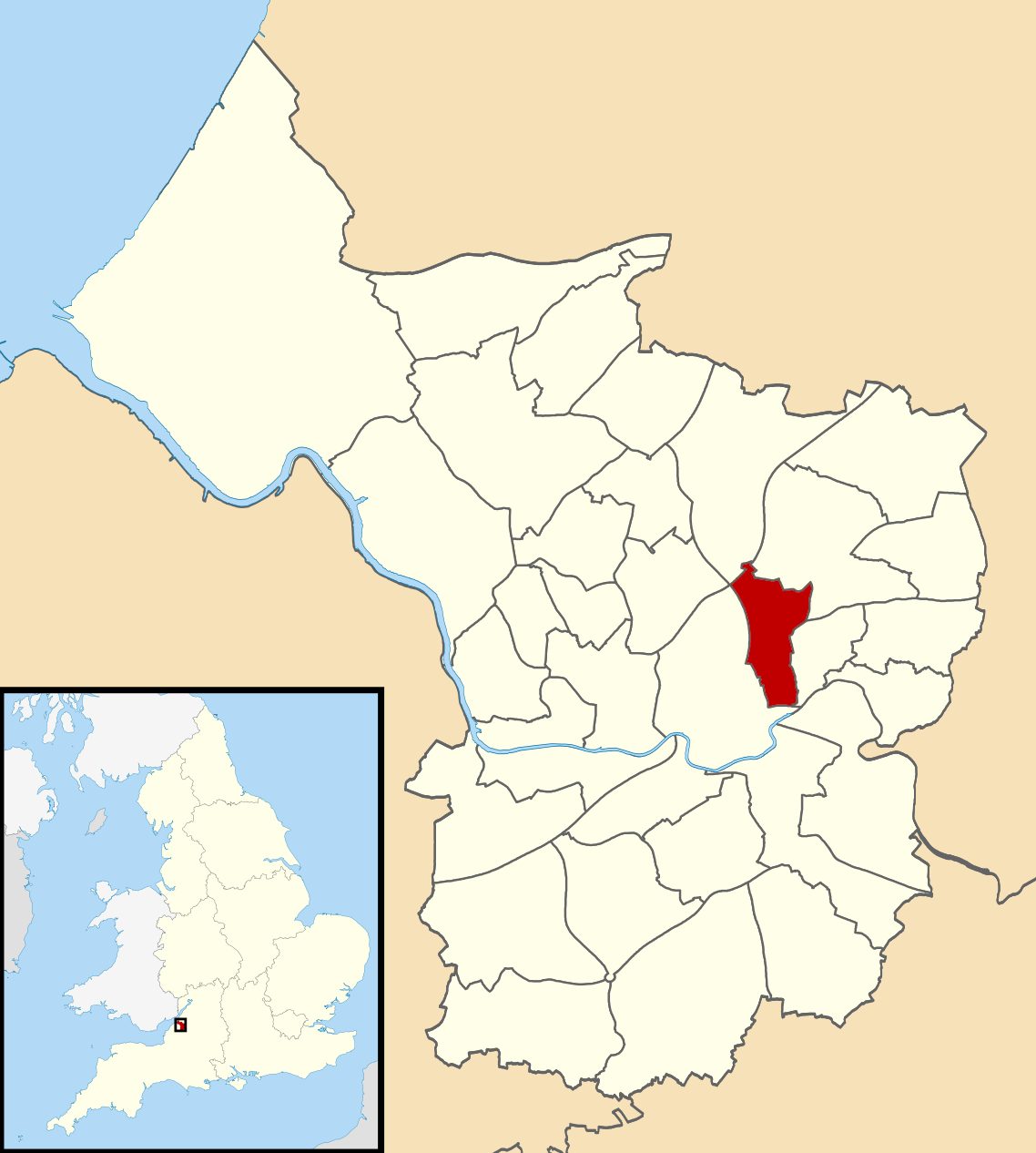
- Boundaries of the city council ward since 2016
- Population: 13,541 (2011)
- OS grid reference: ST605735
- Unitary authority: Bristol
- Ceremonial county: Bristol
- Region: South West
- Country: England
- Sovereign state: United Kingdom
- Post town: BRISTOL
- Postcode district: BS5
- Dialling code: 0117
- Police: Avon and Somerset
- Fire: Avon
- Ambulance: South Western
- UK Parliament: Bristol East

Easton is an inner city area of the city of Bristol in the United Kingdom. Informally the area is considered to stretch east of Bristol city centre and the M32 motorway, centred on Lawrence Hill. Its southern and eastern borders are less defined, merging into St Philip's Marsh and Eastville. The area includes the Lawrence Hill and Barton Hill estates.

In administrative terms, Easton comprises the electoral wards of Easton and part of Lawrence Hill. It is located within the Bristol East constituency. The electoral ward of Easton includes parts of the localities of Netham and Whitehall, and a large part of Greenbank. The Bristol & Bath Railway Path passes through the ward.

Easton is noted for its culturally diverse community, centred on the shopping streets of Stapleton Road and St Marks Road, the latter noted for the exuberant sculpted signs that hang above many of the shop doors and the architecturally striking illuminated dome of Easton Mosque. There are a number of East African and Indian subcontinent restaurants and shops specialising in organic and ethnic foods.

== History ==
In the medieval period Easton lay within the Royal Forest of Kingswood in the manor of Barton Regis. The name Easton is probably derived from the Anglo-Saxon East Tun meaning East Farm. The earliest documentary reference to Easton is Chester and Master's 1610 Map of Kingswood, which depicts three settlements: Upper Easton, which was centered on Easton Road, Lower Easton, which was centered on St Marks Road, and Baptist Mills, on the east bank of the River Frome.

In the post-medieval period the area became increasingly industrial with large scale extraction of coal, clay and sand occurring across the area. In the 19th century most of Easton was developed for housing.

In the late 1950s and 1960s, Bristol City Council pursued large-scale slum clearance and comprehensive redevelopment in parts of Easton, supported by compulsory purchase orders and a long-term plan to rebuild substandard Victorian housing with modern council housing. The scheme, known as the Easton Comprehensive Redevelopment Area, was approved in 1964 as a mixed-density estate of tower blocks, four-storey maisonettes and houses, with pedestrian–vehicle segregation, but reduced in scale after intervention by the Ministry of Housing and Local Government. The project was publicly launched in 1965, when housing minister Richard Crossman laid a foundation stone for the first tower, later Rawnsley House, and construction continued into the 1970s. Redevelopment also coincided with major road-building, including the A4320 Easton Way (planned as part of the Outer Circuit Road) and the M32 corridor, which reshaped parts of the district's street pattern and contributed to prolonged planning blight in areas awaiting clearance and rebuilding.

During the late 20th century, Easton developed a reputation for crime and drugs problems, and by 2005 Stapleton Road was described by The Sunday People newspaper as "Britain's most dangerous street". In 2002, the Home Secretary David Blunkett visited Stapleton Road when announcing it as one of five areas with high crime rates to receive additional government support for policing. During this time, Easton was one of the most deprived areas in the south west of England, with the Lawrence Hill ward the most deprived ward in the region and one of the most deprived in Britain. This resulted in the area being granted European Union objective 2 status and 'New Deal for Communities' status by the UK government which is only granted to the most underprivileged urban wards.

In the 2010s, Easton's reputation began to shift to that of a neighbourhood experiencing gentrification, with the Bristol Post describing it as having been "in the grip of gentrification" since 2015. In 2019, Time Out magazine named Easton one of its "top 50 coolest neighbourhoods" in the world. In 2020, one analysis of house prices named Easton as the British neighbourhood where prices had risen by the highest percentage over the last decade. The area still experiences crime and antisocial behaviour but not as high as it was in the late 1990s and early 2000s.

== Demographics ==
The Census 2011 reported that Easton has a higher proportion of under 10s and people in the 25–44 age group than the England and Wales average, but fewer 10 to 15 year olds and people aged over 45.

== Banksy ==
Banksy lived in Easton in the 1990s. There are several of his artworks in the area, although the council inadvertently painted over one and another has had a tin of paint thrown over it. This was possibly done in response to the house that the art was attached to being sold as a piece of Banksy graffiti with a house thrown in for free.

== Sport ==
The area is home to Easton Leisure Centre.

== Transport ==
Easton has two railway stations, Lawrence Hill and Stapleton Road, which are served by trains on the Severn Beach Line plus services to and from Gloucester and South Wales. The main line to South Wales, the Midlands, Scotland and London also passes through Lawrence Hill and Stapleton Road; after which the Severn Beach line branches off just north of. The M32 motorway marks the border of Easton to the north. The A4032 dual carriageway cuts the area in two.

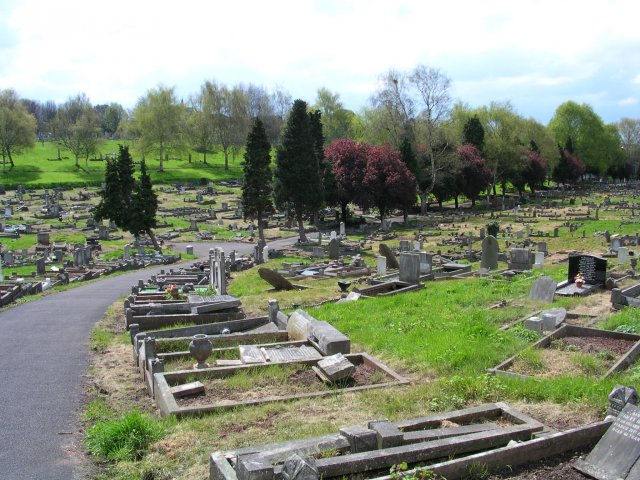
Greenbank Cemetery

== Notable people ==
- Bobby De Cordova-Reid, footballer
- Ruby Helder, opera singer
- Lawrence Hoo, poet and activist
- Moses McKenzie, writer
- Marvin Rees, politician and former mayor of Bristol
