= Colston Four trial =

English criminal trial

- Court: Bristol Crown Court, Bristol
- Full case name: R v Rhian Graham, Milo Ponsford, Jake Skuse and Sage Willoughby
- Verdict: Not guilty
- Charge: Criminal damage

R v Rhian Graham, Milo Ponsford, Jake Skuse and Sage Willoughby, known as the Colston four, was a British court case surrounding the toppling of the statue of Edward Colston, involving four defendants accused of criminal damage in relation to the removal and dumping in the harbour of the controversial statue in Bristol in 2020 during a protest.

The four defendants were acquitted by jury after a trial.

== Events ==
Map of statue's original location and place at which it was pushed into the harbour

On 7 June 2020, during the global protests following the murder of George Floyd in the United States, the statue of slave trader Edward Colston was pulled down by demonstrators who then jumped on it. They daubed it in red and blue paint, and one protester placed his knee on the statue's neck to allude to Floyd's murder by a white policeman who knelt on Floyd's neck for over nine minutes. The statue was then rolled down Anchor Road and pushed into Bristol Harbour.

Superintendent Andy Bennett of Avon and Somerset Police stated that they had made a "tactical decision" not to intervene and had allowed the statue to be toppled, citing a concern that stopping the act could have led to further violence and a riot. They also stated that the act was criminal damage and confirmed that there would be an investigation to identify those involved, adding that they were in the process of collating footage of the incident.

The Home Secretary, Priti Patel, called the toppling "utterly disgraceful", "completely unacceptable" and "sheer vandalism". She added, "it speaks to the acts of public disorder that have become a distraction from the cause people are protesting about." The Mayor of Bristol, Marvin Rees, said those comments showed an "absolute lack of understanding".

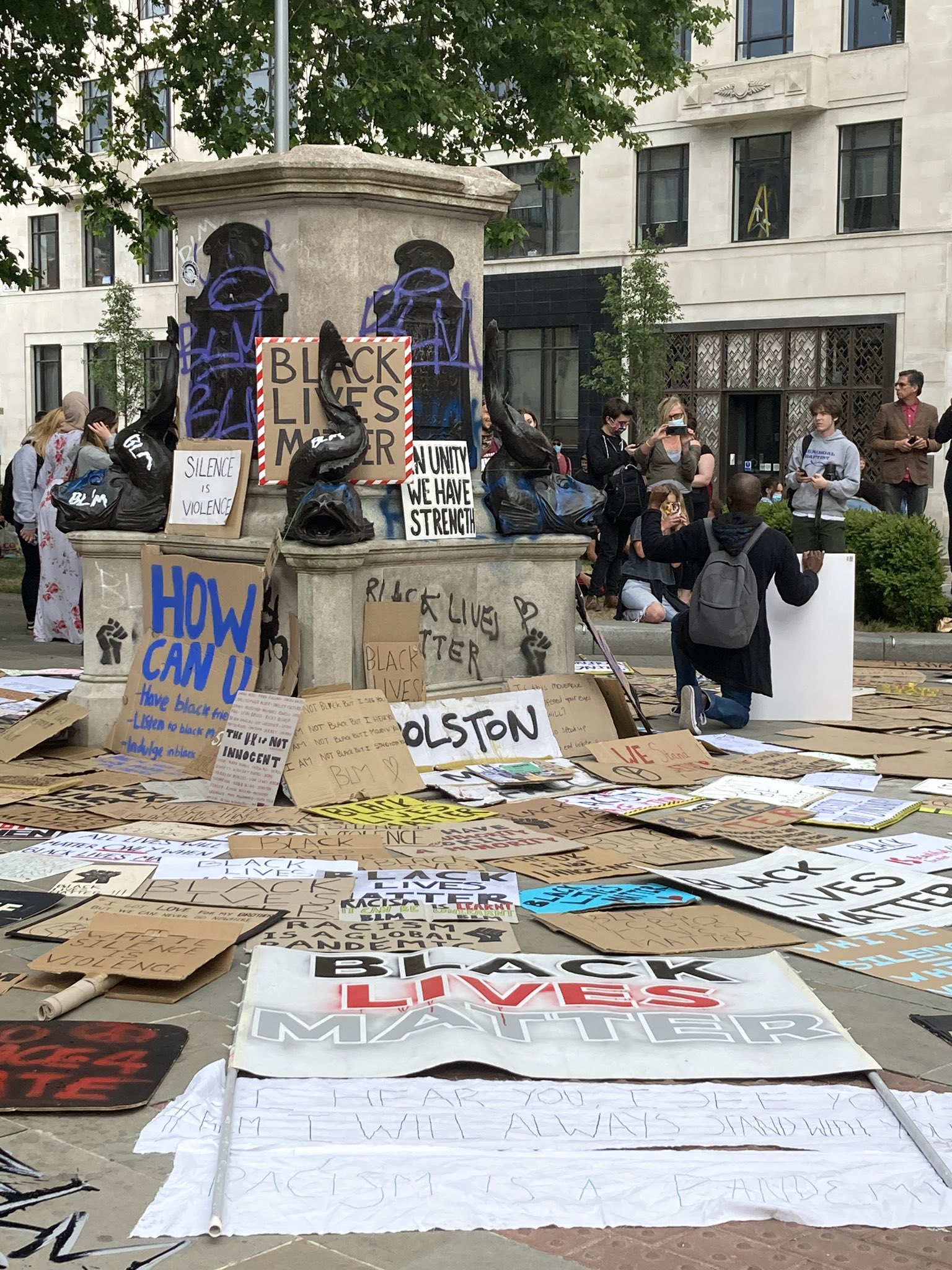
The empty pedestal, showing placards and graffiti

At 5 am on 11 June 2020, the statue was retrieved from Bristol Harbour by Bristol City Council. The statue was found filled with mud and sediments from the harbour floor. The council said the statue was structurally stable, although it had lost one of its coattails, the walking stick, and faced damage to its left side and to the foot. They stated they had cleaned the statue to prevent corrosion, and that they planned to exhibit it in a museum without removing the graffiti and ropes placed on it by the protesters.

== Police investigation ==
The day after the toppling, the police announced that they identified 17 people in connection with the incident, but had not yet made any arrests. On 22 June 2020 the police released images of people connected to the incident, and asked the public for help identifying the individuals. On 1 July, an unnamed 24-year-old man was arrested on suspicion of criminal damage to the statue and was bailed under police investigation. In September 2020, Avon and Somerset Police said that files on four people suspected of criminal damage had been passed to the Crown Prosecution Service to decide if charges should be brought. A further five people had been offered restorative justice, such as a fine and community service. By 1 October 2020, a total of six people had accepted conditional cautions relating to the events of 7 June.

== Criminal charges and trial ==
On 9 December 2020, four people—Rhian Graham, Milo Ponsford, Jake Skuse and Sage Willoughby, often referred to as the "Colston 4"—were charged with causing criminal damage in relation to the toppling of the statue. They appeared at Bristol Magistrates' Court on 2 March 2021 and entered a plea of not guilty. Their trial began at Bristol Crown Court on 13 December 2021. Before the trial, the graffiti artist Banksy produced a T-shirt to be sold to support the accused.

The four did not deny that they toppled the statue, but advanced several defences that doing so was not an act of criminal damage within the meaning of the law. The defences that were included in the judge's directions to the jury were:

1. That the statue had not in fact been damaged—indeed, that it had been made more valuable by the process of toppling, removal from the harbour, and display in the museum.
2. That the removal of the statue helped to prevent another crime, because the display of the statue itself was a criminal act of displaying indecent or abusive material, saying Colston's "continued veneration ... in a vibrant multicultural city was an act of abuse".
3. Two defendants also argued that they believed the statue was collectively owned by the people of Bristol, who in the circumstances would agree with the act of toppling it. In fact the statue was owned by Bristol City Council, but even a mistaken belief about the owner and the owners' intentions would have been grounds for acquittal, if the jury felt that belief was sincerely held.
4. The judge also directed the jury that even if not convinced by any of these arguments, the jury could still acquit on the basis that a conviction for criminal damage would, in the circumstances, represent a disproportionate interference with the defendants' right of freedom of expression under Article 10 of the European Convention on Human Rights, as given effect by the Human Rights Act 1998. The jury would have to weigh the importance of property-owners' rights not to have property (e.g. statues) damaged, with the right to freedom of expression.

On 5 January 2022, the jury found the four defendants not guilty of criminal damage by a majority of 11 to 1 after deliberating for three hours. Because juries never provide any rationale or documentation for their verdict, it is unclear which of the defence arguments they found persuasive.

== Reference to the Court of Appeal ==
While stating that "trial by jury is an important guardian of liberty and must not be undermined", Suella Braverman, the attorney general, said she would "carefully consider" whether to refer the case to the Court of Appeal as the result was "causing confusion". The statement referred to the process created by section 36 of the Criminal Justice Act 1972 for the purpose of clarifying points of law after acquittal, which cannot overturn the verdict. Braverman's statement was alleged by former Director of Public Prosecutions, Ken Macdonald, and shadow attorney general, Emily Thornberry, to be politically motivated. However the case was duly referred. The attorney general's questions related solely to the final defence given to the jury to consider, that of whether the defendants' prosecution and conviction were a necessary and proportionate interference with their rights under Articles 9, 10 and 11 of the Convention.

The Court of Appeal found that, whereas previous case law had established that some offences are of such a nature that their prosecution and conviction is always a necessary and proportionate interference with the defendant's Convention rights, criminal damage is not such an offence, since it "encompasses causing damage which is minor or temporary", which Strasbourg case law suggests would require a case-specific proportionality assessment: "scrawling a message on a pavement using water soluble paint might technically be sufficient to sustain a charge of criminal damage ... but to prosecute or convict for doing so as part of a political protest might well be a disproportionate response." Nonetheless, where the conduct alleged was not "peaceful", it was not protected by the Convention, and as such no question of proportionality would arise and the jury should not be directed to consider it:

The Convention does not provide protection to those who cause criminal damage during protest which is violent or not peaceful. Neither does it provide protection when the damage is inflicted violently or not peacefully. Articles 9, 10 and 11 are not engaged in those circumstances and no question of proportionality arises. Moreover, prosecution and conviction for causing significant damage to property, even if inflicted in a way which is "peaceful" could not, in our view, be disproportionate in Convention terms. Given the nature of cases that are heard in the Crown Court it is inevitable that, for one or both of these reasons, the issue should not be left to the jury. That will be because the conduct in question was on any view not peaceful, alternatively the damage was significant, or both.

In relation to the specific circumstances of the Colston case, despite the defendants being allowed as a defence the claim of fact that the statue was not damaged, the court said:

The circumstances in which the statue was damaged did not involve peaceful protest. The toppling of the statute was violent. Moreover, the damage to the statue was significant. On both these bases we conclude that the prosecution was correct in its submission at the abuse hearing that the conduct in question fell outside the protection of the Convention. The proportionality of the conviction could not arise for consideration by the jury.

== See also ==
- Jury nullification
- Blinne Ní Ghrálaigh
