= St Agnes Church, Bristol =

Anglican church in Bristol, England

St Agnes Church
- Church of St Agnes with St Simon
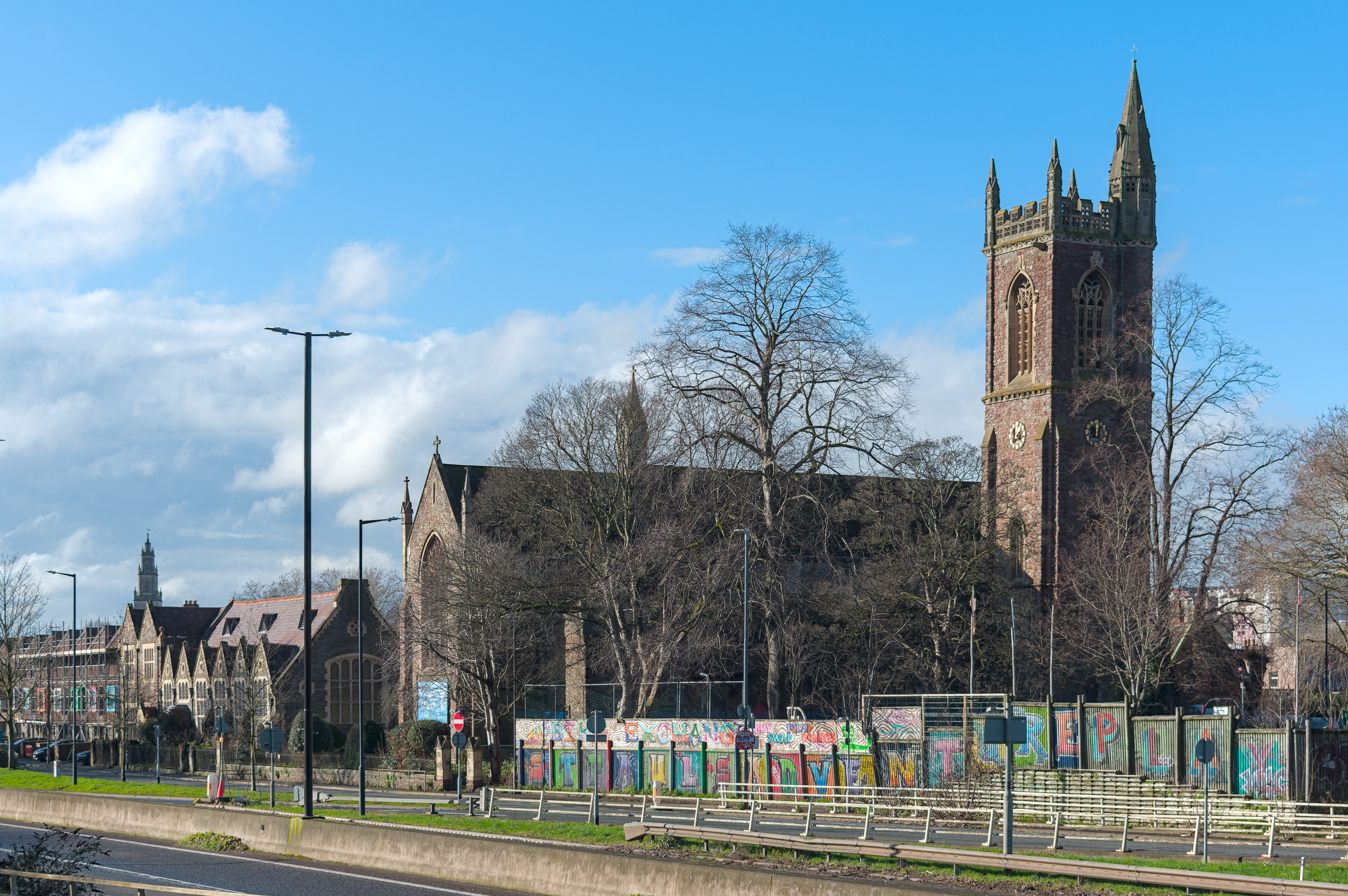
- The church and neighbouring church hall (converted) viewed from Riverside Park on the other side of the M32 motorway
- St Agnes Church
- 51.464430°N 2.577922°W
- Location: St Paul's, Bristol, England
- Denomination: Church of England
- Website: https://www.stagnesbristol.org

History
- Status: Parish Church
- Founder: Clifton College Mission
- Dedication: Agnes of Rome
- Consecrated: 2 March 1886

Architecture
- Architect: W. Wood Bethell
- Style: Decorated Gothic Revival
- Years built: 1885–1887
- Completed: 1886 (consecration)
- Construction cost: £9,520

Specifications
- Capacity: 1,650 (about 1,500 free)

Administration
- Diocese: Diocese of Bristol
- Parish: St Agnes

Clergy
- Vicar: Rev. Melanie Otto

Listed Building – Grade II
- Official name: Church of St Agnes with St Simon
- Designated: 4 March 1977
- Reference no.: 1282074

St Agnes Church is a Church of England parish church in the St Paul's area of Bristol, England. Consecrated in 1886, it was designed by the architect W. Wood Bethell in the Decorated Gothic Revival style. The church originated from an 1870s mission established by Clifton College and is listed on the National Heritage List for England. In 2025, it launched a major appeal for funds to repair its prominent tower, which was reported to be in serious danger of collapsing. The church is on the Heritage at Risk Register.

== History ==
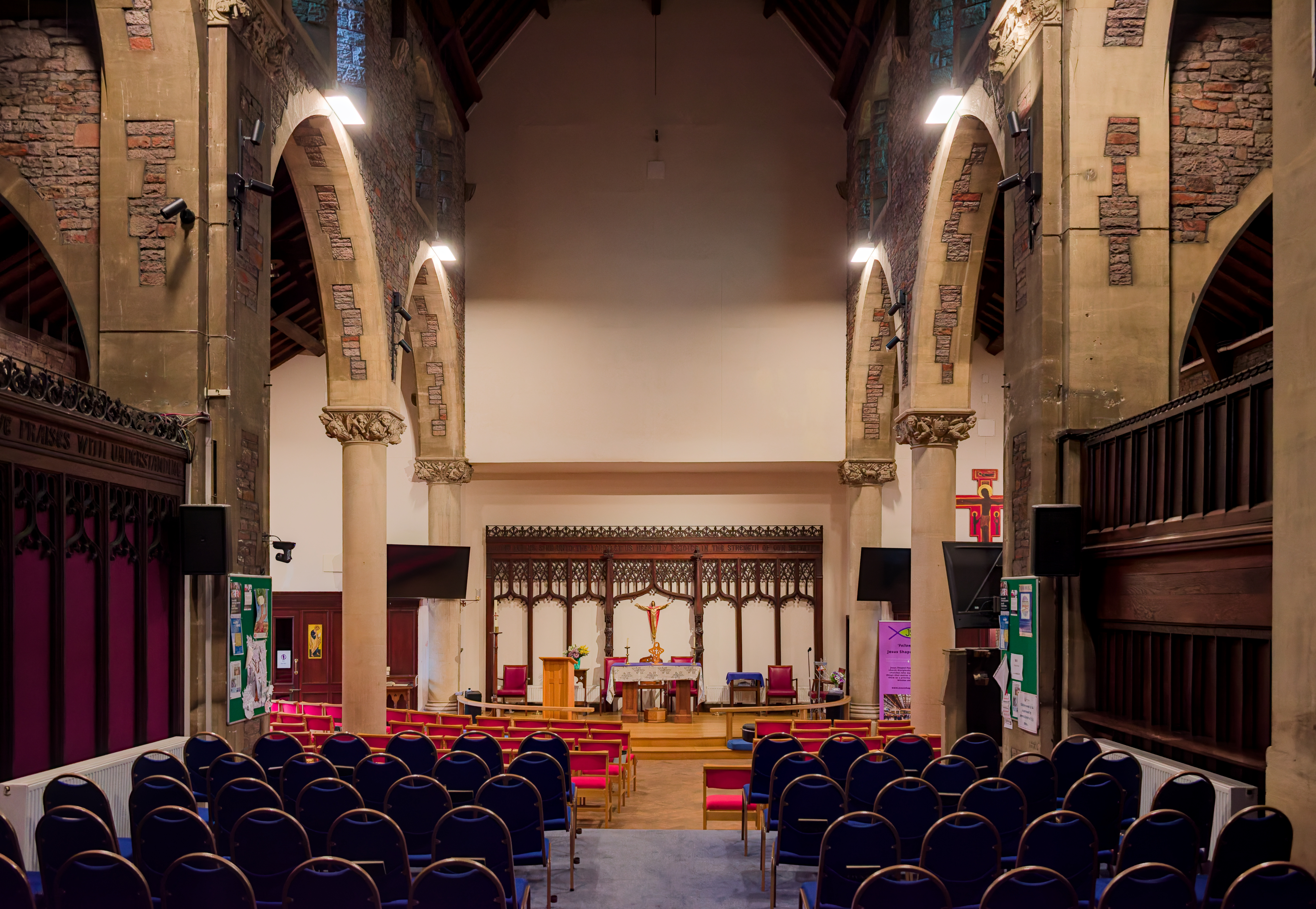
Interior of the church, facing north west

=== Foundation and mission (1869–1885) ===
The origins of the church date to 1869, when John Percival, the headmaster of Clifton College, resolved to use the school's chapel offertories for a mission in a deprived area of Bristol. After initially supporting a ragged school, the College Mission Committee refocused its efforts in 1875 on the large and "neglected" parish of St Barnabas. The district the church now exists in, once known as Newfoundland Gardens, was then described as an area of garden plots inhabited by squatters that had become a "convenient no man's land" for the "roughest class of the population". The specific site chosen for the church was a plot of waste ground that was the regular site of Joe Baker's show, a popular travelling fair and roundabouts.

The mission was officially established in 1876 under its first curate, the Rev. H. D. Rawnsley, in a rented carpenter's shop at 191 Newfoundland Road. Rawnsley later described the difficult conditions of holding services, which were often interrupted by "a fusillade of stones," "cat-calls and whistles," and fights breaking out downstairs. The turning-point for the mission came with the arrival of the Rev. T. W. Harvey in 1880. A new, permanent St Agnes Mission Room was opened in 1882 at a cost of £1,948. The dedication to Agnes of Rome was reportedly chosen by the local people themselves, as they "should like a name new to Bristol, and a 'lady saint.'" An ecclesiastical district was formally created in 1883, followed by the opening of a workmen's club and a games room provided by the college. In January 1885, St Agnes Park was laid out and, along with its lodge, given to the city by the Rev. J. M. Wilson, chairman of the building committee. The establishment of the park was part of the mission's vision driven by the Rev. J. M. Wilson, who provided the land and layout. He intended for the park to serve the spiritual well-being of the parish. The lodge was designed by the architect Charles Hansom, and a straight walkway specifically aligned on the axis of the church's west window to create a visual link between the recreational and spiritual spaces.

The mission's work extended beyond religious services. By 1885, the mission buildings hosted a vast range of social and educational clubs, all managed by committees of their members. These included a mutual improvement and debating society, a dramatic society, a 190-member self-supporting workmen's club, a library, night school classes, a short-hand class, and sports clubs for cricket, swimming, and chess. The mission also ran a "society for promoting cottage and window gardening," reflecting the area's horticultural past.

=== Construction and consecration (1885–1887) ===
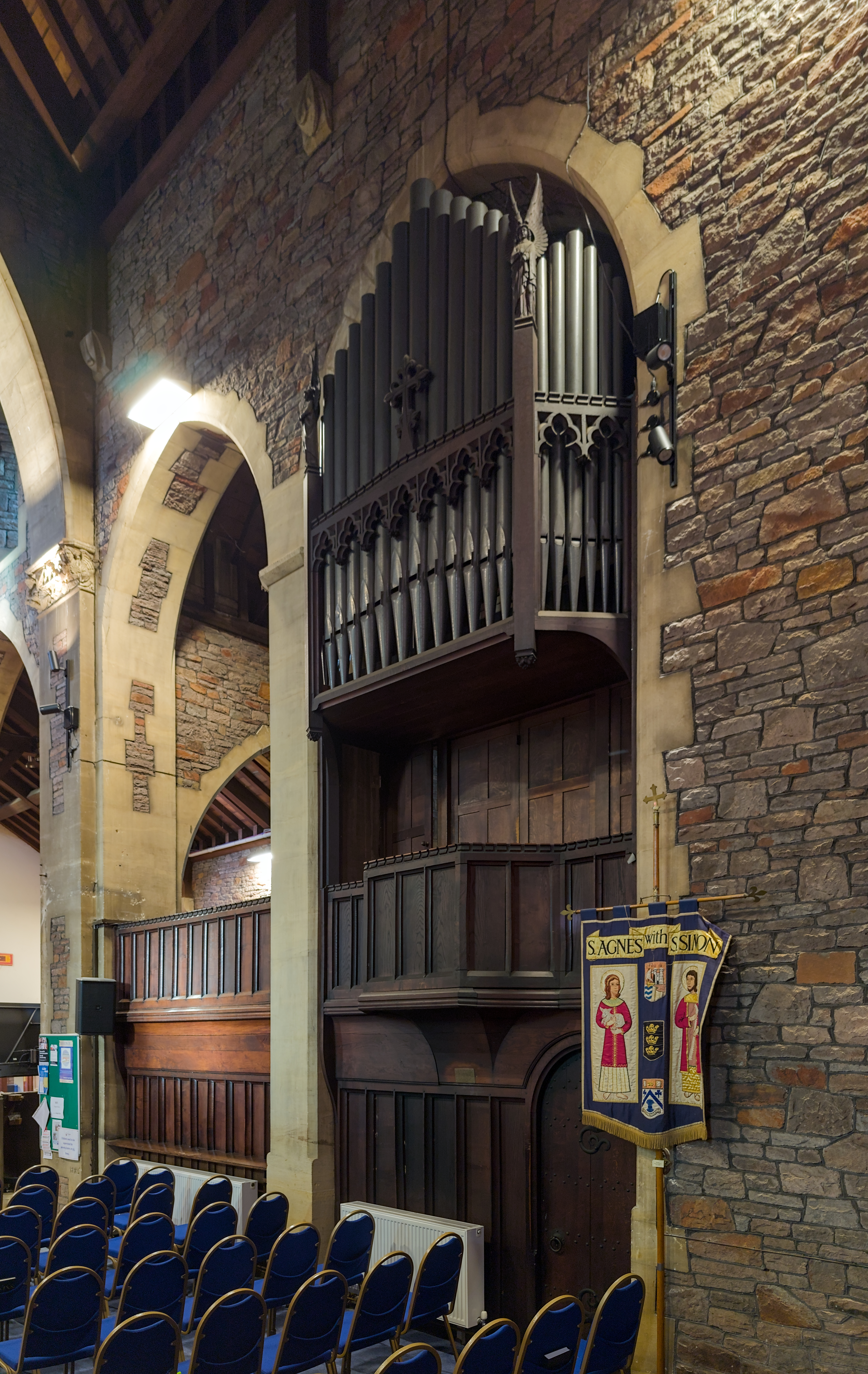
The organ, built by George Johnson and gifted to the church by Clifton College. A brass plaque below it reads: "For the praise of God & the joy of His children this organ was built by George Johnson & given to St Agnes Church by the masters & boys of Clifton College A.D. 1886".

Original dimensions of St Agnes Church
Feature	Dimension
Total internal length	116 feet 9 inches (35.59 m)
Width of nave and aisles	49 feet 4 inches (15.04 m)
Chancel length	33 feet 8 inches (10.26 m)
Chancel width	21 feet 8 inches (6.60 m)
Height of nave to ridge	51 feet 9 inches (15.77 m)

The foundation stone for the permanent church was laid on 20 June 1885 by William Boyd Carpenter, the Bishop of Ripon. The main contract for the building was awarded to Messrs. E. W. R. and Son. Designed by architect W. Wood Bethell, the church was built and consecrated less than a year later, on 2 March 1886, by the Bishop of the Diocese. The Parish of St Agnes was formally constituted at this time. The prominent north-west tower was not part of the initial contract; at the time of consecration in 1886, the tower had only been built "ceiling-high," with the parish needing to raise further funds for its completion. The tower was completed and formally opened on 16 November 1887 by the Bishop of Bedford, Walsham How.

The total cost for the church, tower, site, and fittings was £9,558. This was raised by public subscription, including £3,012 from the Bristol Church Extension Committee, £1,500 from the Rev. J. M. Wilson, and £722 from St Agnes' own collections. The organ was a separate gift from the masters and boys of Clifton College. It was formally opened and dedicated in September 1886, George Johnson of St Paul's as the organ builder and the organ case was designed by the church's architect W. W. Bethell. Several other fittings, including a lectern and the choir furniture, were gifts from Clifton College and local donors during the church's early years.

=== 20th and 21st centuries ===
==== Floods and 1936 Jubilee Fabric Fund ====
The church's location in the floodplain of the River Frome, which made the area "notorious for floods," was a persistent problem. Although the church floor was deliberately built three feet above the ground and higher than the record 1882 flood level, a new record-breaking flood in March 1889 still breached these mitigations. While the church itself only saw water enter the vestry and some other parts, the adjoining St Agnes Mission Hall and Workmen's Club were devastated, with the flood "nearly all the furniture ruined, including two full-sized billiard tables." Volunteers from Clifton College came down to help clean the church interior after a major flood. By the church's 50th jubilee in 1936, the long-term effects of wear and tear and flood damage had taken a serious toll on the parish buildings. A Jubilee Fabric Fund was launched as the parish was facing "heavy expenditure to prevent the collapse of the outer wall of the Church Room and Men's Club."

==== 1991 refurbishment ====
Prior to its major internal conversion, the church housed the first training courses for Fool Time (a precursor to Circomedia), a centre dedicated to circus skills and physical theatre founded by Bim Mason. It was based in the church from 1986 before eventually moving to premises in Kingswood.

By the late 1980s, the church building was suffering from repeated vandalism and was "impossible to heat," with a dwindling congregation. Following the closure of the nearby St Paul's Church and the planned closure of St Werburgh's, St Agnes was designated to serve all three parishes. In 1988, plans were announced for a major development, projected to cost over £750,000, to transform the building. The scheme, designed by Ferguson Mann Architects, involved making the church a dual-purpose everyday building to be open seven days a week. This was achieved by inserting two new floors into the west end of the nave, "trebling the floor area" to create space for community projects, charitable groups, a nursery, and youth provision. While the work was carried out in 1991, the united congregations of St Agnes, St Paul's, and St Werburgh's met for worship at the nearby Parkway Methodist Church.

As part of the 1991 refurbishment, the three western bays of the nave were partitioned off and new floors were inserted. This conversion created the modern community facilities, which include a narthex (entrance hall) at the west door, a main church hall, a kitchen, offices, and toilet facilities. This alteration permanently reduced the main worship area to the eastern bays of the nave and the chancel. By April 1993, this project also included significant landscaping, with a new access ramp and steps to the west door being completed in natural stone.

==== Church silver dispute ====
Funding for the new community centre and associated works became the subject of a significant and contested decision. In 1993, the rector, the Rev. Peter Barnett, petitioned a Church of England consistory court for permission to sell a collection of 17th-century silverware. The items, including a flagon, ewer, and goblet, were not original to St Agnes; they had been donated to the then-redundant St Werburgh's church in 1620 by the merchant venturer Humphrey Brown. Barnett argued that the parish, which faced a deficit, needed the "only lifeline" it had to fund the regeneration. He explicitly described the items as "slave trade treasures" and argued that the wealth created by "black slaves whose forced labour created the wealth" should now be used to benefit his "mainly West Indian flock."

The consistory court authorised the disposal of the items, valued between £350,000 and £500,000, in March 1993. The ruling allowed Bristol City Council and other institutions until October 1994 to raise the necessary funds before the collection could be sold on the open market. A city-wide appeal subsequently secured £322,000 by March 1995, enabling the silver to be purchased for the Bristol Museum & Art Gallery.

==== 21st century ====
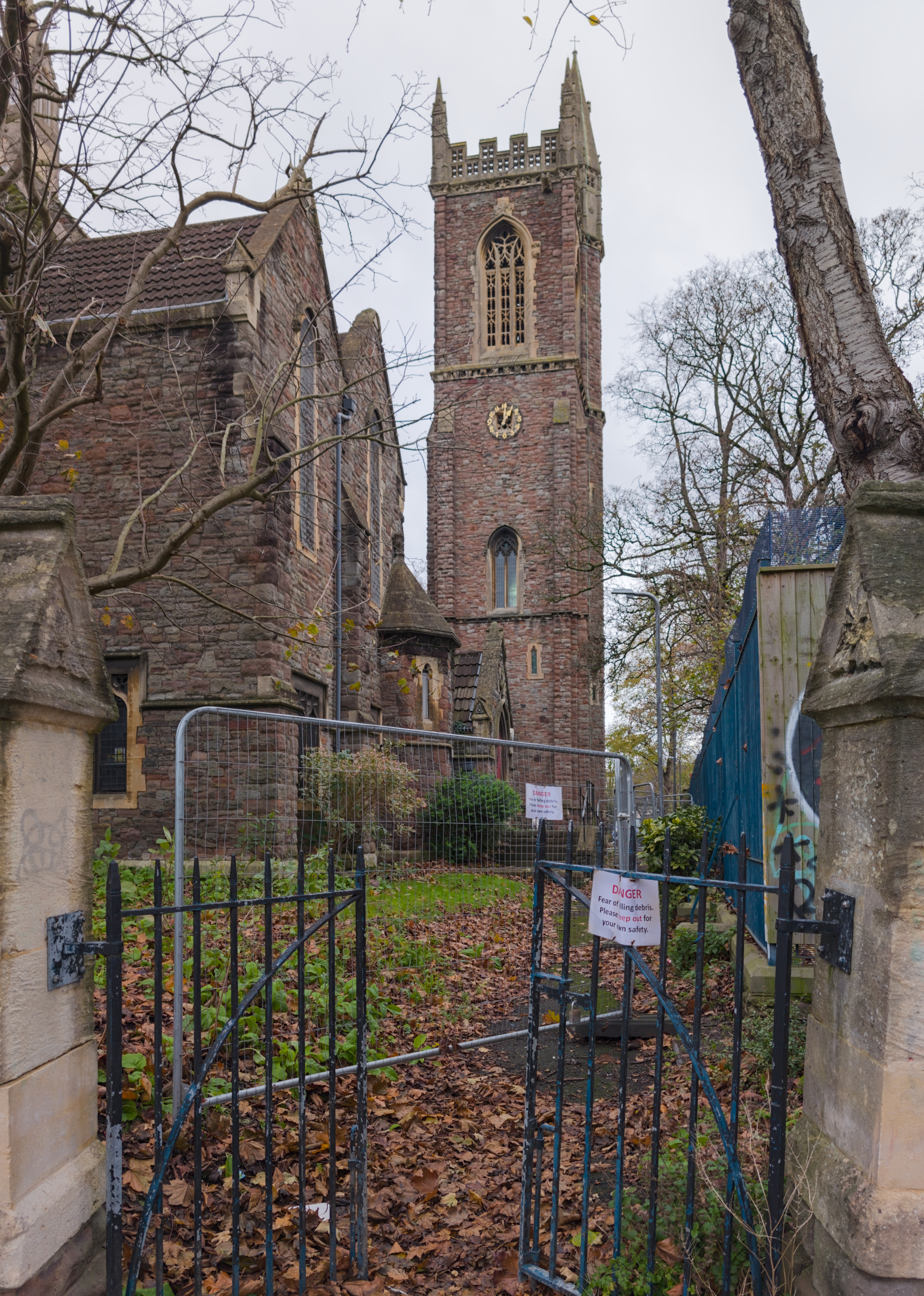
The footpath on the eastern side of the church has been closed due to falling masonry from the tower

For many years, the parish's community outreach was led by the honorary curate Paul Bartle-Jenkins, known locally as "Father Paul". A prominent figure in St Paul's, Bartle-Jenkins was part of strengthening the church's relationship with the local Afro-Caribbean population, conducting funerals and providing mentorship to young men in the district, including those in young offenders' institutes. He was also noted for teaching Black history in local schools at a time when it was not part of the standard curriculum.

The Rev. Melanie Otto has served as vicar since 2021. In 2024, the church and its congregation were involved in community efforts concerning the adjacent St Pauls Adventure Playground. Rev. Otto highlighted the community's desperate need for the closed playground to reopen as a "safe space" for children. In October 2024, St Agnes Church announced it was organising "working party" volunteer sessions to clean up the site, as the playground's sole director was also a member of the church's congregation.

In July 2025, the church launched an urgent appeal for £250,000 to repair its tower, which was described as being in "serious danger of collapsing." Falling masonry had already forced the closure of an adjacent alleyway, and a wooden porch was erected over the main entrance to protect the public. Rev. Otto stated the church was "at the heart of the Windrush community" and criticised the Church of England for a lack of direct funding, calling the situation a "racial justice issue" and highlighting decades of neglect in the St Paul's area. She contrasted the lack of support with the major repairs being funded by the Diocese at All Saints Church on Corn Street, a church with no congregation.

== Architecture and fittings ==
The southeast window of St Agnes Church, depicting the crucifixion of Jesus.

The architect was W. Wood Bethell of Westminster. The walls are built of Stapleton stone with Pennant and Bath stone dressings. To combat the flood risk from the River Frome, the main floor was constructed three feet above the average ground level, placing it higher than the record flood level of 1882.

The exterior is dominated by a high north-west tower constructed of pink sandstone with "inventive, flamboyant" tracery. It is surmounted by a prominent spirelet rising from a stairway turret, a feature characteristic of the Bristol style of Gothic architecture.

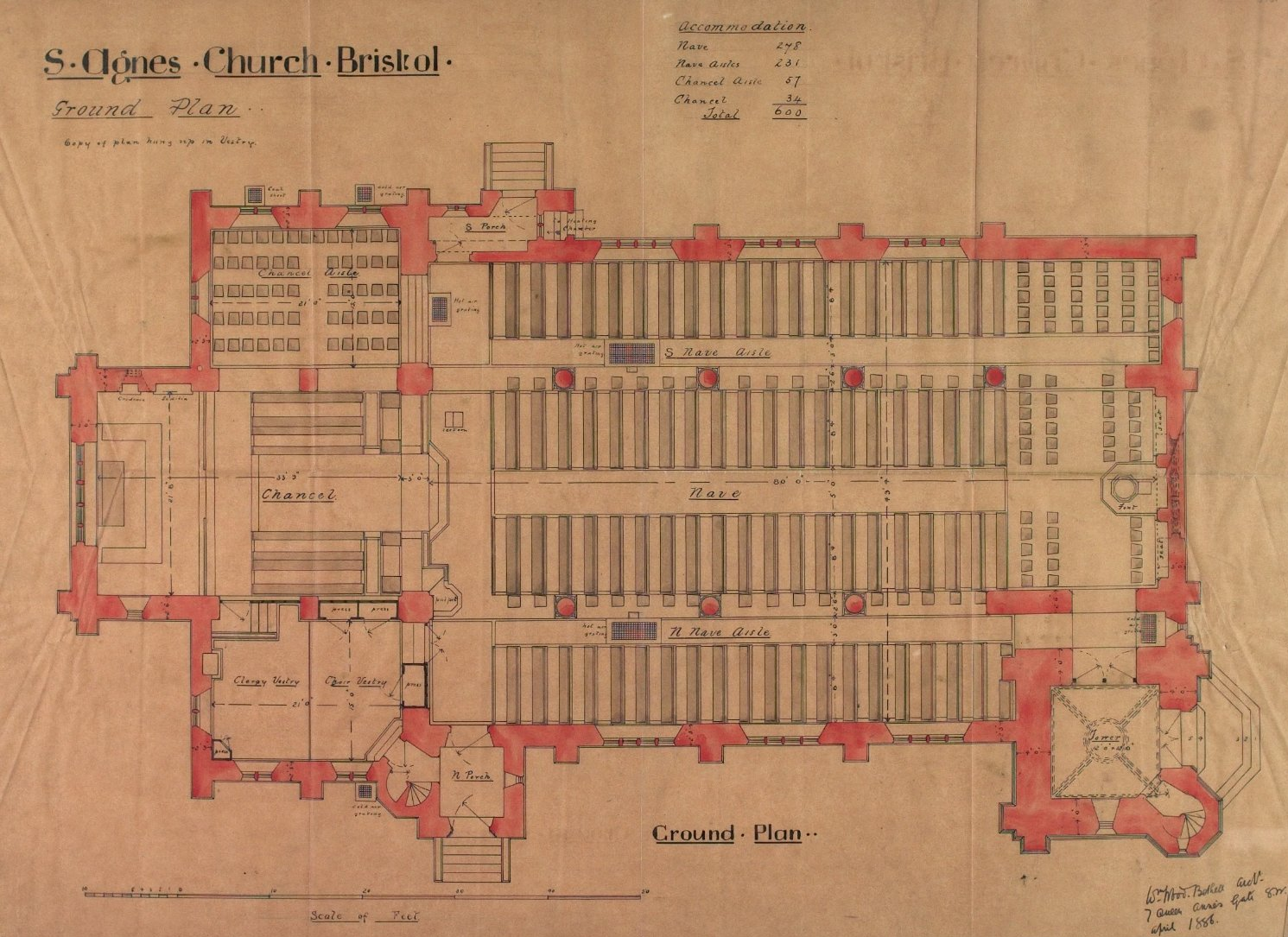
The floorplan of the church by W. Wood Bethell, 1886. All the areas to the right of the transept have since been converted into community and office spaces.

The interior is described by the architectural historian Nikolaus Pevsner as "unmistakably eclectic", distinguished by a very high nave and bold arcades of square section with small chamfers. The nave piers are tall and cylindrical, contrasting with their square capitals which are richly carved with figures. The capitals on the south aisle represent the Old and New Testament, with carvings representing the patriarchs, prophets, apostles, and evangelists. The capitals on the north aisle depict different periods of English ecclesiastical history, beginning with the first English martyr, St Alban, and including modern figures such as John Wesley, Bishop Patteson, and Bishop Wordsworth of Lincoln. Above the nave, the roof construction features close-set collars, that in the view of Andor Gomme, create an impression of "three-dimensional solidity".

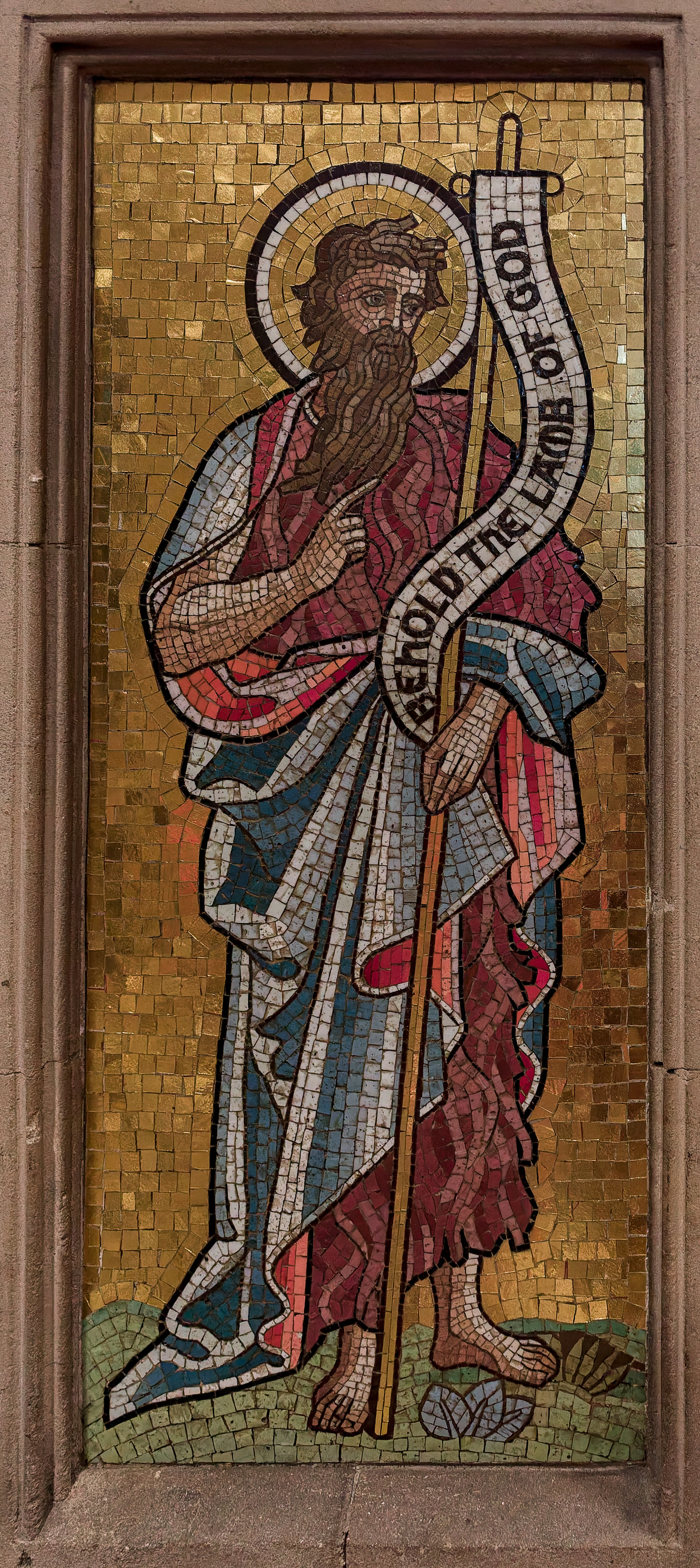
Saint John the Baptist

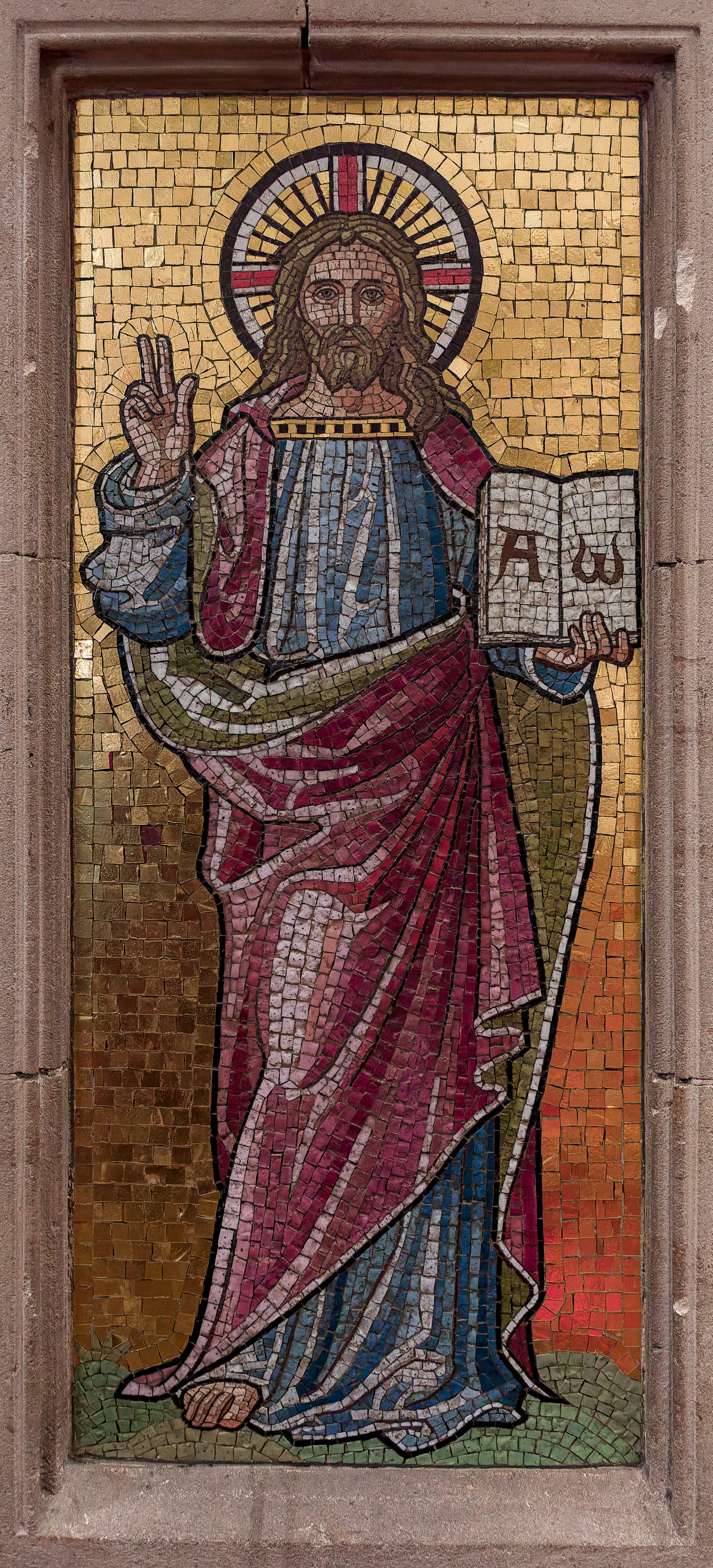
Christ in Majesty

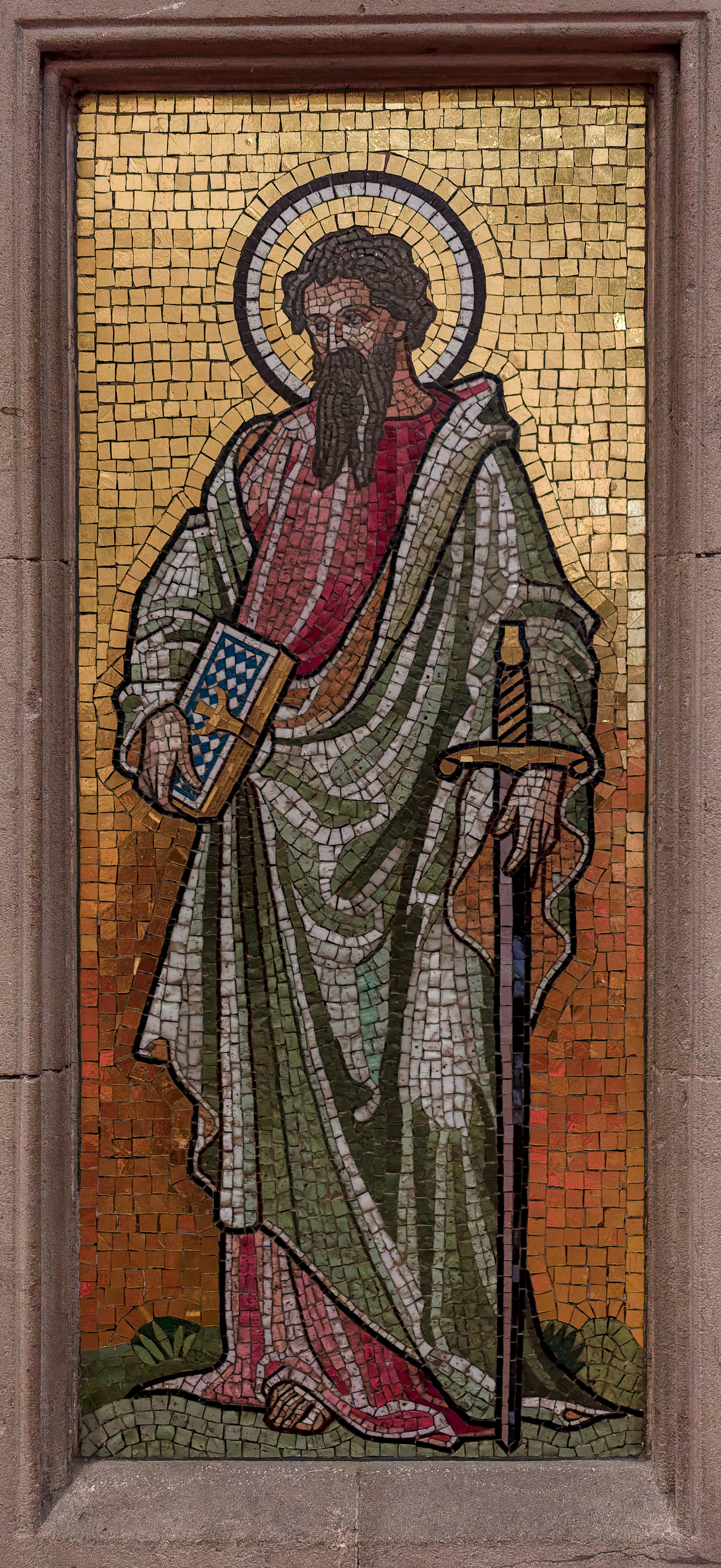
Saint Paul the Apostle

The three glass mosaic panels of the pulpit

Other fittings include a stone octagonal pulpit with mosaic panels and Tudor roses, and a chancel containing a piscina and sedilia. The mosaics on the font and the chancel floor are made of marble and were laid by Italian workmen. In contrast, the panels of the pulpit were decorated in late 1886 with glass, a style that was reportedly the first of its kind in Bristol. The original prayer desks were carved from oak by the choirmaster, W. Wilmut, and a Mr. Shepherd, and feature "skilfully-carved archangels."

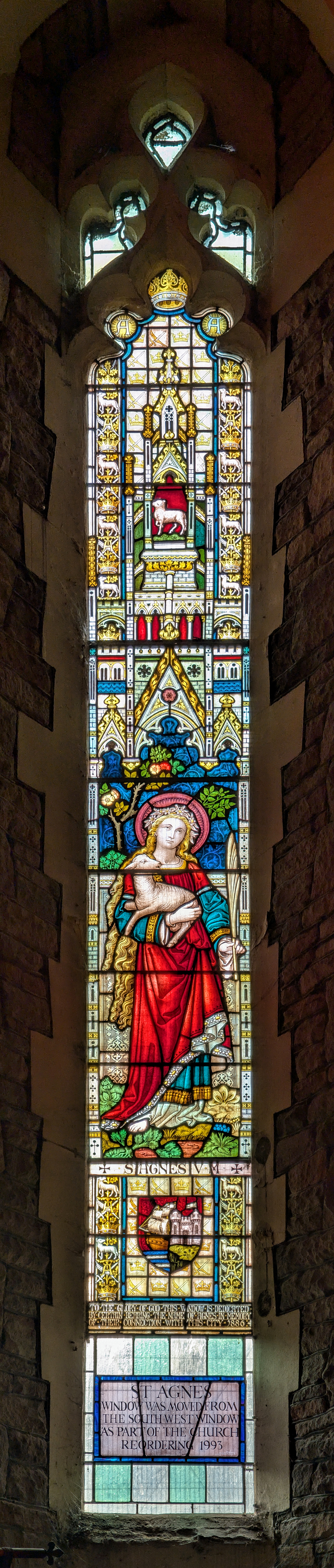
Stained-glass window depicting Agnes of Rome holding a lamb.

At its 1886 consecration, several windows were already in place, all designed by the Bristol-born artist Alfred Octavius Hemming of Westminster. A single-light window at the west end of the south aisle depicted the patron saint, Agnes of Rome carrying a lamb, with the coat of arms of Bristol in the lower panel; this was dedicated by "certain women connected with Bristol, bearing the name of Agnes." A double-light window at the east end was dedicated by the teachers and scholars of the St Agnes Sunday School and depicted "Christ the Good Shepherd" and "Christ blessing little children."

A large oak reredos and screen were dedicated in the chancel in May 1900. They were designed by the church's original architect, W. Wood Bethell, as a memorial to Archdeacon J. M. Wilson The reredos features a large, painted centre panel of the Lord's Supper. The side panels depict "types of Christians of the past age" (a Crusader, a monk, and a Syrian) and "types of the present age" (a Bishop, a soldier, and a "club boy," representing the church's mission). Like the glass, the paintings were done by Alfred Octavius Hemming. The screen is an artistically carved oak structure featuring figures of Saint John and Saint Peter, with carving by William Wilmutt of Bristol. At the same time, a new litany desk, designed to match the screen, was dedicated as a memorial by the curate, Rollestone Fyffe.

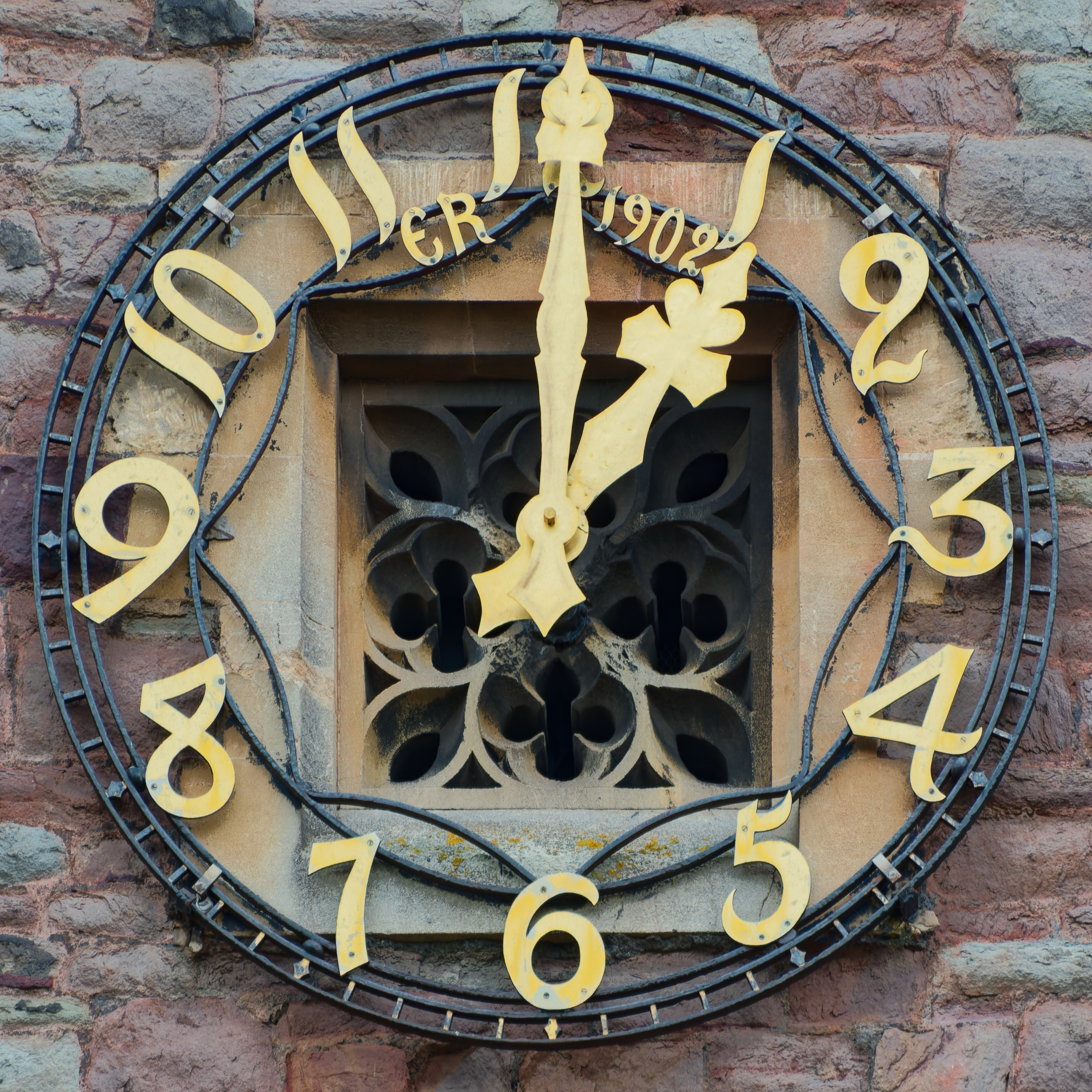
The north-west face of the clock installed to commemorate Edward VII's coronation

A clock was installed in the tower to commemorate the coronation of Edward VII. The project, which cost £100, was funded by voluntary subscriptions from parishioners. The clock, supplied by Messrs Dell and Co. of Bristol, was officially started by the Lord Mayor of Bristol on New Year's Day, 1903. It was designed with four dials, to strike the hours and half-hours on the church's tubular bells.

In 1913, a two-light memorial window was dedicated in the side chapel by Rollestone Fyffe, the Bishop of Rangoon and a former vicar. The window commemorates the church's first vicar, the Rev. T. W. Harvey, and his wife. Designed by the firm of Percy Bacon Brothers of London, the lights depict figures of Justice and Mercy. Justice is shown as a man with a sword, trampling a scroll inscribed with "Oppression," "Injustice," and "Greed," while Mercy is a woman holding a child. The window features the symbols of a pair of scales and a flaming heart, along with a quote from the prophet Micah.

== See also ==
- Grade II listed buildings in Bristol
- Churches in Bristol

Other churches that are members of Ashley Churches Together Serving:

- City Road Baptist Church
- Ivy Pentecostal Church
- Parkway Methodist Church
- St Nicholas of Tolentino Church
