= Ivy Pentecostal Church =

Pentecostal church in Bristol, England

- Ivy Full Gospel Church
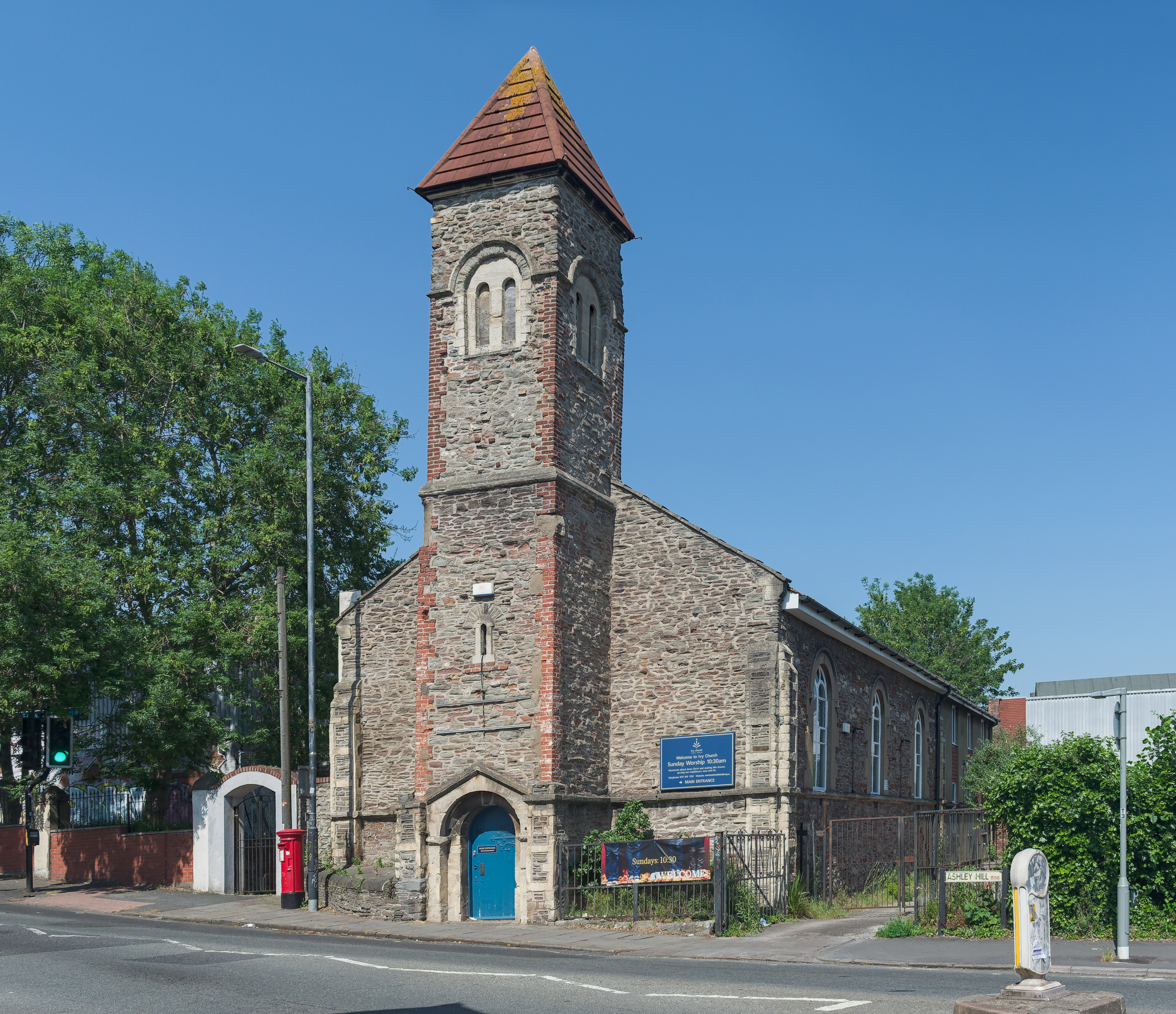
- Ivy Pentecostal Church
- 51.46876°N 2.57930°W
- Location: Montpelier, Bristol
- Country: England
- Denomination: Assemblies of God
- Previous denomination: Church of England
- Website: www.ivychurchbristol.org.uk

History
- Former name(s): Chapel of the Asylum for Poor Orphan Girls, Blue Maids' Chapel, Orphan Asylum Church
- Earlier dedication: Mary Magdalene
- Consecrated: 1827

Architecture
- Style: Italianate and Romanesque Revival
- Completed: c. 1791, rebuilt c. 1827

Locally Listed Building
- Official name: Ivy Church, Ashley Hill
- Designated: 1 September 2016
- Reference no.: 367

Ivy Pentecostal Church, formerly the Chapel of the Asylum for Poor Orphan Girls, is a Pentecostal church located on Ashley Hill on the border of the Montpelier and St Werburgh's districts of Bristol, England. Originally established in the late 18th century as a place of worship for the Magdalen Charity and later Blue Maids' Orphanage in Ashley Manor House, the building has served as a Pentecostal church since the late 1930s. The building has been identified as a local landmark within the Montpelier Conservation Area and is on the Bristol Local List.

== History ==
=== Asylum for Poor Orphan Girls ===
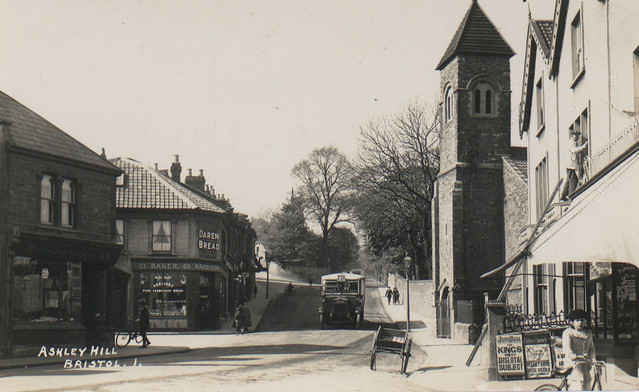
A postcard from c. 1910 showing the bottom of Ashley Hill, with the Blue Maids' Chapel visible on the right

The ecclesiastical history of the site dates to the late 18th century. In 1791, the Ashley Manor House, a Tudor property located at the foot of Ashley Hill, was leased to the Magdalen Charity, an institution established for the reformation of "deluded common women". A chapel, positioned just in front of the manor, was consecrated for this charity in 1792. By 1795, the site had transitioned into the Asylum for Poor Orphan Girls (also known as the Blue Maids' Orphanage) of Ashley Down, which was founded to aid girls who had lost both parents. The institution aimed to rescue orphaned girls from "idleness and vice", training them for domestic service until the age of sixteen. The orphanage maintained strict admission criteria, accepting only girls aged between nine and twelve who had lost both parents, and unlike the nearby Müller's Orphanage refused to admit illegitimate children. It also excluded children who were black or those with disabilities.

While ecclesiastical records and directories often cite a 1791 construction date for the chapel, aligning with the creation of the earlier Magdalen Charity, structural and historiographical evidence suggests the present building is largely a 19th-century reconstruction. The orphanage complex at Hook's Mills underwent substantial rebuilding in the late 1820s, as the existing premises had become unsafe. In August 1827, the Lord Mayor of Bristol, Mr. T. Camplin, laid the foundation stone for a new asylum building at Hook's Mills, replacing the older facilities. The chapel attached to this new complex was consecrated shortly thereafter by the Bishop of Bristol. By the early 19th century, the orphanage housed approximately 50 girls and was supported entirely by voluntary contributions. The girls were responsible for the upkeep of the chapel, including decorating the interior and manually pumping the organ during services. In August 1827, as fundraising for a new orphanage building was underway, the Bishop of the diocese preached at St Paul's Church and a collection was taken towards the building fund. Contemporary reports from this time noted that residents of the growing neighbourhood attended worship at the asylum chapel by this point. In 1849 the chapel was repaired and refitted following reports that parts of the interior were in poor condition, including floor failure attributed to dry rot. The chapel was reopened for services the following day on 3 November 1849, with collections taken towards the renovation fund.

During the mid-19th century, the chapel became a place of worship for Henry Parker, a slave who fled a Florida plantation and had settled in Bristol. Parker eventually served as a lay preacher at the church.

During the late 19th century, the chapel was utilised by the St Werburgh's parish men's Bible class, which met there for a decade until 1891. In 1890 the St Werburgh's parish men's Bible class reported that it had met for ten years in the Hook's Mills Orphan Asylum Chapel at Ashley Hill, but expected the chapel to be needed for Sunday afternoon services. The report notes that the class consequently purchased and altered a property at 1 Sussex Place for its meetings.

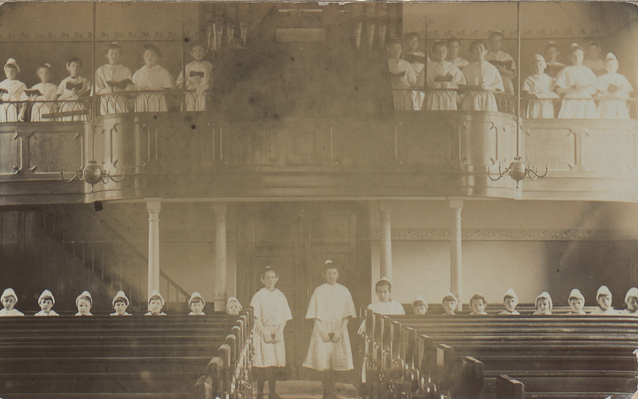
1907 postcard showing Blue Maids inside the asylum chapel

Contemporary correspondence indicates that the name "Ivy Church" was in informal use by the late 19th century, being derived from the ivy growing on the front of the building, though it was not universally accepted. In April 1889 a letter by R. D. Robjent to the Evening Post questioned why the chapel was being listed as "Ivy Church, Hook's Mills", arguing that the name did not reflect its role as the orphanage chapel and noting that directories used "Orphan Asylum Church". A subsequent reply by the Rev. Pitt Eykyn, formerly of St Francis', confirmed that the chapel was dedicated to St Mary Magdalene and agreed that "Ivy Church" was an inappropriate name for the church.

The orphanage continued to hold annual services and meetings at the chapel into the 20th century. In 1905 a thanksgiving service was followed by the institution's annual meeting, where supporters discussed subscriptions, expenditure, and ongoing efforts to reduce a deficit on the chapel and general accounts. In 1916 the guardians gave notice that they would propose altering the institution's official name from the Asylum for Poor Orphan Girls to Orphanage (The Blue Maids) The Hook's Mills (Church of England), or a modification of that wording, at a quarterly board meeting. The property was sold by the orphanage trustees in 1933, shortly before its registration as a Pentecostal place of worship.

=== Pentecostal era ===
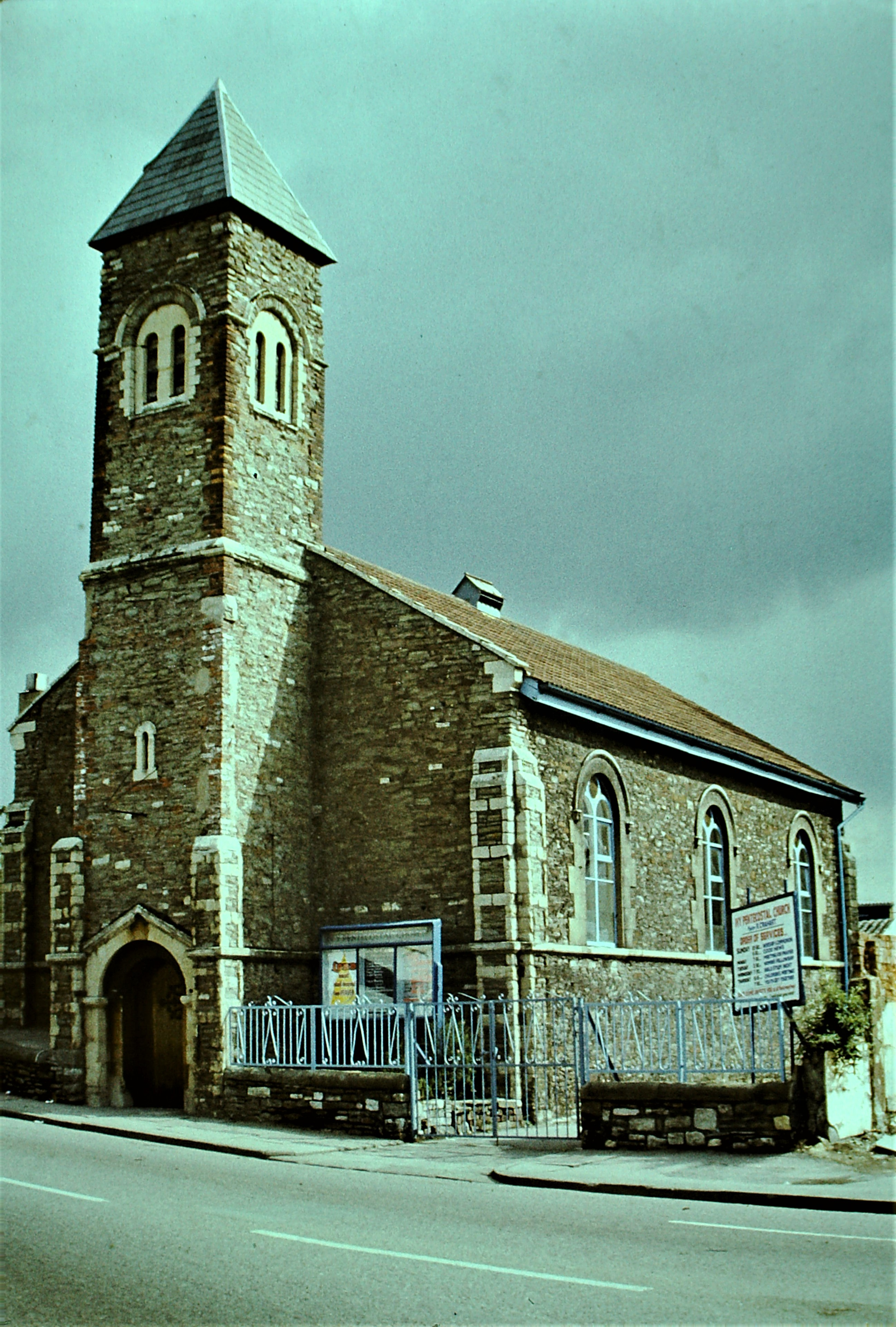
The church in August 1978

Despite the demolition of the adjacent orphanage in the early 20th century, the site of which became the Ashley Hill Trading Estate, the chapel survived. Following the closure of the orphanage in 1927, the main asylum buildings were acquired by the Salvation Army. The site was reopened in 1928 by Dame Clara Butt as the Mount Hope maternity home. The church was later registered for the solemnisation of marriages on 5 April 1938, under the name Ivy Full Gospel Church, serving a congregation of the Assemblies of God. By the 1960s the church was used as a venue for regional Pentecostal gatherings, including conventions attended by visiting speakers and performers from outside Bristol. The congregation supported overseas mission work, including sponsorship of members travelling to Pentecostal mission schools abroad. In 1963 the church saw off a Bristol teacher leaving for a three-year post at a Pentecostal mission school in the Kivu Province in the Congo, with members of other Assemblies of God churches also attending.

== Community and ministry ==
The church is affiliated with the Assemblies of God in Great Britain and maintains an active ministry involving worship, prayer, and community outreach. It has participated in wider city initiatives such as The Noise (a local community action project) and youth events such as Soul Survivor. The congregation has historically been diverse, described in 2003 as consisting of black and white members worshipping together. The church has also utilised its premises for use as a polling station.

Following World War II, the church saw a period of stability under Pastor E. C. Crew, who served as minister for over 15 years from the mid-1940s. During his tenure, the church expanded its influence, notably establishing a new Sunday school and church plant in Henbury in the late 1950s. The church became a hub for regional Pentecostal events, hosting conventions with guest speakers such as Donald Gee, Chairman of the World Pentecostal Churches, in 1961.

The church has a long history of evangelistic activity. In the 1950s, it held healing crusades and baptismal services which reported "miraculous cures". During the 1960s, the congregation's youth groups were active supporters of the Billy Graham crusades, volunteering administrative support for his Bristol visits. The church also hosted various itinerant evangelists, including Francis Lamming (known as "Uncle Francis") in the 1960s and the faith healer Rev. Melvin Banks in 1999.

Under the leadership of Rev. Duncan Franklin in the 1990s, the church engaged in humanitarian aid work in Russia following the fall of communism, delivering medical supplies and supporting new churches. The church has also provided a platform for international speakers discussing political and social justice, such as Zimbabwean freedom fighter Stephen Lungu and the Rwandan minister Rev. Stephen Nahimana following the Rwandan genocide.

== Architecture and fittings ==
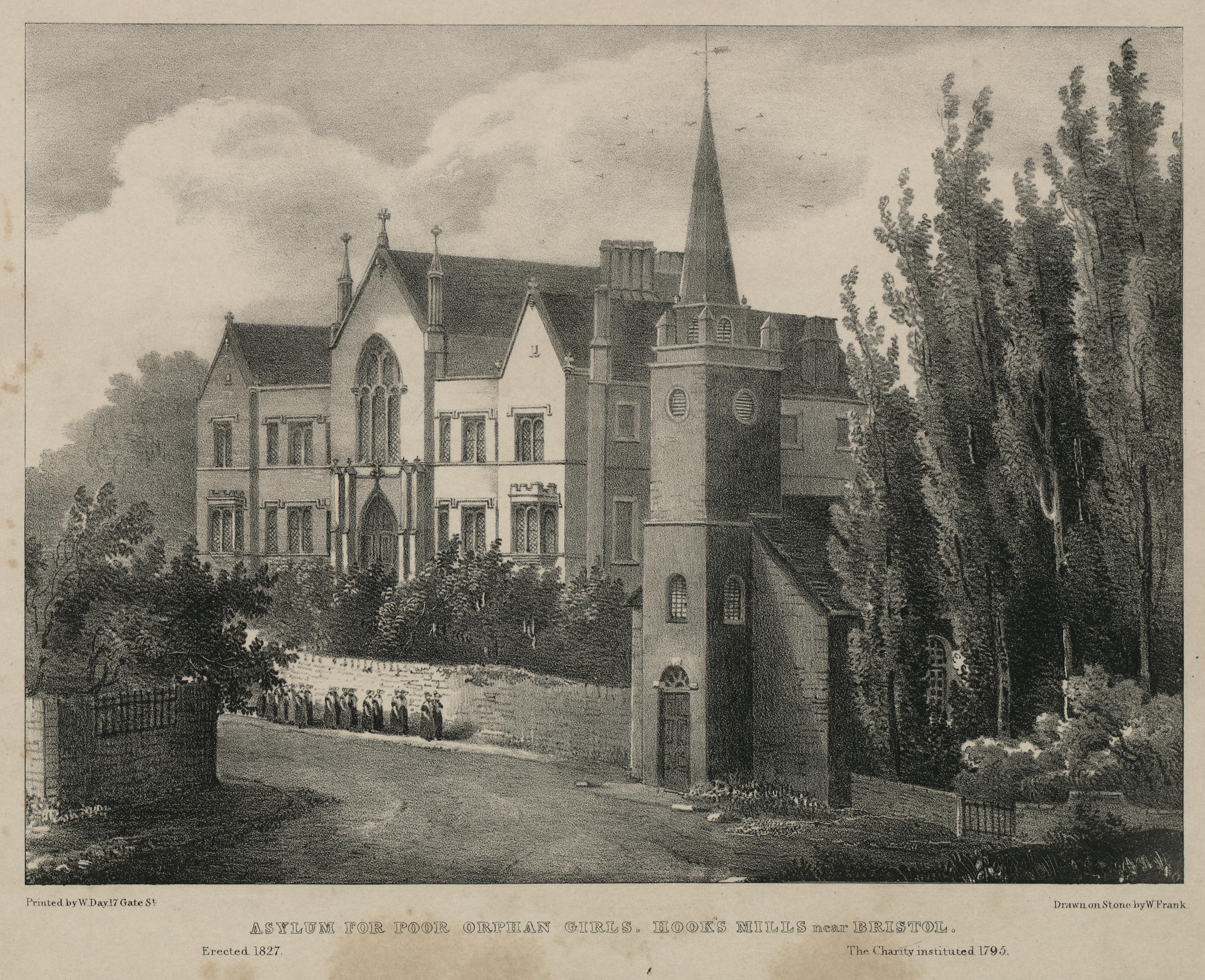
An 1827 engraving by W. Frank showing the Ashley Manor House, then occupied by the Blue Maids' Orphanage, and the church associated with the institution

The building is constructed of Pennant rubble with red brick dressings and plain quoins. Described by Nikolaus Pevsner as "small and crude", the fabric is originally of 1791–2 but the exterior character is dominated by 19th-century alterations. The narrow, unbuttressed west tower, originally topped by a slender needle spire, is now capped by a shallow pyramidal roof. The belfry stage is pierced by paired Romanesque lights, which replaced earlier oculi.

The nave is of three bays, fenestrated with plain round-headed lancets of an early 19th-century type. The tower profile is reminiscent of a campanile, with further Italianate influence visible in the treatment of the curtilage, which features a whitewashed archway and wrought-iron gate. In 1865 a new altar cloth was reported as being prepared for the church, made and embroidered locally by two sisters who ran a Berlin wool and silk depot in Stokes Croft.

The chapel underwent periodic internal alterations and repairs in the early 20th century. In 1913 improvements were made by rearranging the seating, which was marked by special services. In 1917 the Blue Maids' Chapel was reported to have reopened after restoration and renovation costing £150.

In the mid-1980s the church carried out a major remodelling and extension programme intended to improve accommodation for a growing congregation. In 1984 Bristol planners approved proposals for new ancillary facilities, including additional halls with kitchen and toilets, to be built to the rear of the church after demolition of outbuildings. During the same works, the church replaced a prefabricated centre with a new building and buried a time capsule in the foundations containing the names of 150 congregants alongside a short history and statement of beliefs, sealed during a dedication service led from the foundation trench. The enlarged and remodelled sanctuary opened in August 1985 after a four-day series of events; contemporary reports put the cost of the project at £60,000 and noted the Lord Mayor attending.

In 2007 and 2008, the prominence of the church within the conservation area was the subject of a community campaign regarding three large billboards located at the junction of Ashley Hill and Sevier Street. Local residents and councillors argued that the billboards, which had been in place for over 20 years on land owned by the Children's Scrapstore charity, obscured the view of the church and posed a distraction to drivers. Following a petition signed by 1,000 people and a 24-hour vigil held by a local campaigner in 2007, Bristol City Council prepared a discontinuance notice against the displays. The hoardings were removed in late 2008 after the landowner secured alternative funding and terminated the advertising contract.

== See also ==
- List of churches in Bristol

Other churches that are members of Ashley Churches Together Serving:

- City Road Baptist Church
- Parkway Methodist Church
- St Agnes Church
- St Nicholas of Tolentino Church
