= Parkway Methodist Church, Bristol =

Methodist church in Bristol, England

Parkway Methodist Church
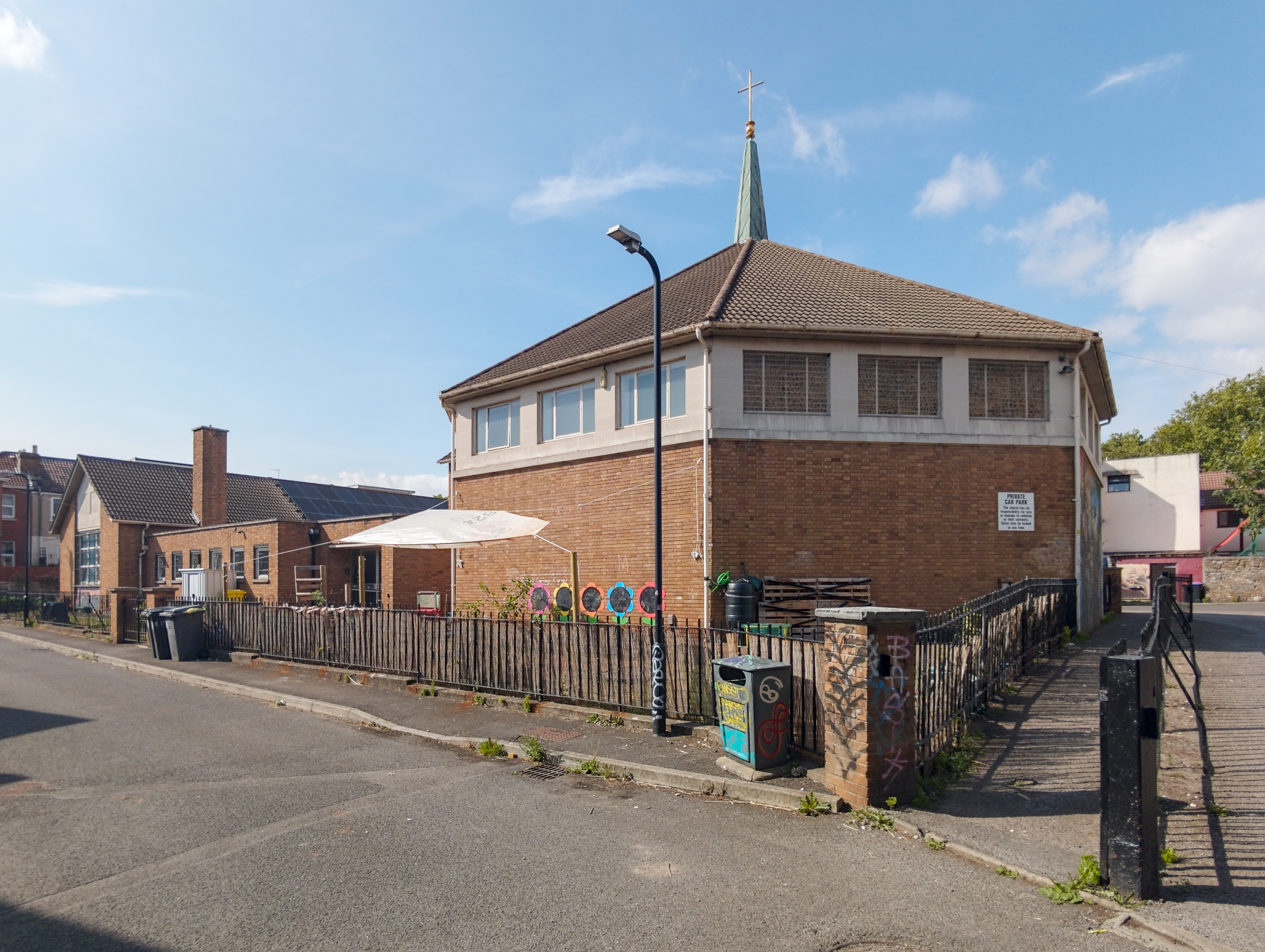
- Parkway Methodist Church
- 51.46703°N 2.57600°W
- Location: St Werburghs, Bristol
- Country: England
- Denomination: Methodist
- Website: www.parkwaymethodistschurch.org.uk

History
- Status: Active
- Dedicated: 21 August 1971

Architecture
- Architect: Eustace Button
- Architectural type: Modern
- Groundbreaking: 26 September 1970
- Completed: 1971

Specifications
- Capacity: 120

Parkway Methodist Church is a Methodist church located in Conduit Place in the St Werburghs area of Bristol, England. Constructed between 1970 and 1971, the building is architecturally distinct for its octagonal plan. It was established to replace two earlier chapels, Wesley and Brookland, that were demolished to accommodate the construction of the M32 motorway.

Historically, the building has served as a civic and religious hub for the St Paul's and St Werburgh's districts, and is part of the local Afro-Caribbean community. It has facilitated ecumenical worship by hosting displaced Anglican congregations and has been a venue for significant social activism, including parliamentary inquiries into racial justice following the 1980 St Pauls riot.

== History ==
=== Origins and construction ===
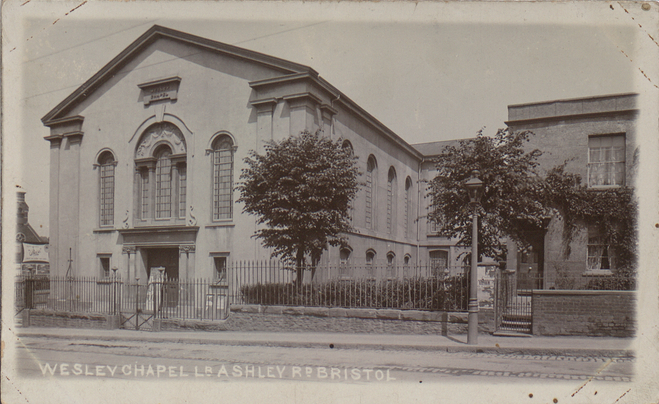
The Wesley Chapel on Lower Ashley Road, one of the predecessors of Parkway Methodist Church that was demolished for the motorway

During the 1960s and 1970s, Bristol's urban geography was radically altered by the "Parkway scheme" (now the M32 motorway). The construction severed Lower Ashley Road, creating a physical barrier between the neighbourhoods of St Paul's, St Werburgh's, and Easton. This infrastructure project necessitated the compulsory purchase and demolition of numerous properties, including two Methodist places of worship: the Wesley Chapel at Baptist Mills and the Brookland Church on Lower Ashley Road.

The Wesley Chapel closed in December 1969; its members subsequently joined the Brookland congregation while plans were developed for a combined replacement church. The project for the new church was financed through compensation funds provided by Bristol City Council and the Ministry of Transport. Early designs for the site outlined an eight-sided sanctuary accompanied by a churchyard, vestries, and multiple rooms for Sunday school and fellowship activities.

On 26 September 1970, the foundation stone was laid by Alderman Percy Cann, a long-standing member of the Brookland church, and Ada Netcott of the Wesley Chapel. The completed building was dedicated on 21 August 1971 by the Rev. Leslie M. Wollen, Chairman of the Bristol Methodist District. The opening ceremony included clergy from the Anglican and Roman Catholic traditions, organised to denote the church's intended role as a centre for ecumenical cooperation. During the ceremony, the former chairman of the Wesley Trust, Walter F. Thorns, received the key, and Percy Cann formally opened the doors. In 1975, a plaque was installed to mark the vicinity where the Methodist leader John Wesley first preached in 1739. The building was registered for the solemnisation of marriages in July 1971.

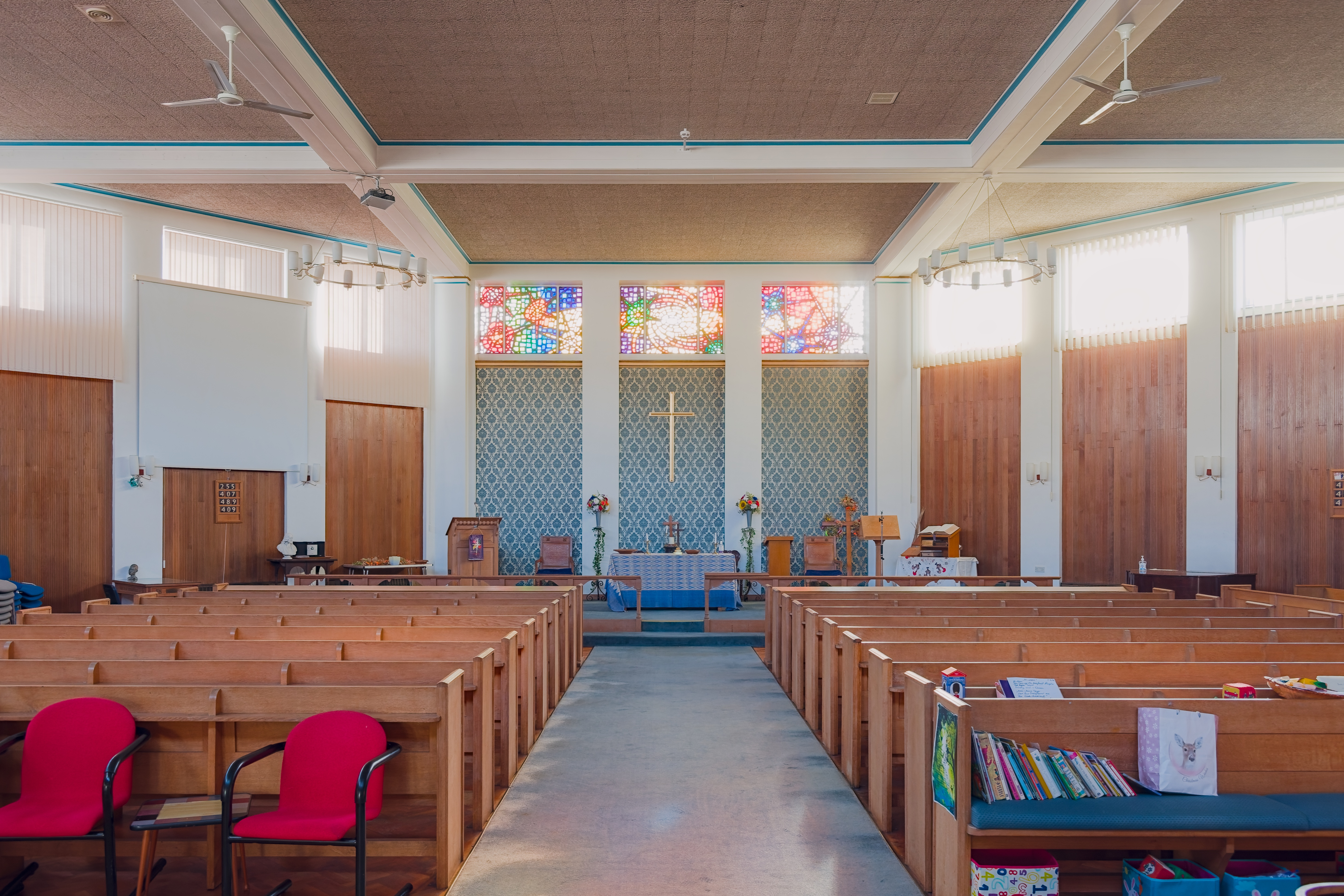
Interior of the church, looking southeast toward the sanctuary

=== Ecumenical partnership ===
Parkway was promoted as Bristol's first purpose-built "shared" church. While the property is owned by the Methodist Church, it was designed to accommodate the Church of England as a key component of the newly formed St Paul's Ecumenical Parish, inaugurated in October 1970.

Throughout its history, the church has functioned as a sanctuary for Anglican congregations displaced by building closures or maintenance work. In 1988, following the closure of St Paul's Church in Portland Square and the redundancy of St Werburgh's in Mina Road, the congregations moved their worship to Parkway. The church also hosted the congregation of St Agnes during the late 1980s and early 1990s, while their own building underwent a £200,000 renovation to address heating failures and a leaking roof. In 1990, a combined congregation held a Pentecost service at Parkway before processing to St Agnes to mark the progress of the renovations.

== Community and ministry ==
=== Social engagement ===
Parkway Methodist Church has often been utilised as a space to address socio-political issues within the inner city. The demolition of the predecessor chapels took place during growing local opposition to Bristol's post-war road-building programme. While the clearance of Lower Ashley Road for the Parkway scheme had already reshaped the area by the late 1960s, proposals for an extended Outer Circuit Road provoked sustained resistance from residents of St Paul's and Montpelier during the early 1970s. Community meetings and protest gatherings were frequently held in the newly opened Parkway Methodist Church hall. In January 1973, the St Paul's and Montpelier Action Group formally organised a petition during a meeting at the church, opposing the routing of the Outer Circuit Road through Lower Ashley Road and adjoining neighbourhoods, citing the loss of housing, community centres, and environmental degradation caused by earlier motorway construction. Methodist representatives at Parkway supported the campaign by hosting meetings and agreeing to circulate petitions.

In the aftermath of the St Paul's riots in 1980, the House of Commons Select Committee on Race Relations and Immigration visited Bristol to examine "racial disadvantage". The committee selected Parkway as the venue for their sessions in May 1980. This decision sparked criticism due to the church hall's limited capacity of approximately 120 people, which frustrated residents wishing to observe the inquiry. Local groups, including the Bristol Council for Community Relations, initially threatened to boycott the event, arguing it was an inadequate response to the unrest, though the schedule was subsequently adjusted to allow for more public discussion. The church remained a focal point for dialogue on race and faith throughout the decade. In 1986, it was the site of a conference convened by the Bristol Methodist community relations group to address institutional racism. Later, in November 1988, Bishop Barry Rogerson delivered an address at the church on "Christianity and World Faith" following a contentious inter-faith service at Bristol Cathedral.

=== Memorials ===
The church has hosted notable memorial services for local figures. In November 1987, a service was held for Alfred Fagon, the Jamaican-born poet, playwright, and actor who lived in St Paul's during the 1960s and 1970s. The service was attended by several hundred people and resulted in the establishment of the Friends of Fagon committee. This group successfully campaigned for the installation of a bronze bust of the writer in St Paul's. Another significant service took place in 1993 for Queenie Hill, a Cub Mistress who had served the local scouting movement for 50 years; the church was filled to capacity with uniformed scouts paying their respects.

=== Current activities ===
Parkway marked its 50th anniversary in 2020. It continues to operate within the Bristol and South Gloucestershire Methodist Circuit. The building acts as a venue for various organisations, including the Red Notes Choir, the City of Bristol Brass Band, a Brazilian Cultural Club, and Alcoholics Anonymous.

The church maintains a philanthropic role in the area. It organises an annual Christmas voucher programme which, as of 2026, supported over sixty vulnerable families. This initiative is run in partnership with the Strangers Friend Society, a benevolence charity with historical links to John Wesley.

Past ministers include the Rev. Bernard Hall (1971), Rev. Paul Clifton (1975), Rev. Richard Barrett (who departed in 1992 for a teaching post at Wesley College), Rev. Jim Linthicum (1992), and Rev. Richard Sharples (c. 2023).

== Architecture and fittings ==
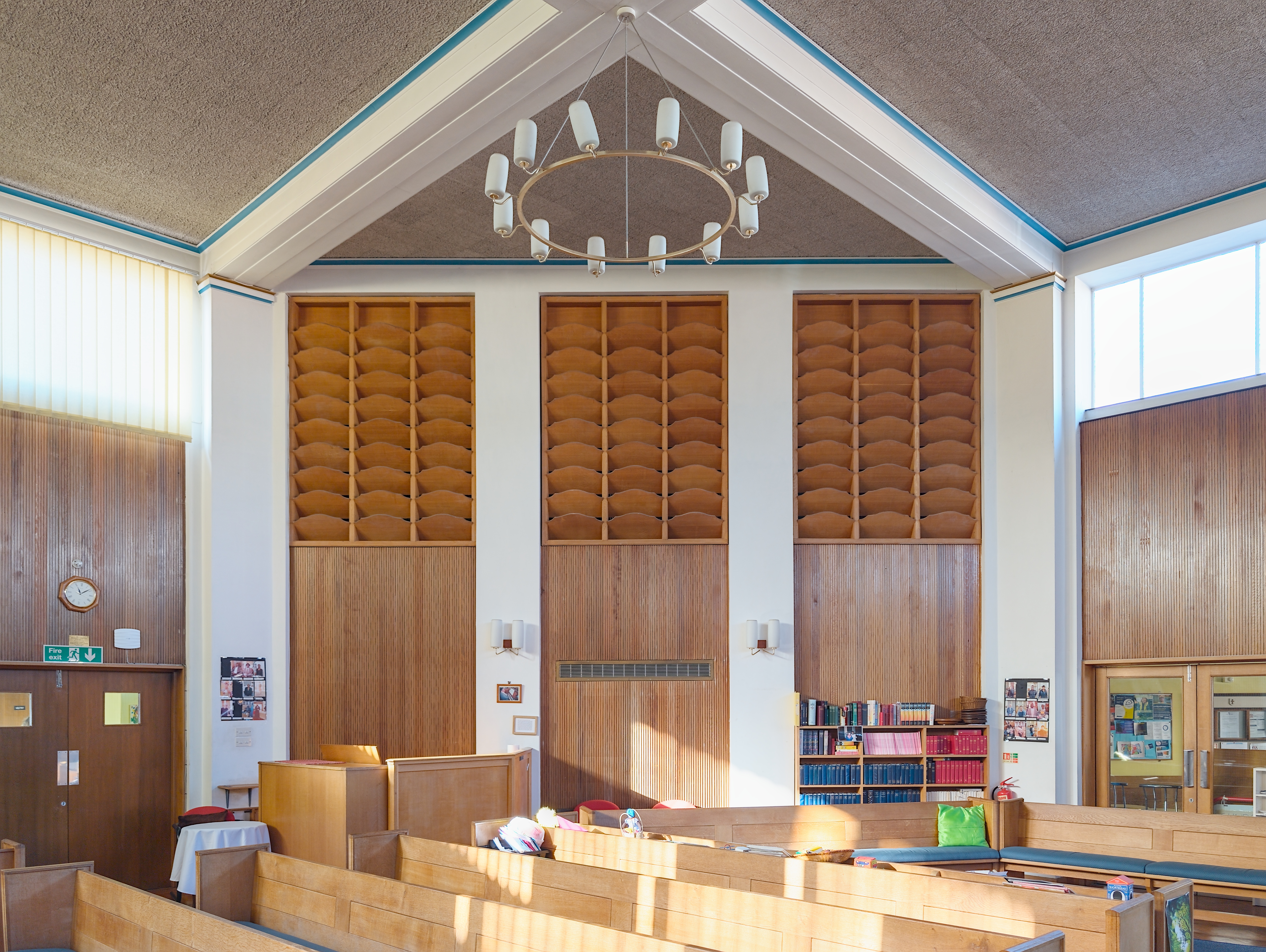
The housing of the John Coulson organ, behind a wood screen, with console presented by Mr and Mrs Percy J. Fussell in dedication of parents

Designed by the architect Eustace Button, Parkway Methodist Church was constructed between 1971 and 1972. Construction work was carried out by the Bristol firm Henry Willcock & Co. Ltd. The structure is notable for its octagonal plan and a steeply pitched roof surmounted by a central spirelet. The layout excludes transepts, featuring instead a short apsidal sanctuary on the eastern side.

The interior contains modern stained glass, including an east window made of cast glass and resin. This abstract work was produced in 1971 by Geoffrey Robinson of the firm Joseph Bell & Son. It is a three-light dalles de verre composition that depicts sun-and-planet imagery, and was created through resin-bonding techniques. The church also contains a pipe organ, positioned at the rear of the building behind a timber screen. The instrument was rebuilt in the 1970s by the Bristol organ builder John Coulson, re-using pipework from Brookland Methodist Church. The Brookland organ was a late-19th-century instrument by the Bath firm of William Sweetland. The site also includes ancillary facilities such as vestries and fellowship rooms. These spaces have supported various community initiatives, including a pre-school playgroup that secured funding from a cable television company in 1996.

Three-light window by Geoffrey Robinson, 1971, located on the southeast side of the church above the sanctuary

In 2023, a large mural of 8 by 4 metres was added to the exterior wall. Commissioned by the minister Rev. Richard Sharples to better connect with the St Werburgh's neighbourhood, the artwork was executed by the street artist Silent Hobo. The design, developed in collaboration with the church's youth group, depicts themes of pollution and racism, centred around the message "Where there is Faith there is Hope".

== See also ==
- Horfield United Reformed Church, another Bristol church designed by Eustace H. Button
- List of churches in Bristol

Other churches that are members of Ashley Churches Together Serving:

- City Road Baptist Church
- Ivy Pentecostal Church
- St Agnes Church
- St Nicholas of Tolentino Church
