= St Nicholas of Tolentino Church, Bristol =

Roman Catholic church in Bristol, England

St Nicholas of Tolentino Church
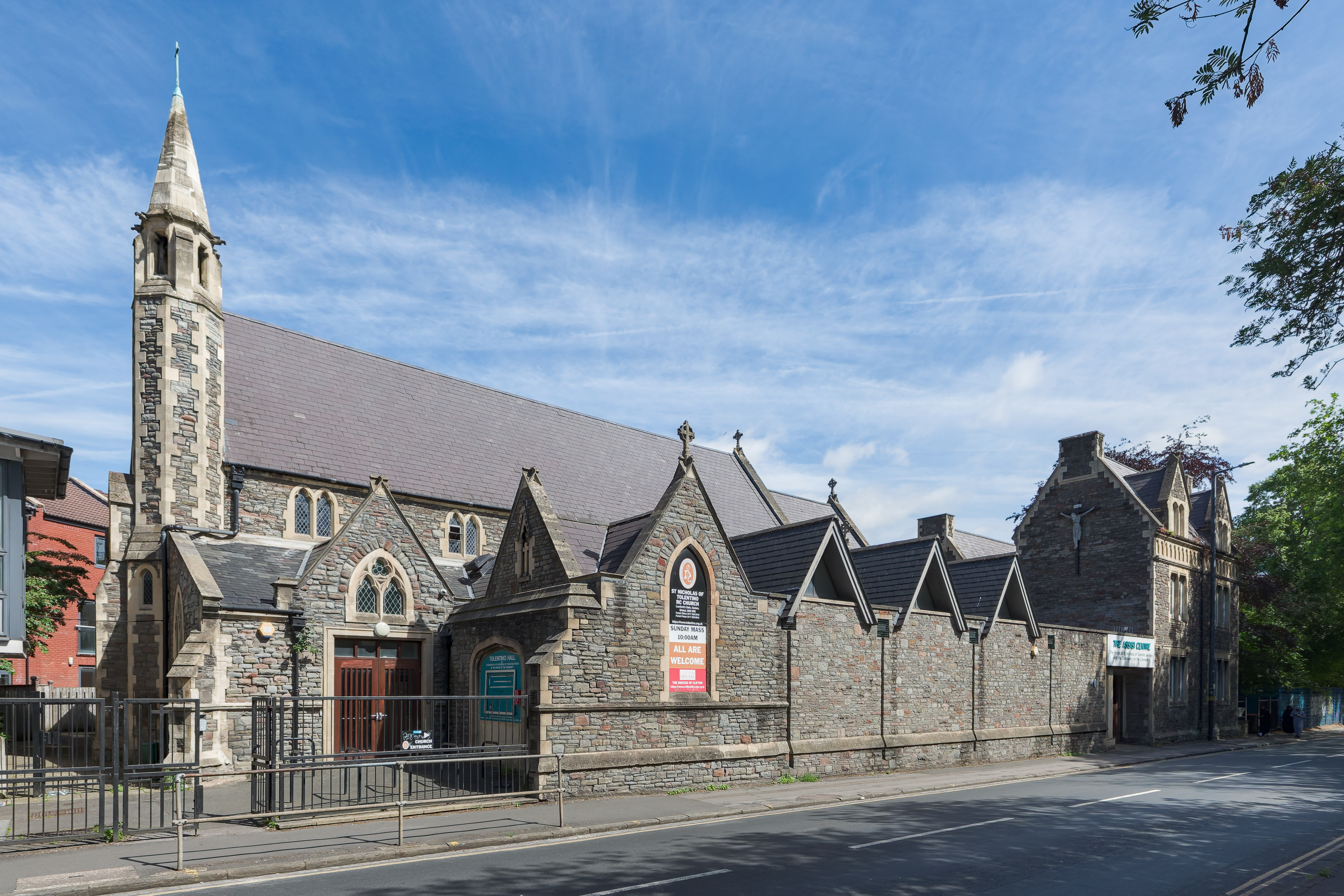
- St Nicholas of Tolentino Church
- 51.4590°N 2.5776°W
- Location: Easton, Bristol, England
- Denomination: Roman Catholic

History
- Status: Active
- Founded: 1848
- Founder: Bishop William Ullathorne
- Dedication: St Nicholas of Tolentino
- Consecrated: 10 September 1895

Architecture
- Architect(s): Charles Hansom (original); O'Leary Goss (2007 remodel)
- Architectural type: Gothic Revival

Administration
- Province: Birmingham
- Diocese: Clifton

Locally Listed Building
- Official name: St Nicholas Church, Lawfords Gate
- Designated: 1 September 2016
- Reference no.: 422

St Nicholas of Tolentino is a Roman Catholic parish church located at Lawford's Gate in Easton (or St Jude's), Bristol, England. Founded in 1848 to serve a growing population of impoverished Irish refugees settling the area, it is the oldest purpose-built Catholic church in the city.

The building, originally designed by the architect Charles Francis Hansom, underwent significant expansion during the 19th century and an internal reordering between 2007 and 2009. In 2018, it became the first church in Bristol to be officially awarded Church of Sanctuary status for its work with asylum seekers and refugees.

== History ==
The mission was established in March 1848 by Bishop William Bernard Ullathorne, who purchased a site opposite Lawford's Gate Prison for £1,000. Early worship took place in a temporary chapel near Stapleton Road before the permanent church was established. The location, then considered part of St Philip's or The Dings, was an area of "extreme poverty" heavily populated by Irish Catholic refugees fleeing the Great Famine; this demographic made up the majority of the church's early congregation. The mission was initially entrusted to the Augustinians, with the Rev. Nicholas O'Donnell serving as the first priest. The church was named after the 13th-century Augustinian friar Nicholas of Tolentino, and the nave was opened on 21 December 1850, having been constructed at a cost of £1,600.

In 1852, the Augustinians resigned the mission, after which it was staffed by diocesan clergy. Father O'Donnell was succeeded by the Rev. W. Cullinan from St Mary on the Quay, and subsequently by the Rev. Jacob Illingworth, who administered the parish until 1856.

The church saw rapid expansion in the mid-19th century to accommodate its growing congregation. By 1861, the parish schools were overcrowded, with an average attendance of 110 girls and 85 boys. The Rev. T. M. Hoskins drove a major enlargement project to provide more space for both worship and education. To manage the lack of space, one of the newly constructed aisles was temporarily screened off during the week to function as a boys' school, allowing the existing schoolrooms to be merged for the use of the girls.

Septimus Canon Coxon had arrived at the mission in August 1872, having previously served at Cannington in Somerset. A further expansion followed in 1873 under Coxon, which added a new chancel and presbytery. By the completion of these works, the church's capacity had increased to accommodate approximately 700 worshippers. In 1876, the Bishop of Clifton, William Clifford, visited the parish to preach on the importance of Catholic education, noting that the school's survival depended on its efficiency.

By the late 19th century, the parish complex had expanded to include dedicated educational facilities. Coxon contributed significantly to the expansion of the school facilities; he donated the financial gift presented to him for his sacerdotal silver jubilee entirely toward the construction of a new classroom. A classroom block designed by T. C. Hodges was constructed between 1879 and 1880, followed by a later block designed by Scoles & Raymond in 1910. These buildings, known collectively as St Nicholas House, served as the parish school until 1985 when the school relocated. The structures were subsequently used as diocesan offices before being demolished in 2008 to make way for a new presbytery and Saints' Court housing development.

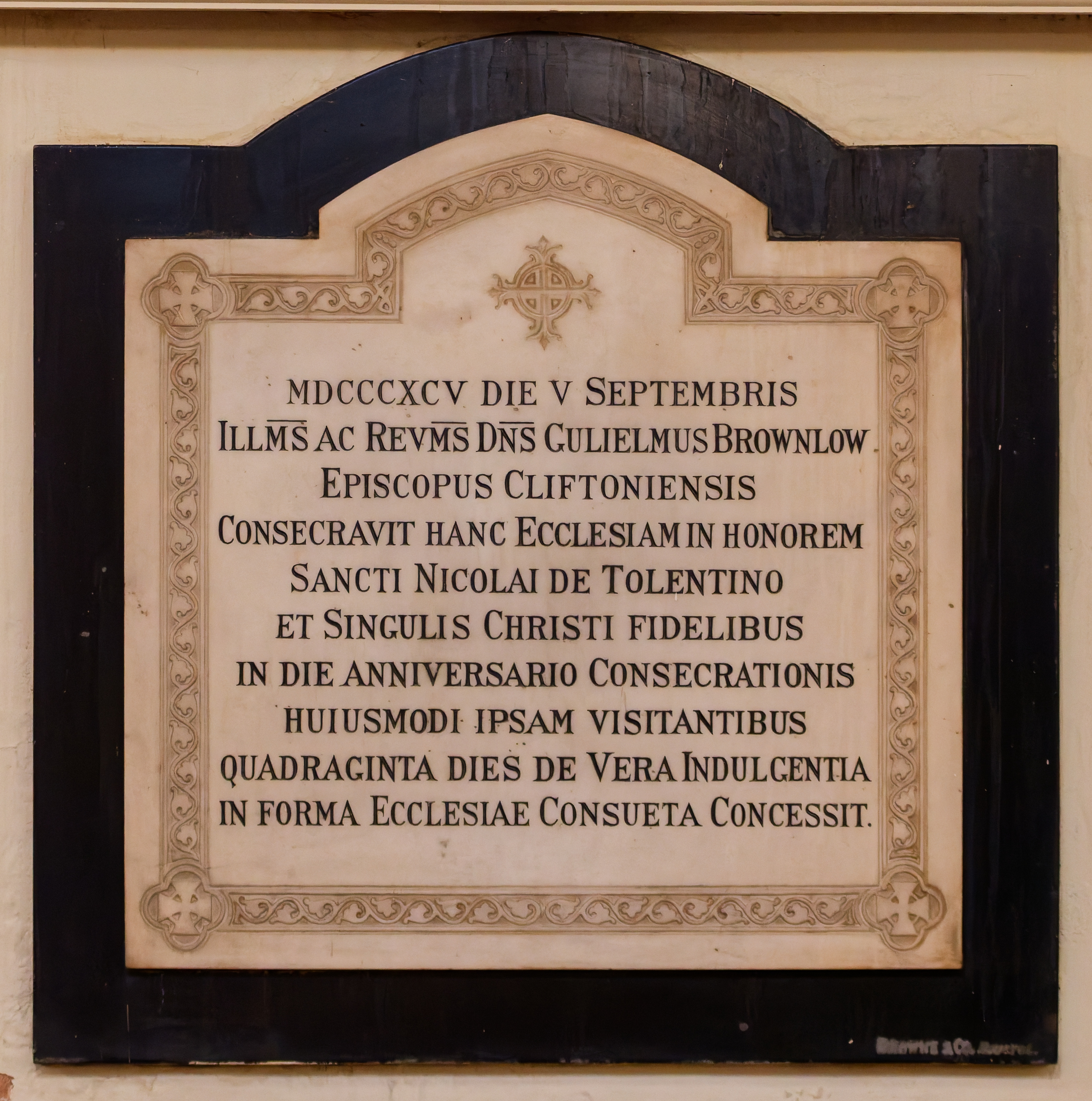
Consecration tablet on the north wall, naming Bishop William Brownlow

Because a Catholic church cannot be consecrated while it carries debt, the consecration of St Nicholas of Tolentino did not take place until 10 September 1895, nearly 50 years after its foundation. The 1895 consecration ceremony was an elaborate event involving the sealing of relics of martyrs within the altar, the strewing of ashes on the church floor in the form of a cross, and the tracing of the Greek and Latin alphabets in the ashes by the bishop using his crozier. The clearance of the building's debt of over £800 was achieved through Coxon's fundraising efforts. Both this and the opening of a Catholic Social Club on 21 April 1896 were overseen by Bishop William Brownlow. During his 34-year tenure as rector, Coxon officiated at 1,654 baptisms and 290 marriages by March 1912. Following his death in December 1915, he bequeathed his vestments and church furniture to the mission, along with a donation to the Society of Saint Vincent de Paul for the aid of the parish poor. From 1915 to 1935, the parish was administered by Canon Peter Murphy, an Irish-born priest who served as the diocesan organiser of the Apostleship of Prayer and had previously been chaplain to the nearby Convent of the Good Shepherd at Arno's Court.

The church faced challenges in the late 20th century, including an incident in August 1978 where vandals smashed seven stained glass windows, causing approximately £400 worth of damage. In the mid-1990s, the parish was one of multiple in which the Bishop of Clifton, Mervyn Alexander, banned the Neocatechumenal Way from holding separate Saturday night meetings.

The church was assessed by English Heritage in 2006 and found not to merit listed status, though it is recorded as an unlisted building of merit within the Old Market Quarter Neighbourhood Development Plan. In 2016, the building was added to the Bristol Local List by Bristol City Council.

== Community and ministry ==
The church has a history of social ministry dating back to its foundation in an area of high poverty. During the early 1990s, the church premises were utilised to support the city's homeless population. Before establishing a permanent base at St James' Priory, the Little Brothers of Nazareth operated a Sunday evening drop-in centre at St Nicholas of Tolentino. Known locally as "monks, punks and drunks", the initiative provided food and shelter on the one night of the week when other local shelters were closed. In 1991, the Community of Little Brothers and Sisters of Nazareth launched a fundraising appeal for a permanent homeless centre, having used the church as a base for weekly drop-in sessions where they provided food and counselling. The group moved out of St Nicholas after they acquired a lease for St James' Priory in 1993.

By the 21st century, the church served a highly multicultural congregation, with over 50 nationalities represented. It established a reputation for social activism, particularly regarding asylum seekers and poverty relief. In 2018, St Nicholas of Tolentino became the first church in Bristol to be officially awarded Church of Sanctuary status by the City of Sanctuary organisation.

The church has provided sanctuary and logistical support to individuals facing deportation. During the high-profile case of Rwandan genocide survivor Josette Ishimwe of 2004–2005, parish priest Fr. Richard McKay refused police entry to detain her, stating he was prepared to go to prison to protect her. She was subsequently granted indefinite leave to remain in 2005. The parish has also utilised direct action to prevent the removal of parishioners. In 2008, the congregation organised a mass communication campaign, sending approximately 100 faxes to the Home Office and airlines to successfully halt the deportation of the Kamtcheu family to Cameroon. The following year, the church intervened in the case of parishioner Dieumerci Kasongo Kongolo, helping to secure a High Court injunction less than an hour before his scheduled removal to the Democratic Republic of the Congo. The church has also served as a venue for cultural events highlighting these issues, such as the 2009 production of the play Asylum Dialogues by the Actors for Human Rights network.

The church's intense inner-city ministry has been cited as a catalyst for religious vocations; Father Isidore Nnamdi Obi, a Nigerian national who arrived in Bristol in 2006, credited his experience of the parish's support for migrants as the inspiration for his decision to enter the priesthood. In December 2009, the church co-hosted a major public inquiry into the destitution of refused asylum seekers, which was attended by the leader of Bristol City Council, Barbara Janke, and the Archdeacon of Bristol.

The parish also operates a dedicated food bank. Following the COVID-19 pandemic, the church reported a "total scandal" of poverty, forcing the parish to use savings to purchase food as donations dwindled. In September 2022, when a fatal fire broke out at the nearby Twinnell House tower block, the church served as a rest centre for approximately 90 evacuated residents.

== Architecture and fittings ==
=== Exterior ===
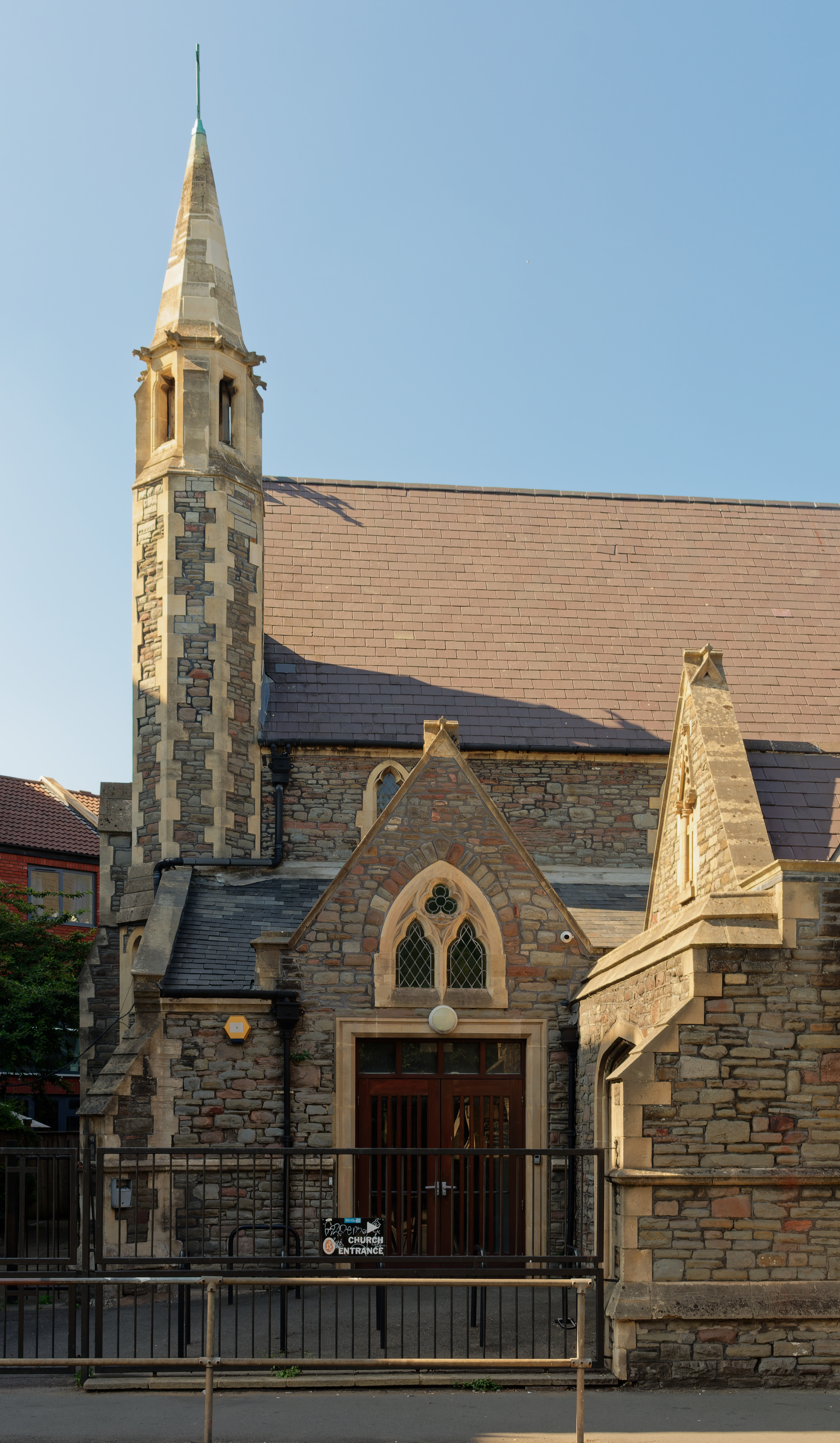
Tolentino Hall, located in the subdivided west-end of the church, now used as a centre for refugees

The church is built in a 13th-century Gothic Revival style that utilises Pennant stone rubble with Bath stone dressings and slate-covered roofs, with a spirelet on the southwest corner. The design and construction evolved in several phases throughout the 19th century, with the original architect Charles Hansom overseeing the major additions.

The nave was the first section to be built, opening in 1850. The interior arches and pillars were initially left in rough block form. These were worked and moulded into their finished state during the 1861 expansion, which added the north and south aisles. This phase included the construction of a porch projecting 6 feet (1.8 m) from the aisle to face the road. The works also involved the removal of the original bell gable, which was replaced by an ornamental octagonal turret situated at the south entrance. The 1861 general contractor was J. P. Stephens, with carpentry by a Mr. Bennett, plastering by John Tucker, and plumbing and glazing by a Mr. Barber.

In 1873, Hansom returned to add the chancel, Lady Chapel, sacristy, and presbytery. The chancel measured 25 by 18 feet (7.6 m × 5.5 m), while the Lady Chapel was approximately 15 by 14 feet (4.6 m × 4.3 m). The Lady Chapel was fitted with a carved triangular window filled with three trefoiled circles. J. P. Stephens again served as contractor for the chancel, while the presbytery, designed specifically to accommodate direct communication with the sacristy, was built by Messrs. Wilkins.

In the 1960s, the church's footprint was altered with the addition of a new porch fronting Lawford's Gate, with significant alteration again during the 2007–2009 redevelopment. This project included the demolition of a single-storey extension to create a new courtyard entrance at the east end and the construction of a new infill extension on the Lawford's Gate elevation. This extension features three gables constructed from Pennant stone with slate roofs, designed as a modern interpretation of the original street-facing gables. The south elevation was modified to include new windows formed at the roof apex, while existing window openings were altered to form new entryways..Further development occurred in 2020 to improve accessibility for the parish centre (formerly the presbytery), which involved the construction of a new ramp within the inner entrance courtyard and the relocation of the entrance to allow for easier access from the neighbouring primary school.

A 16-foot (4.9 m) hand-carved Peace Pole, originally installed at the Pierian Centre in St Pauls in 2006, was relocated to the church entrance on World Peace Day in 2012 following the centre's closure. Its installation was marked by a multi-faith ceremony involving prayers from different traditions and a performance by pupils from the neighbouring St Nicholas of Tolentino Primary School.

=== Interior ===
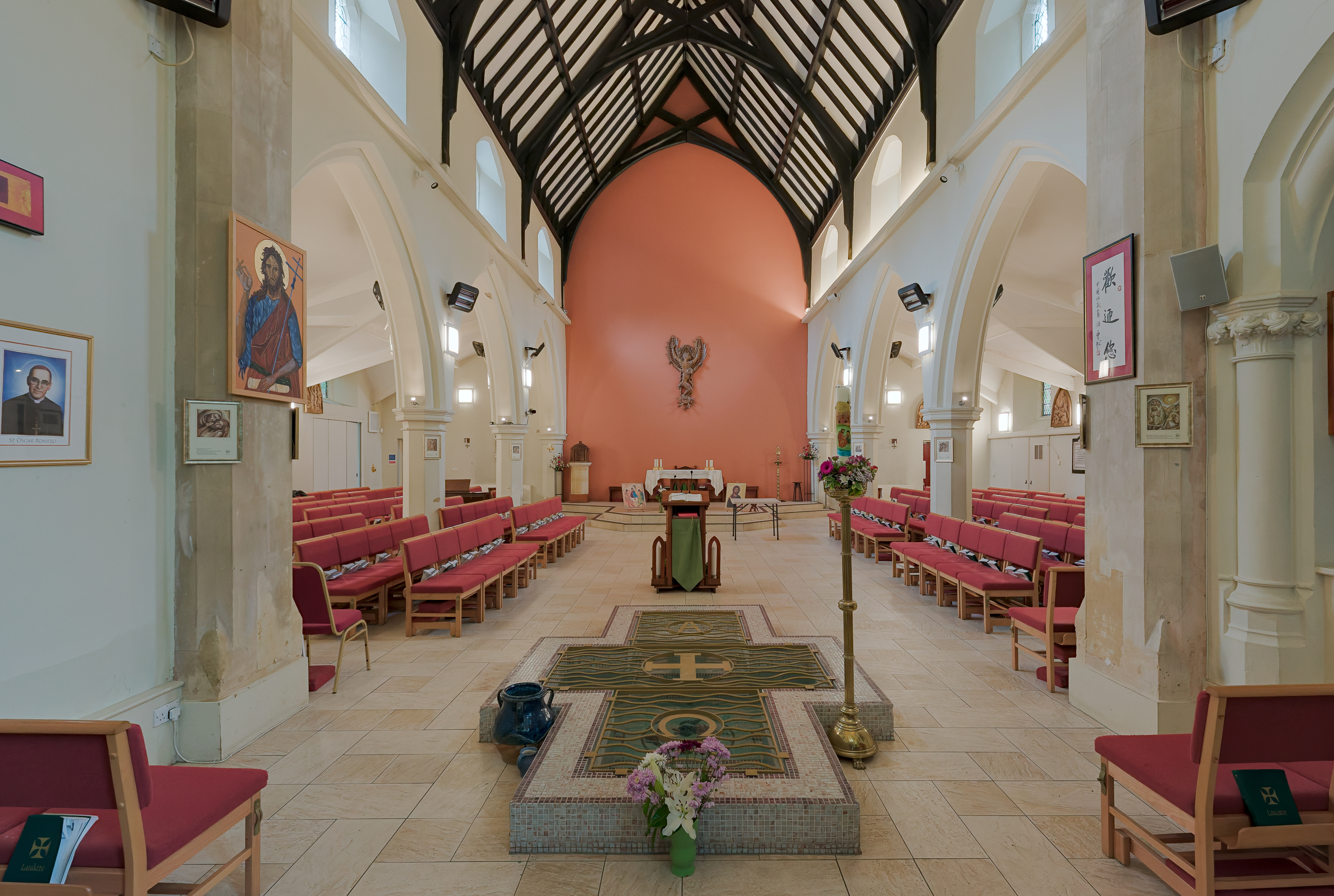
Nave of the church, looking toward the new sanctuary in the west end of the church

The interior features a tall open timber roof with scissor braces. An early addition to the church was a bell manufactured by John Murphy of Dublin, installed in 1850. It was paid for by the Portuguese Consul General, Chevalier Antonio Mascarenhas, who wished to encourage Irish manufacture as part of the new construction.

During the 1861 expansion, the nave was furnished with a stone baptismal font carved with emblems of the Four Evangelists and the Sign of the Dove. The original Lady Altar was erected by parishioner Joseph Hennessy. During the 1873 works, a three-arched stone sedilia featuring carved brackets was installed on the south side of the chancel, along with a piscina recessed into the east wall. An arcade of three moulded stone arches on stone pillars was built to separate the Lady Chapel from the chancel.

The church's main stained glass window on the east side was funded by members of the congregation and installed prior to the 1895 consecration; it survived the 1978 vandalism which damaged seven other windows. To mark the church's centenary in 1995, three ceramic wall panels depicting Saint John the Baptist and Saint Nicholas were commissioned from artist Seamus Malone.

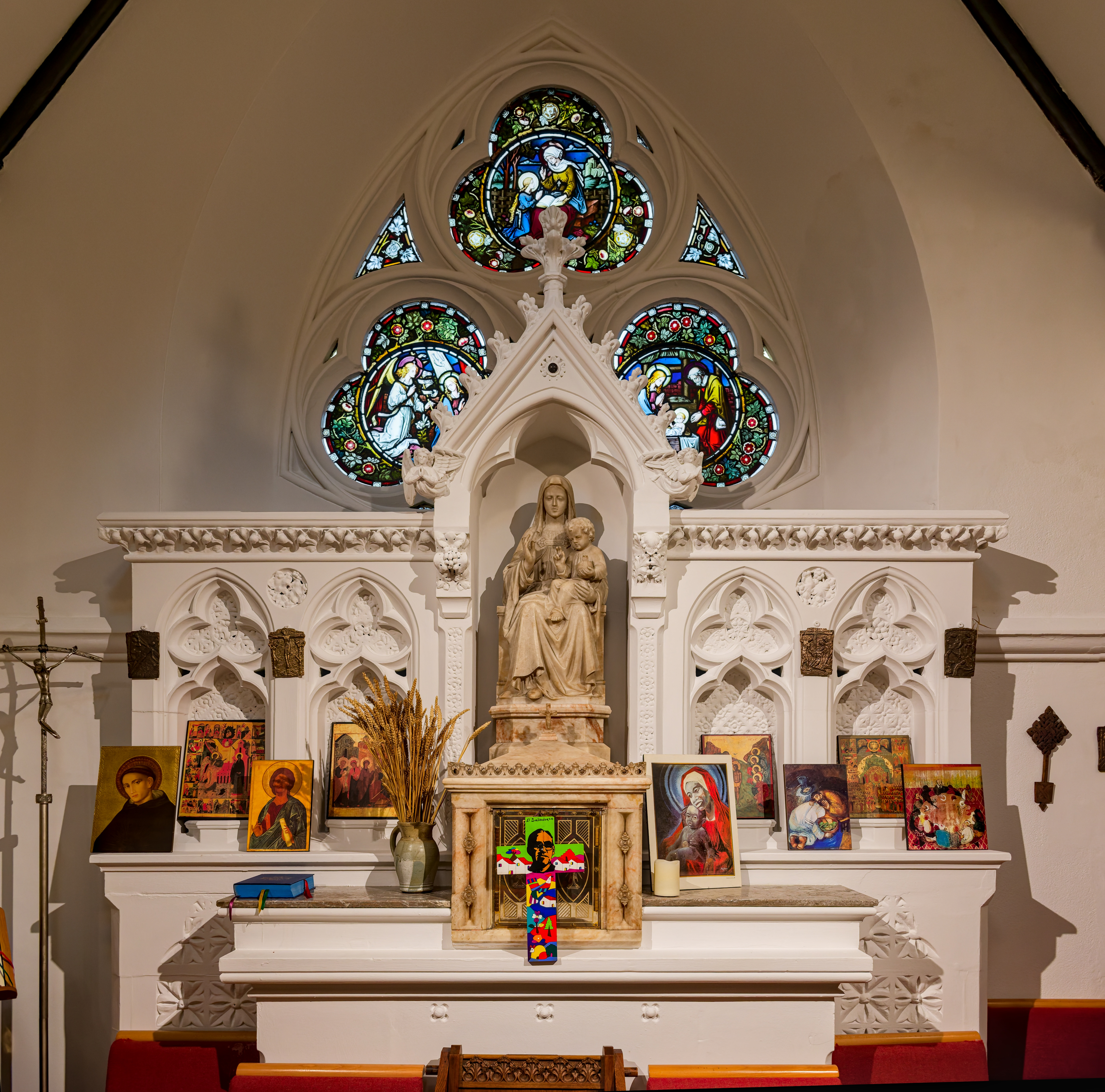
Lady Altar, 1861

East window, Franz Mayer of Munich, c. 1848

West window depicting Saint Thomas and Saint Martin

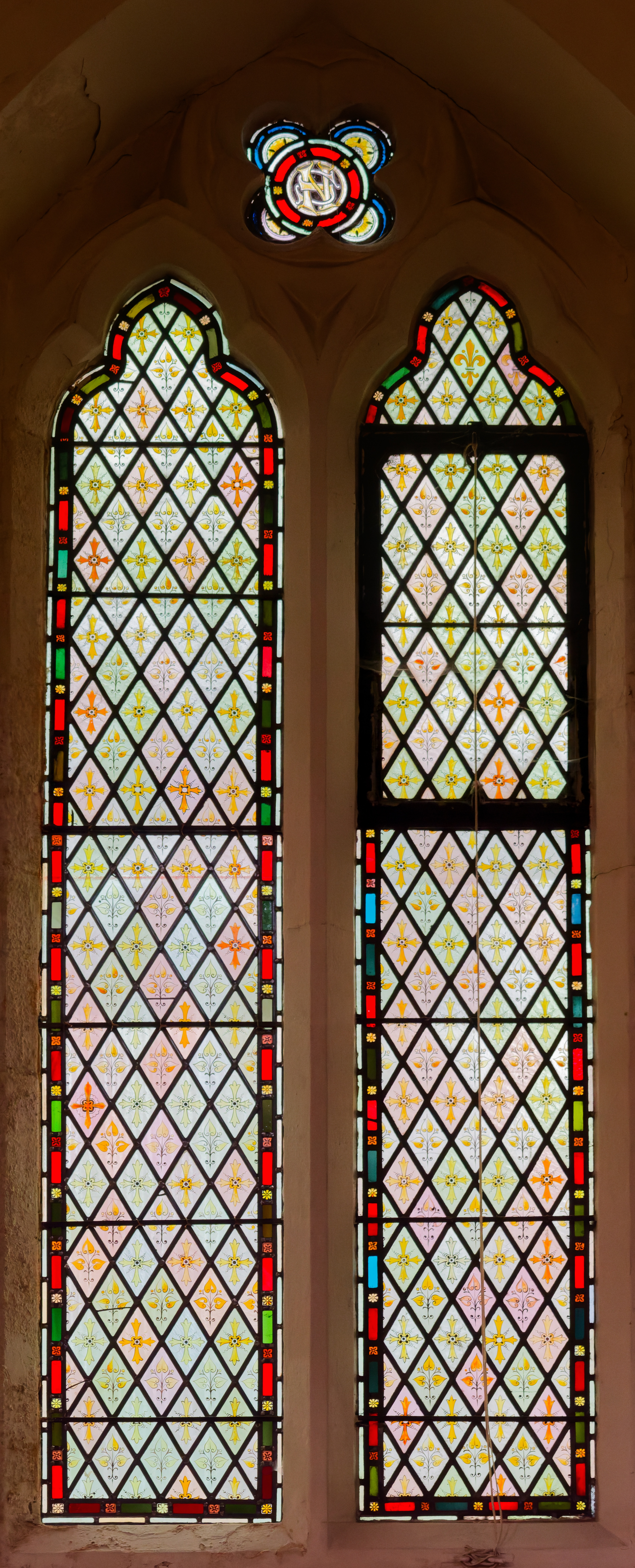
A north window in the church. This example was damaged by vandalism; minor differences can be noticed in the left panes that were replaced

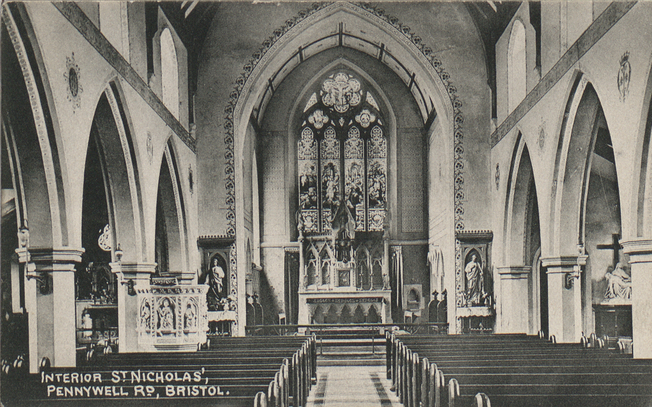
A postcard from 1910 showing the original sanctuary on the northeast end of the church, now the entrance following the 21st-century remodelling

Between 2007 and 2009, the church underwent a major £1.5 million remodelling and subdivision of the building by O'Leary Goss Architects. The project involved the installation of a new main entrance that was created at the east end (the former sanctuary), while the west end of the nave was screened off to create a two-storey church hall with a mezzanine in the former organ space, in which was once an organ made by George Osmond of Taunton and refurbished in 1876 by W. G. Vowles. Following this remodelling, a full-immersion cruciform baptismal pool tiled in mosaic was installed in the nave. The modern nave contains specially commissioned wooden carvings from Malawi, created by the Missionaries of Africa. These include a large statue of Christ with children carved from a single tree-trunk, Stations of the Cross, and a sacrament house designed to resemble an African meeting hut. A series of three meeting rooms were constructed along the south aisle which serve as overflow spaces for high-attendance services. A dedicated day chapel was established distinct from the main worship area, accessible via a central lobby that also connects to a kitchenette and sanitary facilities. The renovation, which was shortlisted for the RIBA South West Town & Country Design awards in 2009, was intended to increase the amount of natural light within the building. The reordering also resulted in a new seating configuration, arranging the congregation to face one another rather than the altar exclusively.

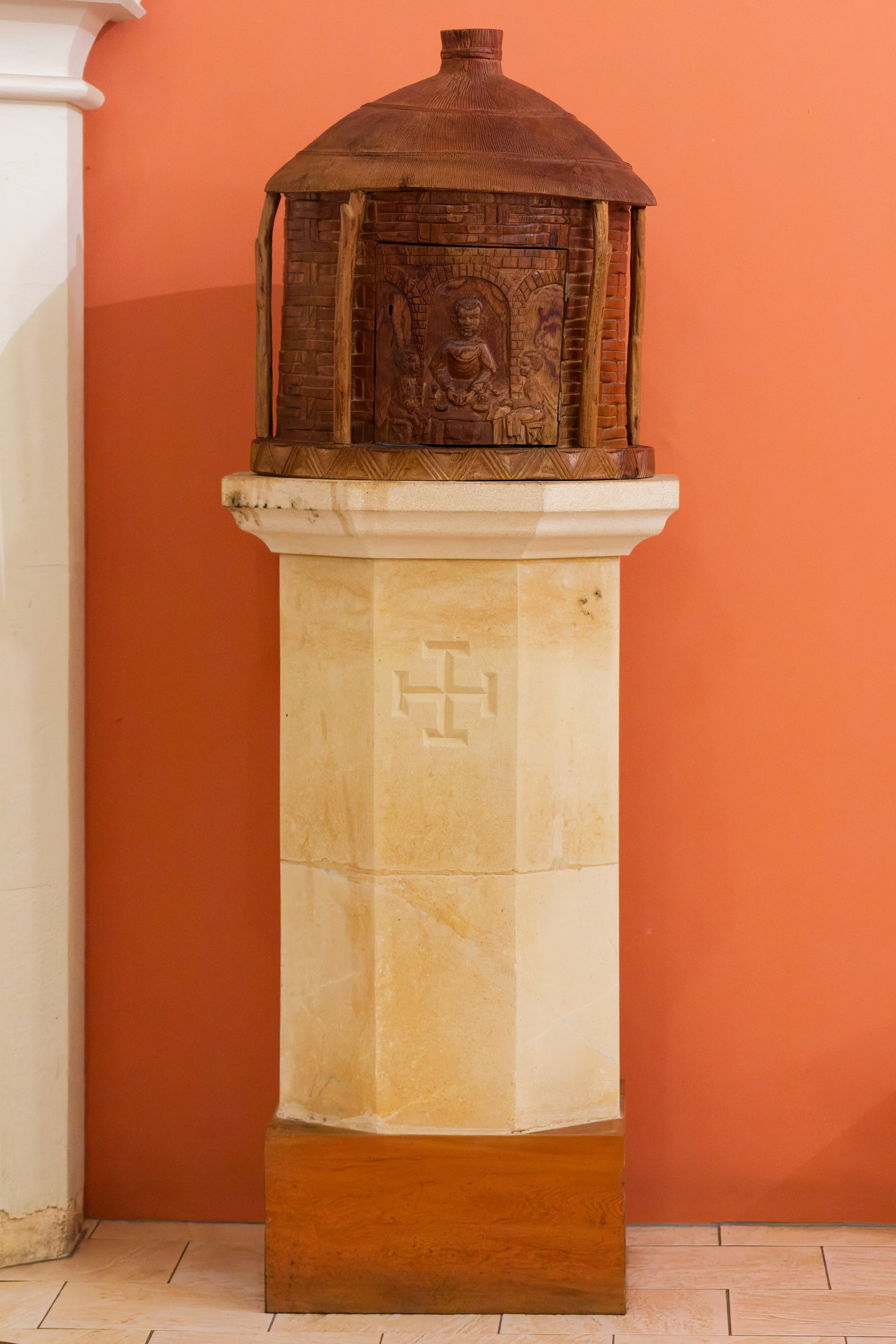
Sacrament house

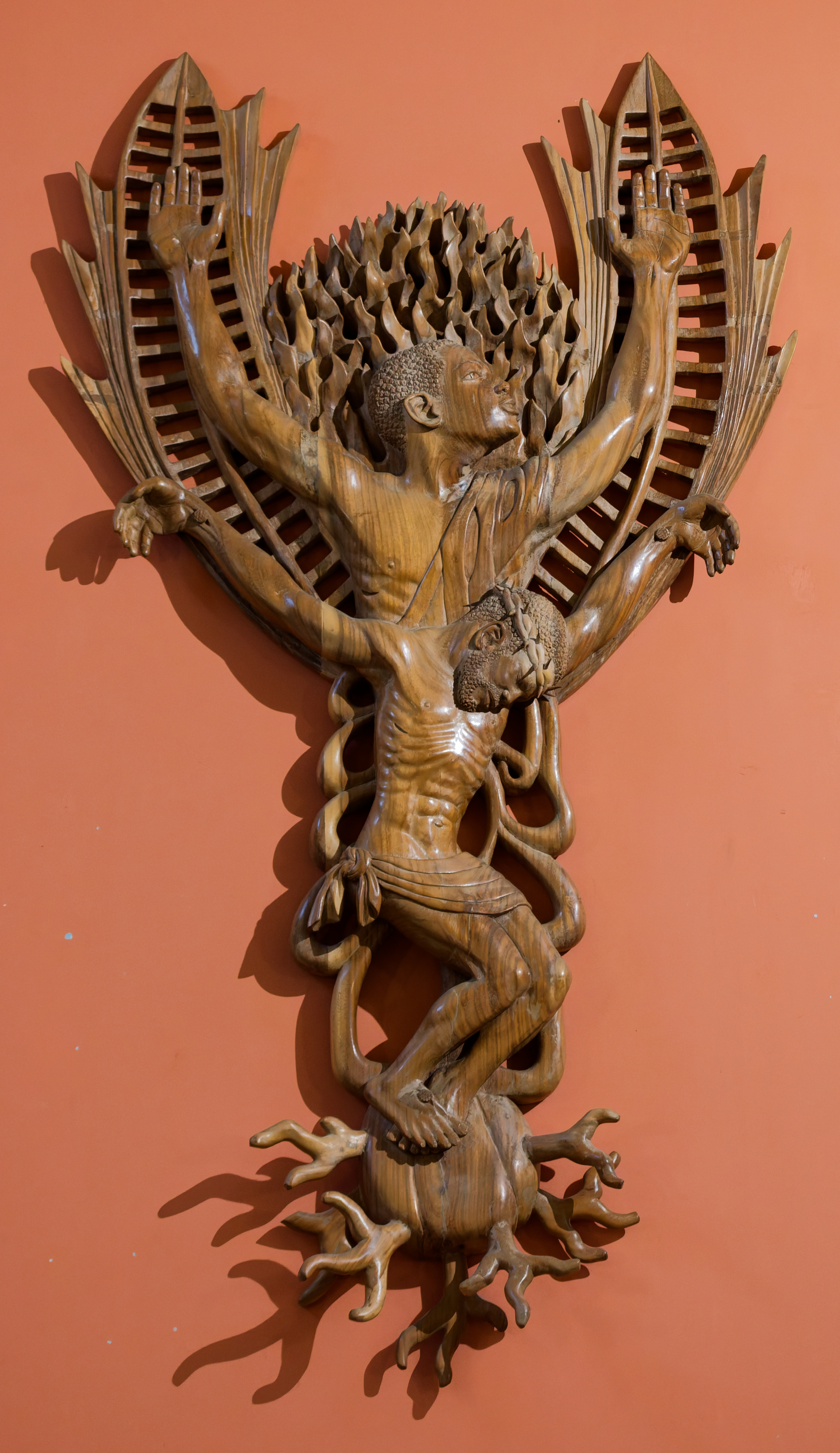
Crucifix

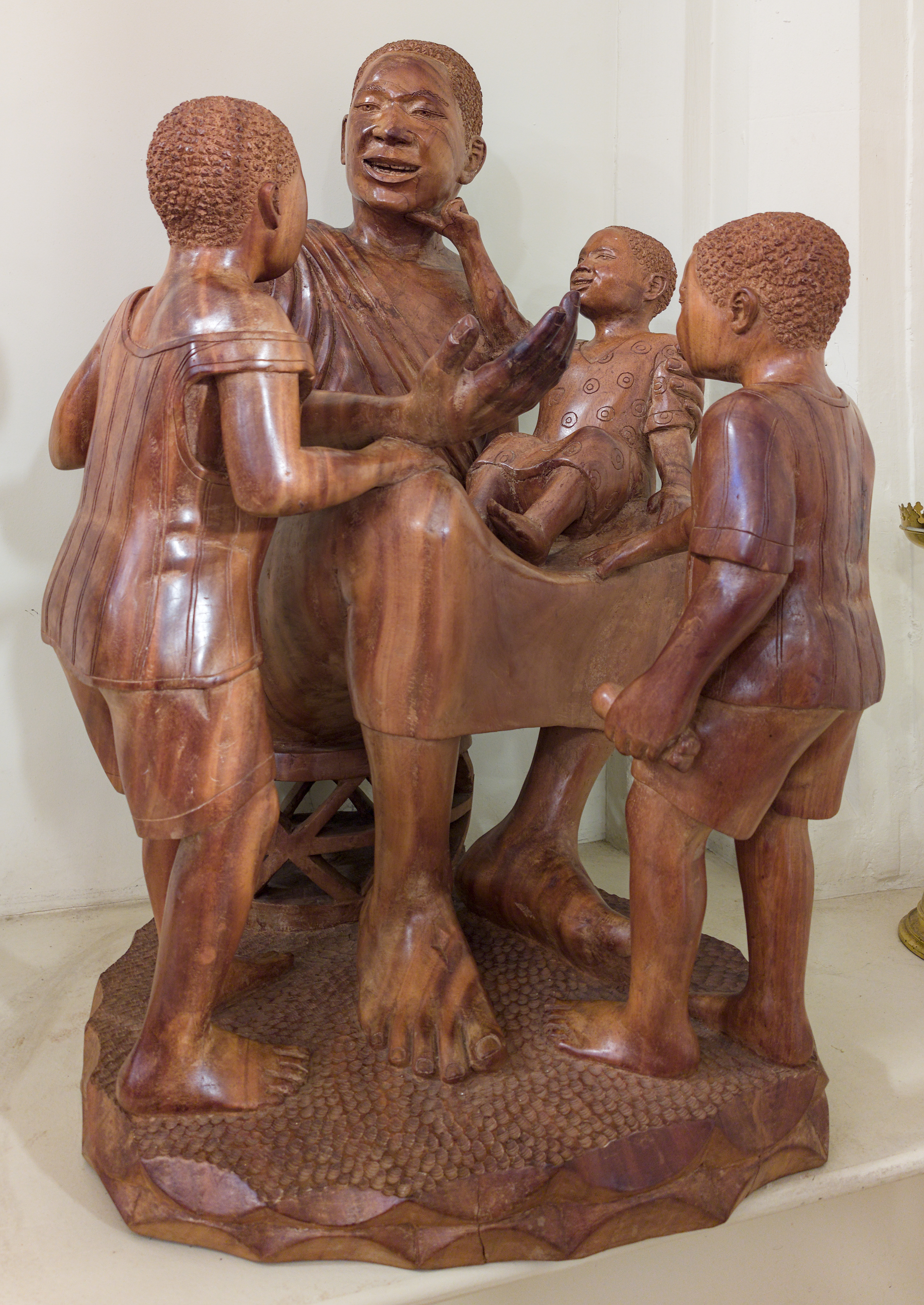
Statue of Christ with children

=== Associated buildings ===
During the development of the adjacent land for the new presbytery and housing (2008–2010), watching briefs of the Bristol and Gloucestershire Archaeological Society recorded the remains of the former school buildings which were demolished to fund the remodelling. These included a classroom block designed by T. C. Hodges (1879–1880) and a later block by Scoles & Raymond (1910).

== See also ==
- List of churches in Bristol
- St Mary on the Quay, the oldest Roman Catholic church in the city, though originally built as a chapel for the Irvingites

Other churches that are members of Ashley Churches Together Serving:

- City Road Baptist Church
- Ivy Pentecostal Church
- Parkway Methodist Church
- St Agnes Church
