= City Road Baptist Church =

Church in Bristol, England

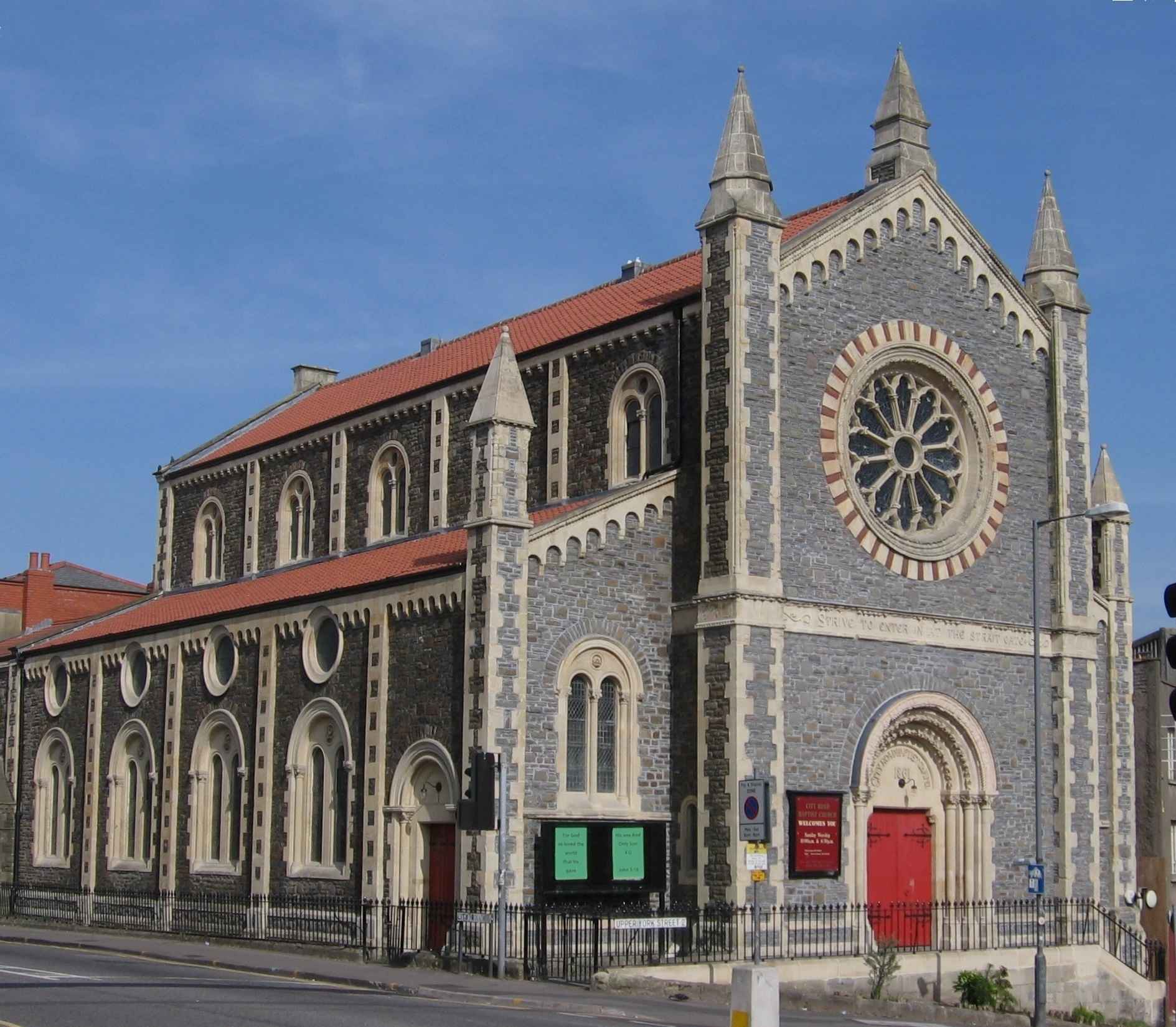

- Location within Bristol

General information
- Architectural style: Italianate
- Location: Bristol, England
- Coordinates: 51.461955°N 2.589834°W
- Completed: 1861

Design and construction
- Architects: James Medland and Alfred William Maberly

The City Road Baptist Church is a Baptist church on Upper York Street, Stokes Croft in Bristol, England.

It was built in 1861 by the Gloucester architects James Medland and Alfred William Maberly. Charles Spurgeon preached at the opening on 11 September.

It has been designated by English Heritage as a Grade II listed building. The church is built of snecked masonry with limestone dressings in the Italianate style.

== See also ==
- Churches in Bristol
- Grade II listed buildings in Bristol

Other churches that are members of Ashley Churches Together Serving:

- Ivy Pentecostal Church
- Parkway Methodist Church
- St Agnes Church
- St Nicholas of Tolentino Church
