= Murder of Becky Watts =

2015 murder of British student

Becky Watts
- Born: Rebecca Marie Watts; 3 June 1998; Bristol, England
- Died: 19 February 2015 (aged 16); Bristol, England
- Cause of death: Suffocation
- Occupation: Student

Rebecca Marie Watts (3 June 1998 – 19 February 2015) was a British student from Bristol who was murdered in 2015 at the age of 16. In November 2015, her step-brother, Nathan Matthews, 28, was found guilty of her murder and was sentenced to life in prison with eligibility for parole after 33 years. His girlfriend, Shauna Hoare, was found guilty of manslaughter and sentenced to 17 years in prison, although Hoare had insisted to police that she had nothing to do with the killing, or dismembering Watts' body and hiding the parts. Both Matthews and Hoare were also convicted of conspiracy to kidnap, preventing the lawful burial of a body, perverting the course of justice and possession of two stun guns.

== Disappearance ==
Becky Watts was last seen at home at 18 Crown Hill in St George, Bristol, on the morning of 19 February 2015 by her step-mother Anjie Galsworthy. Suffering with multiple sclerosis, Galsworthy left the house at around 11:15 for a hospital appointment. Watts was reported missing at around 16:00 the following day. Investigators found that her phone, laptop and tablet computer were missing from the house, but she had not taken any money or spare clothes with her and did not tell anyone that she was going away.

== Investigation ==
On 22 February, Avon and Somerset Police made their first appeal for information about her disappearance, and the following day, her father and grandmother appeared at a press conference appealing for her return. An online campaign using the hashtag "#FindBecky" was launched on social media, reaching more than two million people worldwide.

Police searches focused on a number of properties in Barton Hill, Southmead, St George's Park and Troopers Hill nature reserve. In addition, searches were made in nearby open spaces and park areas, as well as house to house inquiries. Searches were also organised by public volunteers in areas including in Wharf Road in Fishponds, Trym Valley and Badock's Wood. Police made a public appeal for information regarding the movements of a black Vauxhall Zafira between 19 and 23 February.

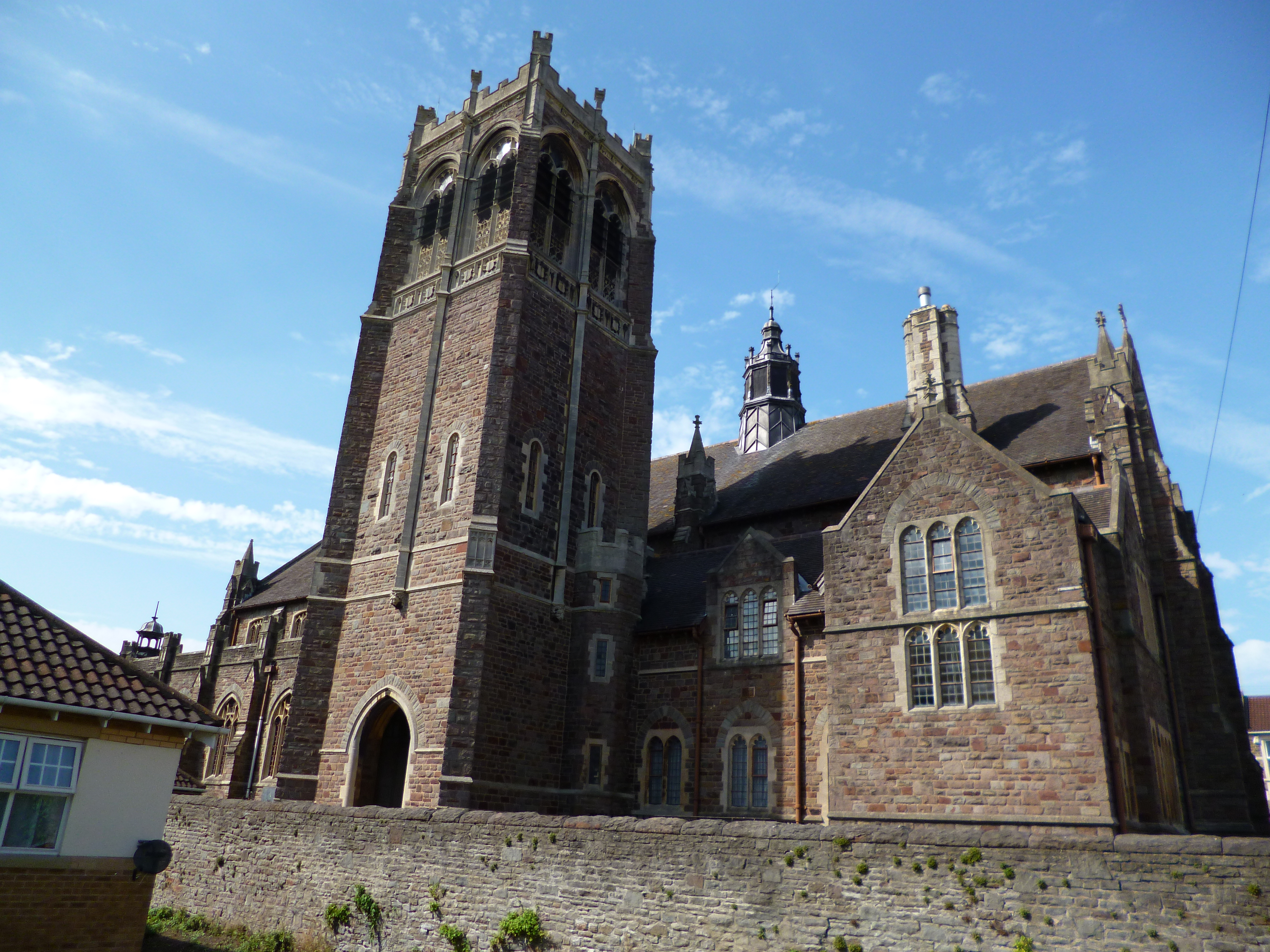
Watts's funeral was held at St Ambrose Church in Whitehall, Bristol.

Initial inquiries focused on the belief that Watts had disappeared after leaving the family home, based on statements given by her step-brother Nathan Matthews and his girlfriend Shauna Hoare, who were at the house at the time. They said they had not seen Watts but "heard the door slam" and assumed she had left. On 28 February, Matthews and Hoare were arrested in connection with Watts's disappearance. On 2 March, they were re-arrested on suspicion of murder. The following day, Watts's dismembered body was found at a property in Barton Court, Barton Hill. On 4 March, Matthews was charged with murder. On 6 March, four other people who had been arrested were charged with assisting an offender, having been accused of helping to hide or dispose of Watts's body. A 23-year-old man who had also been arrested was released without charge.

On 22 June, Hoare, who was originally charged with perverting the course of justice, was charged with murder. Matthews and Hoare were also charged with conspiracy to kidnap, preventing the lawful burial of a body and possession of an illegal weapon. The couple were also charged with four unrelated counts of making indecent images of children. Matthews was also charged on unrelated counts of sexual assault and voyeurism.

Watts' funeral took place at St Ambrose Church in Whitehall, Bristol, on 17 April 2015 and was described by her family as "an occasion to celebrate Becky's life". The service was followed by a private interment for her family and friends at Avon View Cemetery.

== Trial ==
The murder trial began on 6 October 2015 at Bristol Crown Court. It was the prosecution's case that Watts was suffocated and, after her death, stabbed 15 times in her bedroom during a "sexually-motivated" kidnap plot carried out by Matthews and Hoare. According to the prosecution, after the killing, Matthews and Hoare put Watts's body into the boot of their car and stayed at the house for several more hours, during which time other family members arrived home. Later that day, they drove back to their own house, where over the next few days they dismembered her body using a knife and a circular saw and put the remains into bags and boxes, which were then hidden in a friend's shed. Matthews admitted killing Watts, but denied committing murder. He instead admitted manslaughter, telling the court that he had tried to kidnap his step-sister as a way of scaring her into changing what he perceived as her bad behaviour, but the plan went wrong and he accidentally killed her. Matthews insisted the killing took place while Hoare was in the garden, and that she was not involved. Hoare, who also denied murder, said she had no knowledge of the murder and had played no part in it, describing text messages she had exchanged with Matthews about kidnapping schoolgirls in the months before as "unfortunate" and "sarcastic". The prosecution claimed that the text messages between the two, as well as other content found at their home, suggested "a shared unnatural interest in attractive teenage females".

The prosecution also relied on CCTV evidence of the movements of Matthews and Hoare on the day Watts was last seen alive, and in the days which followed. On 19 February 2015, before going to Crown Hill, they were seen in a Tesco supermarket buying batteries, which were allegedly needed for stun guns which they intended to use in the kidnap. Footage from the day after Watts was killed showed Matthews buying the circular saw that was used to dismember her body, and between 20 and 22 February, he and Hoare were captured shopping for cleaning products which it was said they required to clean the bathroom where the dismemberment took place. DNA linked both Matthews and Hoare to items that were found in the shed alongside the remains, and an expert was called to give evidence who said it would be "easier" to carry out the dismemberment if more than one person was involved.

On 11 November 2015, after 3 hours and 27 minutes of deliberation, the jury found Matthews guilty of murder and Hoare guilty of manslaughter. Both were also convicted of conspiracy to kidnap, perverting the course of justice, preventing the lawful burial of a body and possession of two stun guns. Two men, James Ireland and Donovan Demetrius, were cleared of assisting an offender, which related to the moving and storing of packages containing Watts's remains. Demetrius's brother Karl and his girlfriend Jaydene Parsons, who owned the shed where the remains were stored, had admitted the same charge at an earlier pre-trial hearing, though both insisted they did not know the true contents of the packages. On 5 February 2016, Karl was sentenced to 2 years' imprisonment and Parsons was sentenced to 16 months' imprisonment.

On 13 November 2015, Justice Dingemans sentenced Matthews to life imprisonment with a minimum term of 33 years and Hoare to 17 years in prison. In his sentencing remarks, the judge agreed with the prosecution's belief that the planned kidnap was for a "sexual purpose", telling Matthews he had "a fixation with having sex with petite teenage girls" and that he believed Hoare had been "persuaded to participate in this fixation." He added: "Finally I should like to pay public tribute to the family of Becky for the dignified way in which they have conducted themselves throughout these proceedings" and then continued: "Hearing the evidence during the trial has been difficult for anyone but it is plain that it has been an immense burden for the family."

== Aftermath ==
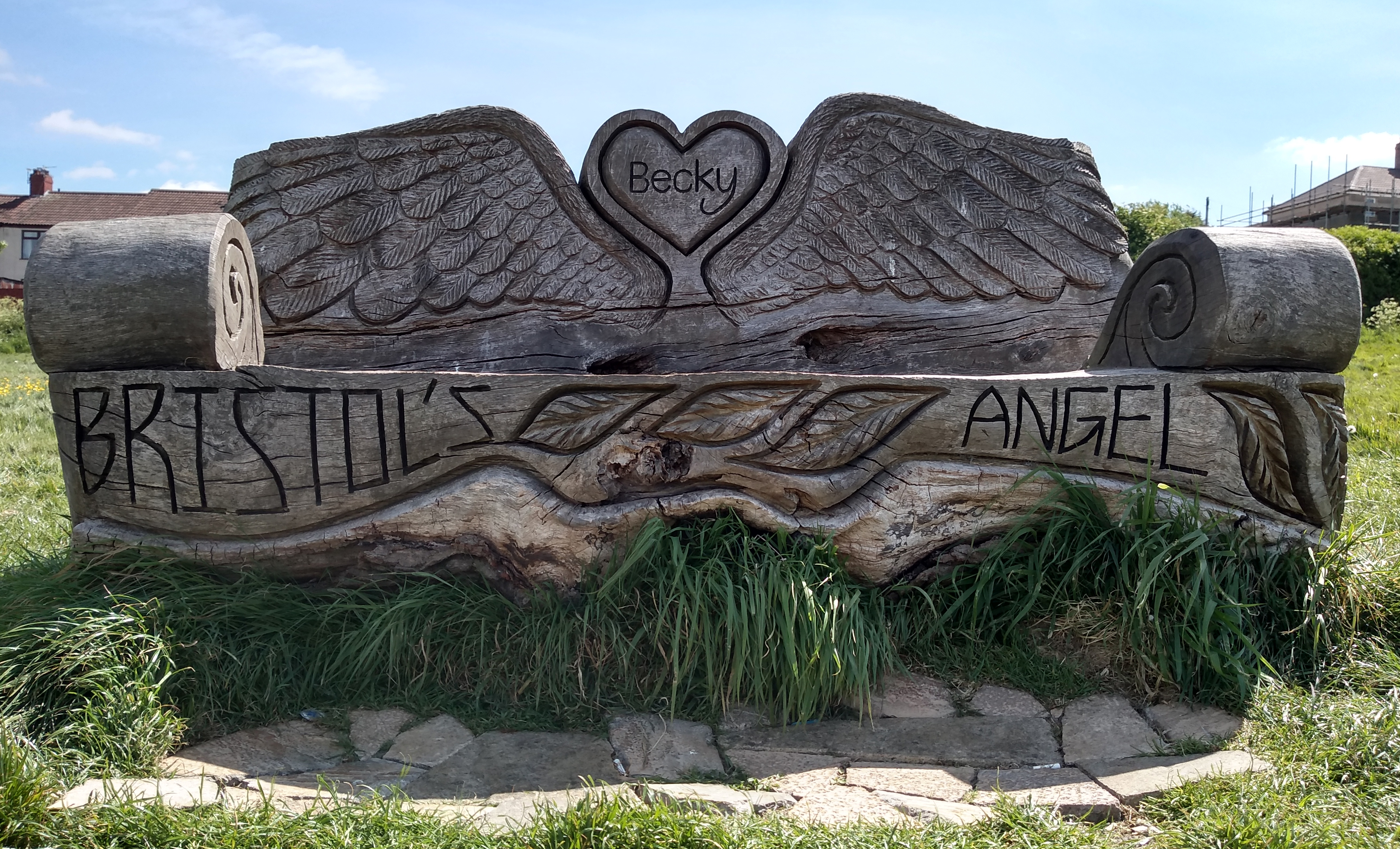
A memorial bench for Watts is located in Goat's Field, Bristol.

In February 2016, a wooden bench was unveiled in Watts's memory, located in Goat's Field, close to her home. The bench, carved by Andy O'Neill, was funded by the Neighbourhood Watch Partnership. A painted mural was also erected in memory of Watts in a park close to where she lived.

In March 2016, Watts's father, Darren Galsworthy, released a memoir which described his daughter's life, her murder and the subsequent criminal trial of those responsible. Titled Becky: The Heartbreaking Story of Becky Watts, the book was published by HarperCollins. It was later re-titled to The Evil Within when released in paperback.

Matthews and Hoare lodged appeals against their convictions and sentences, but on 23 June 2016, the Court of Appeal rejected their applications, saying that there was "no reasonable argument that the convictions are unsafe or that the sentences were wrong in principle or manifestly excessive".

Hoare was released on 1 September 2023, after serving half her sentence.

== See also ==
- Lists of solved missing person cases
