= Crew's Hole, Bristol =

Area of Bristol, England

Coordinates: 51.4592°N 2.5411°W

Crew's Hole
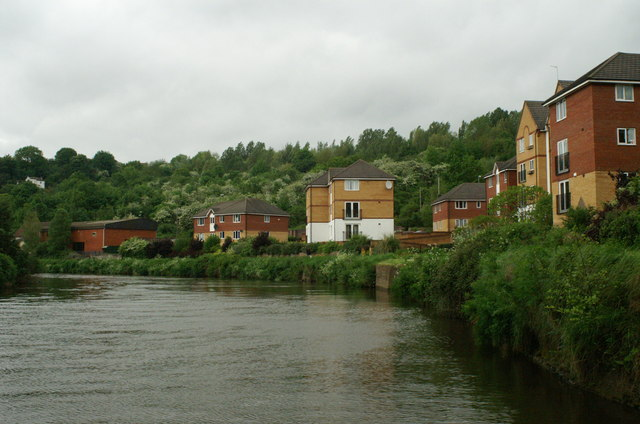
- Quayside Village now occupies the site of the former tar works at Crew's Hole.

- Location within Bristol
- OS grid reference: ST625735
- Unitary authority: Bristol
- Region: South West
- Country: England
- Sovereign state: United Kingdom
- Post town: BRISTOL
- Postcode district: BS5
- Dialling code: 0117
- Police: Avon and Somerset
- Fire: Avon
- Ambulance: South Western
- UK Parliament: Bristol East

Crew's Hole is an area in east Bristol near St George. It is next to the River Avon, two miles upstream from Bristol Bridge.

From the early 18th century it began to be used extensively as an industrial area. The Bristol Brass Company began copper smelting in 1810 at Crew's Hole, and later expanded with a chimney further uphill which gave a better draught condition for the furnaces. Anthony Ammatt established a pottery at Crew's Hole in 1812, using clay transported from the Isle of Wight and Poole. Several bargeworks were built here during the 19th century.

== Tar works ==
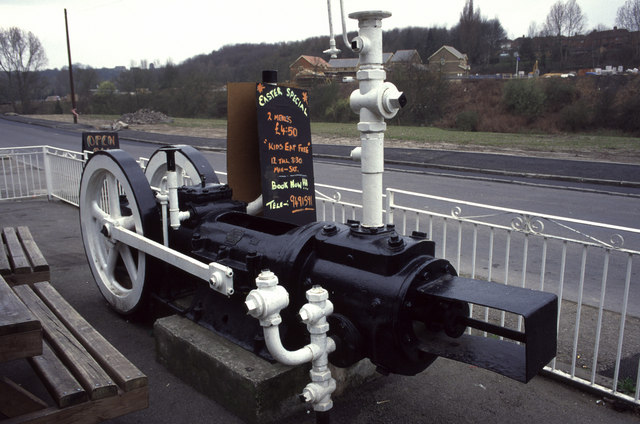
Steam engine from the tar works

A tar works site was established by Isambard Kingdom Brunel in 1843 at the bottom of Troopers Hill, known for its distinctive chimney. It provided creosote to be used as a preservative for railway sleepers and by 1863 had passed into the ownership of Brunel's manager, William Butler. At the turn of the 20th century, the works were used to manufacturer tarmac for roads, which became its main use. British Steel Corporation (BSC) took over running of the tar works in 1970. Under their ownership, it expanded to be one of the most modern in Europe, allowing a continuous 24/7 production of creosote, road tar and smokeless fuel, among other products. It continued to operate until 1981, by which time it had stopped producing road tar and become primarily a distillation unit. After closure, the works lay derelict for some years, until the area was redeveloped as Quayside Village in 1989.

Because Crew's Hole is adjacent to the River Avon, the area has been prone to flooding. Significant floods were recorded in 1894, 1960 and 1968.

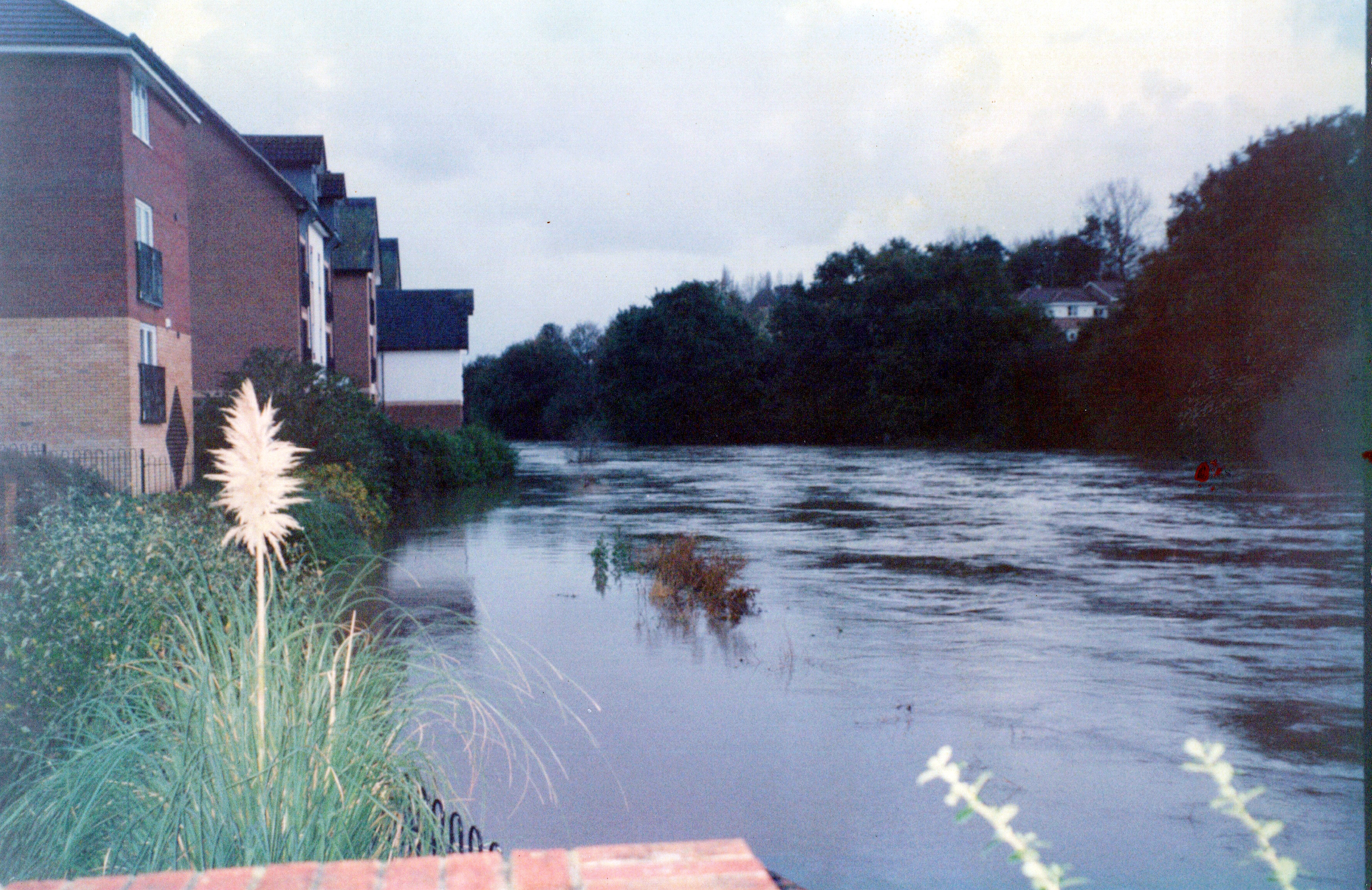
