= St Ambrose's Church, Bristol =

Anglican church in Bristol, England

St Ambrose's Church
- Church of St Ambrose with St Leonard
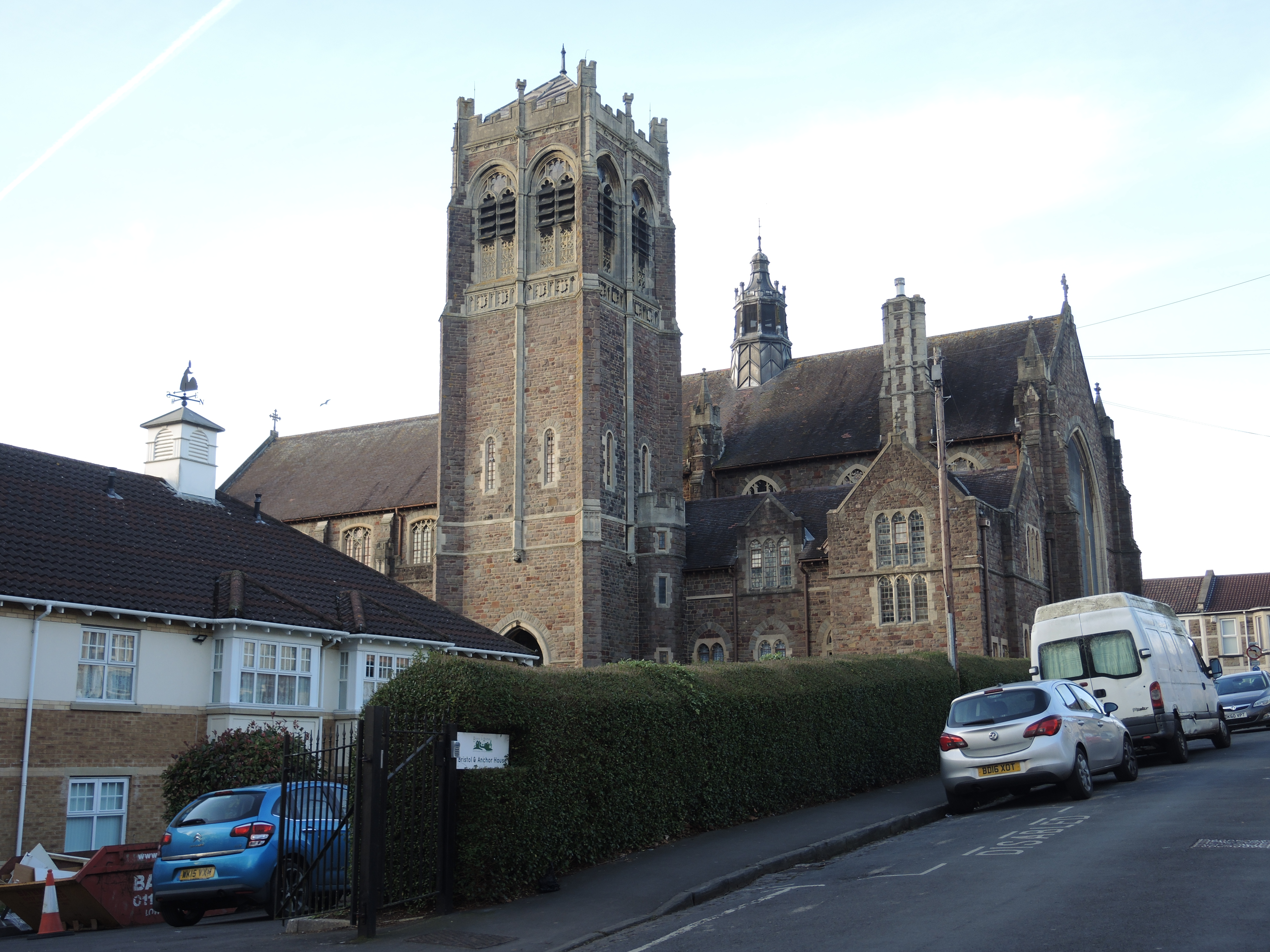
- St Ambrose's Church
- 51.46329°N 2.55029°W
- Location: Whitehall, England
- Denomination: Church of England
- Website: www.stambrosebristol.org.uk

History
- Status: Parish church
- Founded: 1904 (mission district)
- Dedication: Ambrose of Milan; Leonard of Noblac (since 2012)
- Consecrated: 13 November 1913

Architecture
- Architect(s): W. V. Gough and A. R. Gough
- Style: Gothic Revival (Perpendicular), with Arts and Crafts elements
- Years built: 1912-1913
- Construction cost: £10,250 (church, 1912-13)

Specifications
- Capacity: 716

Administration
- Province: Province of Canterbury
- Diocese: Diocese of Bristol
- Parish: St Ambrose and St Leonard

Listed Building – Grade II
- Official name: Church of St Ambrose
- Designated: 4 March 1977
- Reference no.: 1209005

St Ambrose's Church is a Church of England parish church in Whitehall, Bristol, overlooking St George Park. Built in 1912–13 to designs by the Bristol architects W. V. and A. R. Gough, it is a large Perpendicular Gothic Revival church of red Pennant stone with Arts and Crafts detailing, and is sometimes described as the "Cathedral of East Bristol". The church originated as a mission district formed in 1904 from parts of neighbouring parishes, and developed around an earlier hall opened in 1905 on the site west of the present church. The church is a Grade II listed building.

The former church hall was refurbished in the late 1990s and turned into the Beehive Centre, a day facility associated with a new almshouse on the site of the former vicarage, administered by the Bristol & Anchor Almshouse Charity. Since 2012 the parish has been united with that of St Leonard's, Redfield (now St Marina Coptic Church), and the parish is formally titled St Ambrose with St Leonard.

== History ==
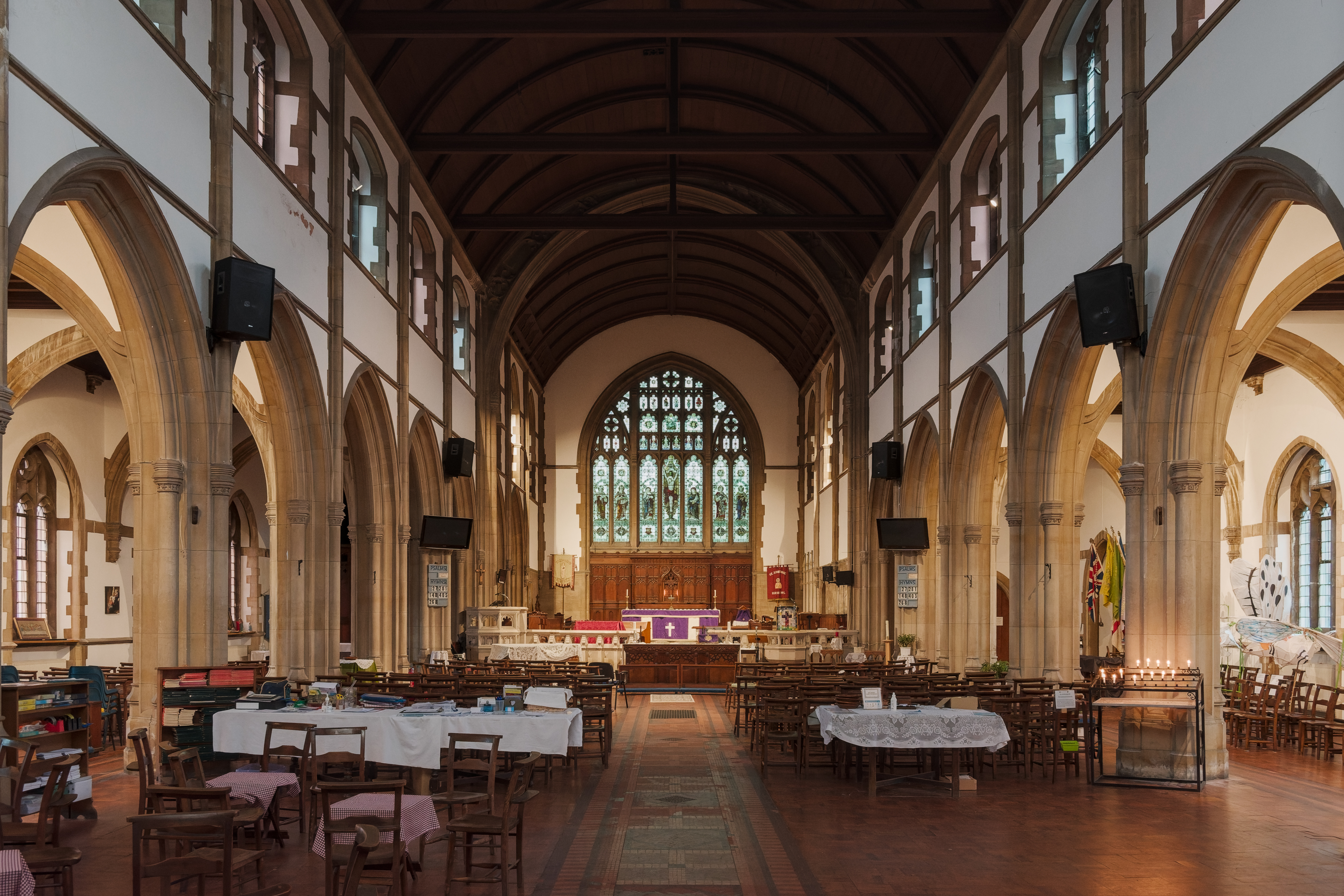
Interior of the church facing east

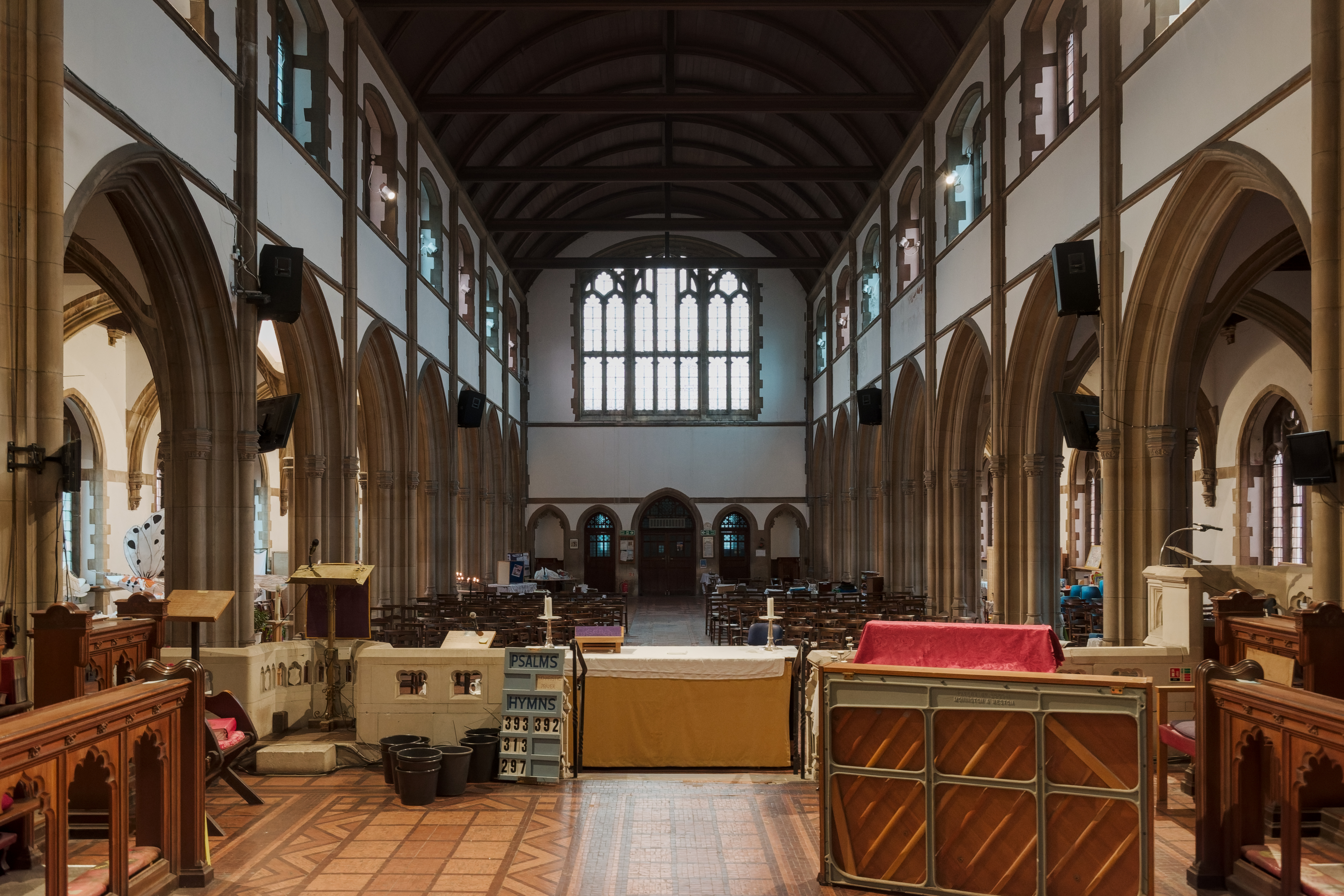
Interior of the church facing west

The church originated as a mission initiative from the city-centre parish of St John the Baptist (St John's-on-the-Wall) in response to population decline in the historic centre and rapid housing development and industrialisation in east Bristol. A mission district was formed in 1904 from the northern part of St George parish, with a small area also drawn from that of St Matthew's Church, and work began on a site overlooking St George Park. The parish hall (used initially as a mission church and for other activities) was opened on 7 December 1905 and was soon supplemented as congregational and Sunday school attendance grew. In the early years the district was organised on parish-style lines, with vestry meetings approving accounts and appointing wardens, sidesmen, and a church council, despite the district not yet having the legal status of a fully constituted parish. A building fund was established in 1906, and a formal building committee followed in 1908, amid difficulties with ground conditions which required deep and expensive foundations. Philip Ashby Phelps (rector of St John the Baptist, 1885–1907) was later commemorated at St Ambrose as having taken a sustained personal interest in the work up to his death in October 1907. Phelps was a Wiltshire-born clergyman and former schoolmaster, educated at Marlborough College and The Queen's College, Oxford, who spent much of his earlier career teaching (including a long period at Clifton College) before serving in Clifton parishes and then as rector of St John the Baptist with St Lawrence from 1885. In Bristol he was involved in a range of civic and church organisations, including work associated with housing reform and adult education, and he was also active in the city's music scene.

By 1907 additional space for Sunday school and meetings had been added at the mission church, including a new room dedicated by the Bishop of Bristol. The building cost £600 and was funded by John Gardiner, with an offertory taken at the dedication to support an assistant curate. John Gardiner (d. 1929) was a Bristol businessman associated with Gardiner Son and Co. of Nelson Street, now in business as Gardiner Haskins, and he was active in church affairs at St John the Baptist, including service as a vestryman and, at one time, churchwarden. At St Ambrose he was remembered as a major benefactor, is credited with funding elements of the church complex (including the tower) and, later, donating the initial ring of eight bells dedicated in 1928. The extension led to rapid growth in attendance, with the new room seating about 180 children while around 320 were then attending on Sundays, and that the hall used for services had been outgrown to the point that separate Sunday evening services were being arranged for juveniles and adults. In the same period, Gardiner also offered to provide a further hall at his own expense to relieve pressure on Sunday school and weekday classes, designed to harmonise with the existing buildings and capable of subdivision by a movable partition.

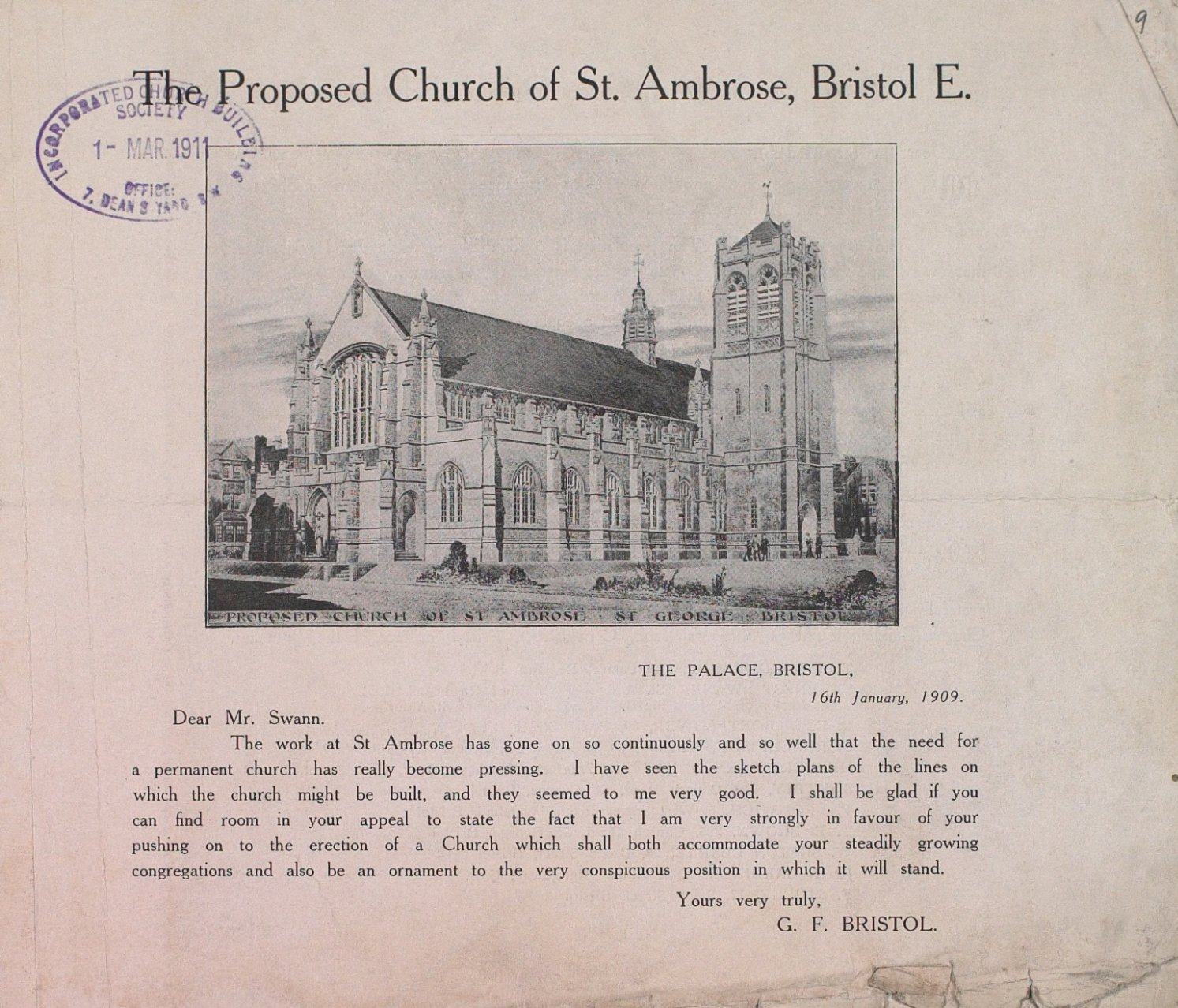
The approved design submitted to the Incorporated Church Building Society, 1911

Designs for a large permanent church were prepared by W. V. and A. R. Gough in a Perpendicular Gothic style, with a planned seating capacity of 716 that could be expanded for special occasions. Financial support for construction came from a mixture of local giving and diocesan or institutional grants, together with substantial private donations, including gifts associated with John Gardiner and the Bristol church extension committee. As fundraising progressed, the building programme shifted away from the standard incremental approach of churchbuilding. Reporting in 1911 described a pledge by Gardiner to add a further £1,000 on condition that the committee avoided building in sections and instead undertook the whole church at once, partly to prevent duplicated costs and later disruption. By mid-1912 the need for a permanent church was framed as pressing, with funds reported as roughly £8,000 paid or promised against a scheme expected to exceed £10,000, and with cost increases attributed to the subsoil and the discovery of old surface coal workings requiring deeper foundations. Building work began in May 1912, and the foundation stone was laid later that year.

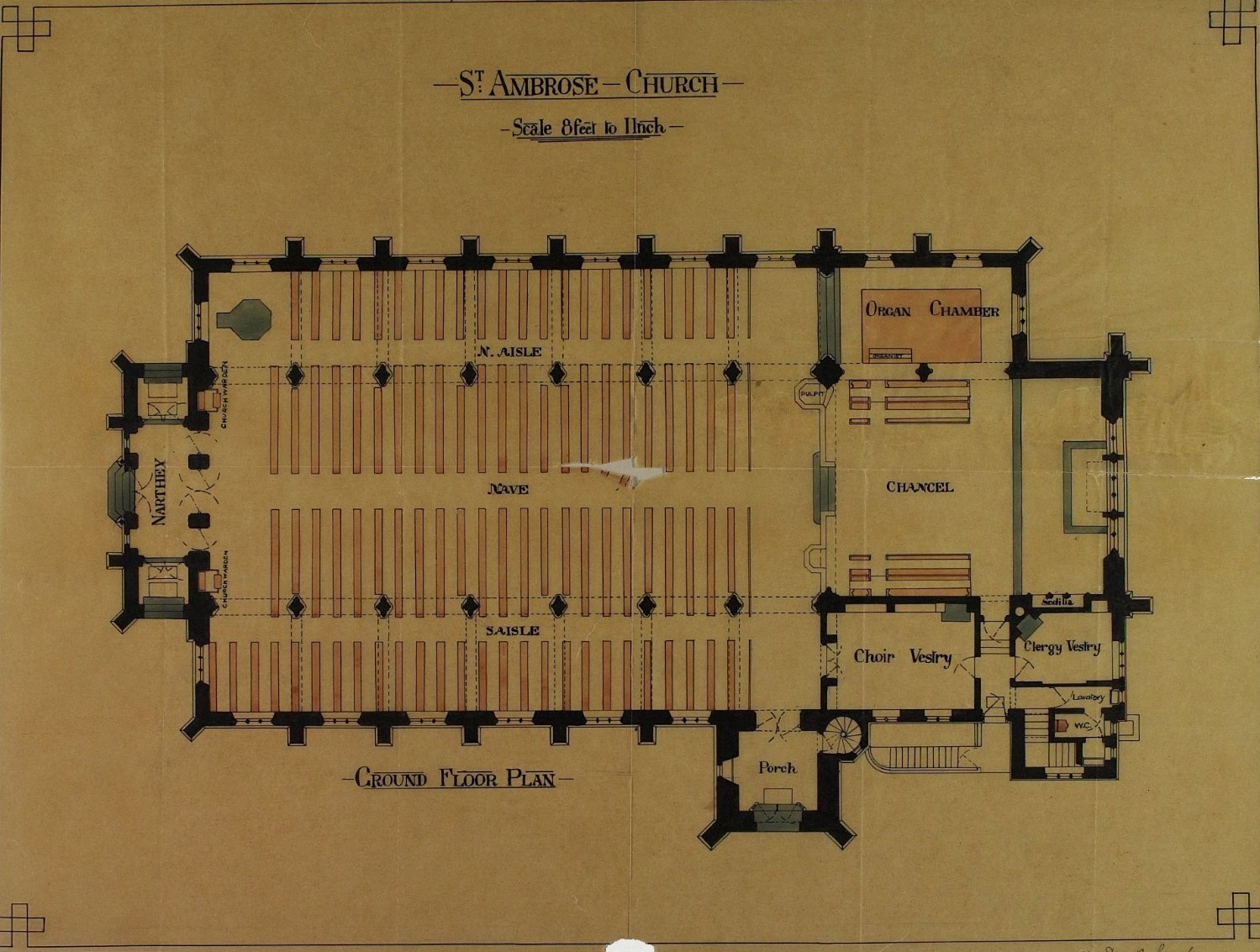
The floor plan of the church, by W. V. and A. R. Gough, 1911-1913

As expected by its donors, St Ambrose was completed in a single phase and opened with its principal internal fittings, organ, and a stained-glass east window in place, with the remaining major planned work being a peal of bells. A large room was created over the vestries for classes and choir practice, and recessed seating formed within the west wall. Contemporary estimates of the cost differed, with one report giving £10,250 and another recording a figure of over £13,300, in each case with seating for roughly 700 people. The parish population was about 6,200 in 1914.

In 1915 the creation of a new ecclesiastical parish was discussed in relation to boundaries around St George Park, including the practical effects on the formalities and fees associated with marriages and burials, where parish boundaries determined the reading of banns and the classification of parishioners and non-parishioners. The parish was constituted as a separate parish by an Order in Council dated 24 September 1915, with the vestry of St John the Baptist acting as patrons and nominating the Rev. Samuel Ernest Swann as the first vicar, subject to a dispensation to hold both benefices. His institution and induction took place in mid-November 1915, and was described not as the start of a new ministry in the district, but as the culmination of the long process from mission district to fully constituted parish. Swann was already known in Bristol before his appointment as the first vicar, as by 1908 he had already served as missioner at St Ambrose, and he later succeeded Phelps as rector of St John the Baptist following Phelps's death in 1907. Phelps had earlier served as chaplain to the Lord Mayor of Bristol in the 1870s. He had also previously been domestic chaplain to the Bishop of Liverpool, and served curacies including Southport (1901–1904), before taking up the Bristol post.

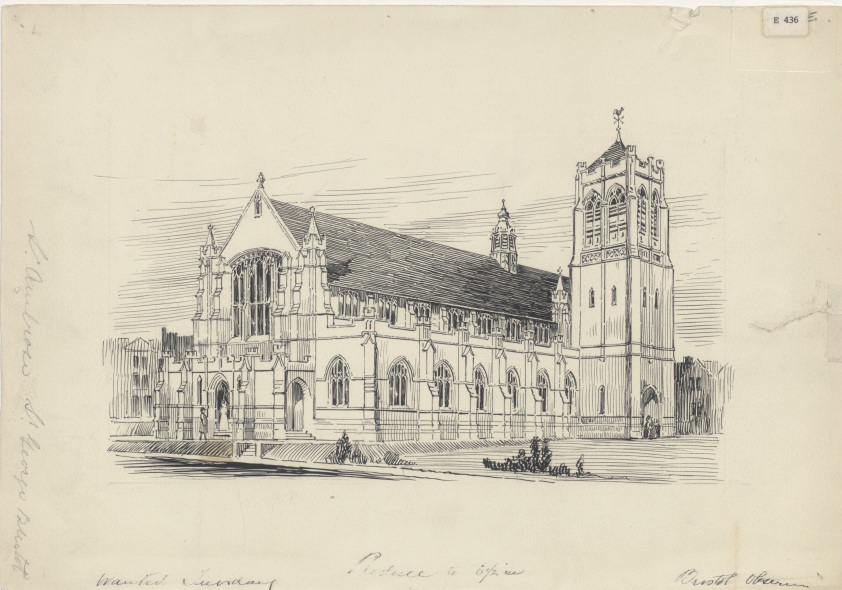
Ink drawing by Samuel Loxton of the church

In November 1915 a dedication festival was held in the parish hall, with around 400 attending a tea followed by a concert and musical programme. The occasion included presentations to the vicar, the Rev. E. S. Swann, and to the lay benefactor John Gardiner, with two framed and illuminated addresses (including illustrations of St John the Baptist and St Ambrose) read aloud during the evening. The address to Swann marked his institution as vicar and referred to ten years of work in the district, during which the parish hall, children's hall, church, and tower had been built; the address to Gardiner thanked him for sustained support and for funding (at his own expense) the children's hall, the clergy house, and the tower, as well as for broader financial help towards the church and its agencies.

In December 1945 the Parochial Church Council launched a peace thanksgiving appeal for £500 intended for a memorial to those who died in World War II, alongside works including dismantling, cleaning, and re-conditioning the organ, and repairs to the fabric of the church.

In the 1950s the parish developed a programme of organised visiting and outreach. In 1955 a house-to-house campaign was planned to contact every household in the parish, carried out by lay volunteers calling in pairs and distributing printed invitation cards for services. In 1954 the parish, under the Rev. Michael Hocking, was described as adopting central patterns of worship and customary furnishings following the retirement of the Rev. F. S. Lee, alongside efforts to increase the circulation of the parish magazine and recruit Sunday school teachers. In 1957, Hocking also set out a parish emphasis on family worship as a principal Sunday service, coupled with the expectation that the day should combine worship, rest, and recreation. In September 1958 the church hosted a visit by the Bishop of Ondo-Benin, Solomon Odunaiya Odutola, who preached at the family communion service and later led a discussion in the Gardiner Hall. In the same period the parish ran a practice of sending birthday cards to children baptised at St Ambrose on their first, second, and third anniversaries, organised by congregation member Bert Smith.

In the late 1990s the former church hall was refurbished as a day centre for older people, known as the Beehive Centre, and a new almshouse was developed on the site of the former vicarage, next to the church. The Bristol & Anchor Almshouse Charity was formed in 1999 through the merger of several Bristol almshouse charities, including the Bristol (St John and St Ambrose) Almshouse Charity, and administers the almshouses and day services.

In 2007-09 the church suffered repeated lead thefts from its roof, resulting in extensive water ingress and damage to the organ. Insurance supported repairs to the building fabric, while fundraising was organised locally towards a stated £10,000 for organ repairs, including sales and other events held at the church.

== Community and ministry ==
From the early years of the mission district the parish developed extensive weekday and Sunday organisations, including Bible classes and Sunday school provision, and relied on fundraising schemes and grants to support additional clergy and staff. Mid-20th-century parish life included organised visiting campaigns, youth organisations linked to the church, and an emphasis on family worship and regular attendance at services by the Rev. Hocking. Around this time, the church also maintained a large Sunday school alongside Scouts and Guides, Cubs and Brownies, the Church Lads' Brigade, a Sunday night youth club, and other sports clubs.

In the 1950s the parish also pursued closer working with nearby denominations. In 1955 a weekly Saturday prayer meeting was agreed to alternate between St Ambrose and Whitehall Methodist Church, described as part of a deliberate move towards practical co-operation in the area. In 1959 this approach was extended through two successive Sundays of shared worship, with each congregation attending the other church for the evening service, stated as having received the Bishop of Bristol's consent.

Since 2012, the parish has been united with the dissolved parish of St Leonard, Redfield, and the joint parish is now titled St Ambrose with St Leonard. The church is part of a wider grouping of east Bristol Anglican parishes described as the East Bristol Partnership of Anglican Churches.

== Architecture and fittings ==
The building is constructed in squared red Pennant stone with limestone dressings under tiled roofs, and is planned around an aisled nave and broad chancel, with a south porch and a south tower. Externally it is heavily buttressed, with the tower and other vertical elements finished with small crenellated turrets and spirelets that reinforce the Perpendicular character. The east end is dominated by a large Perpendicular-style window, and the west front is arranged with a narthex beneath a wide multi-light window and a central entrance with detached shafts.

Inside, the nave runs to seven bays and the chancel to three, with the arcades carried on compound shafts whose attached members rise towards the nave roof, and with transverse arches dividing the aisle bays; much of the walling and structural work is in ashlar, giving the interior a comparatively unified, masonry-led character for a church of its date. A distinctive octagonal leaded lantern with a small dome formerly rose over the chancel arch, and the sanctuary incorporates a set of three sedilia. At the time of the consecration, the internal finishes included mosaic paving in the chancel and circulation areas, pitch-pine blocks beneath the seating, and a combined hot-air and low-pressure hot-water heating system.

Stonework fittings include the pulpit, lectern and altar rail, and the church retains a substantial group of early-20th-century Gothic Revival detailing associated with its original completion. Inscriptions within the church link several of these fittings to commemoration of Philip Ashby Phelps, including the pulpit and associated chancel work, while a separate tablet also connects the origins of St Ambrose to the vestry initiative at St John the Baptist in 1905; the font is inscribed as a gift from the children of the St Ambrose Sunday School in 1913. Contemporary description also recorded stuccoed internal walls, mosaic tiling in circulation areas, wood-block flooring beneath the seating and teak joinery, with the main contract carried out by the Bristol builders R. F. Ridd and Sons. The organ was built by T. W. Lewis of Bristol to a design by Grahame H. Wills.

In 1958 a new altar and frontal were installed as a memorial to the Rev. Ernest Swann, described as being made of teak with a cloth of gold frontal and given by an anonymous donor. In 1980 the church received a set of newly made kneelers produced over a two-year period by a volunteer group within the congregation, with designs said to draw on biblical themes and the church's stained glass.

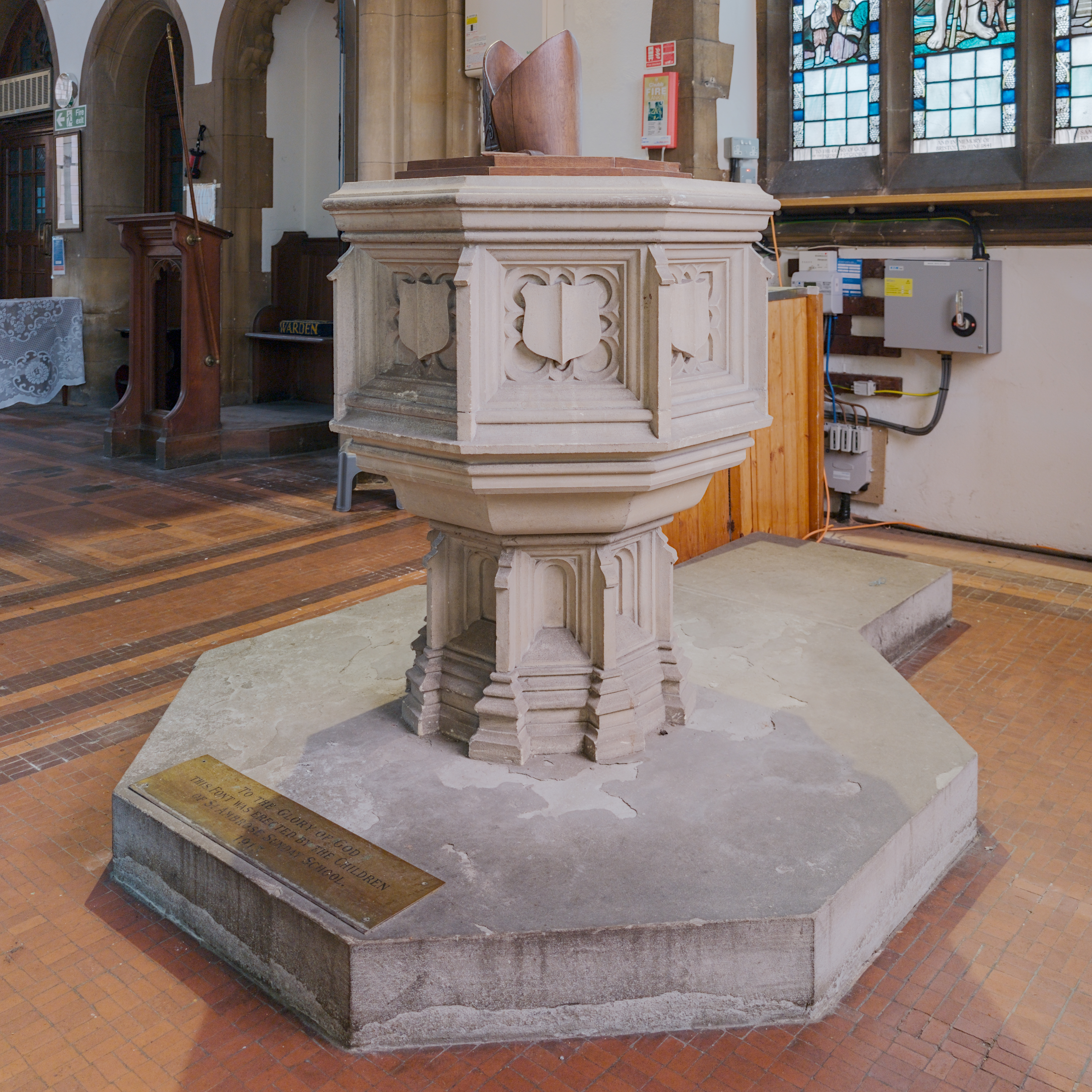
Font

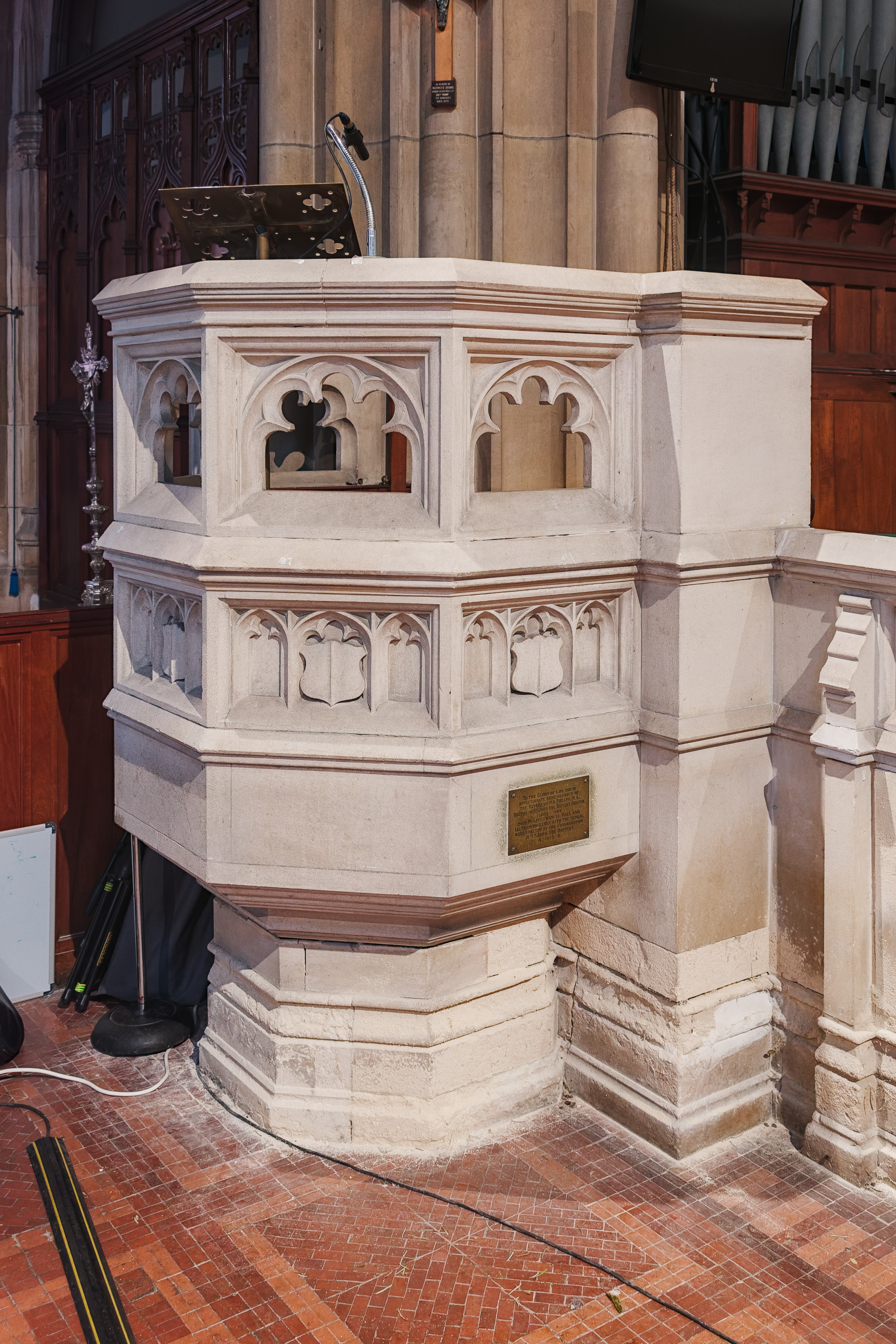
Stone pulpit

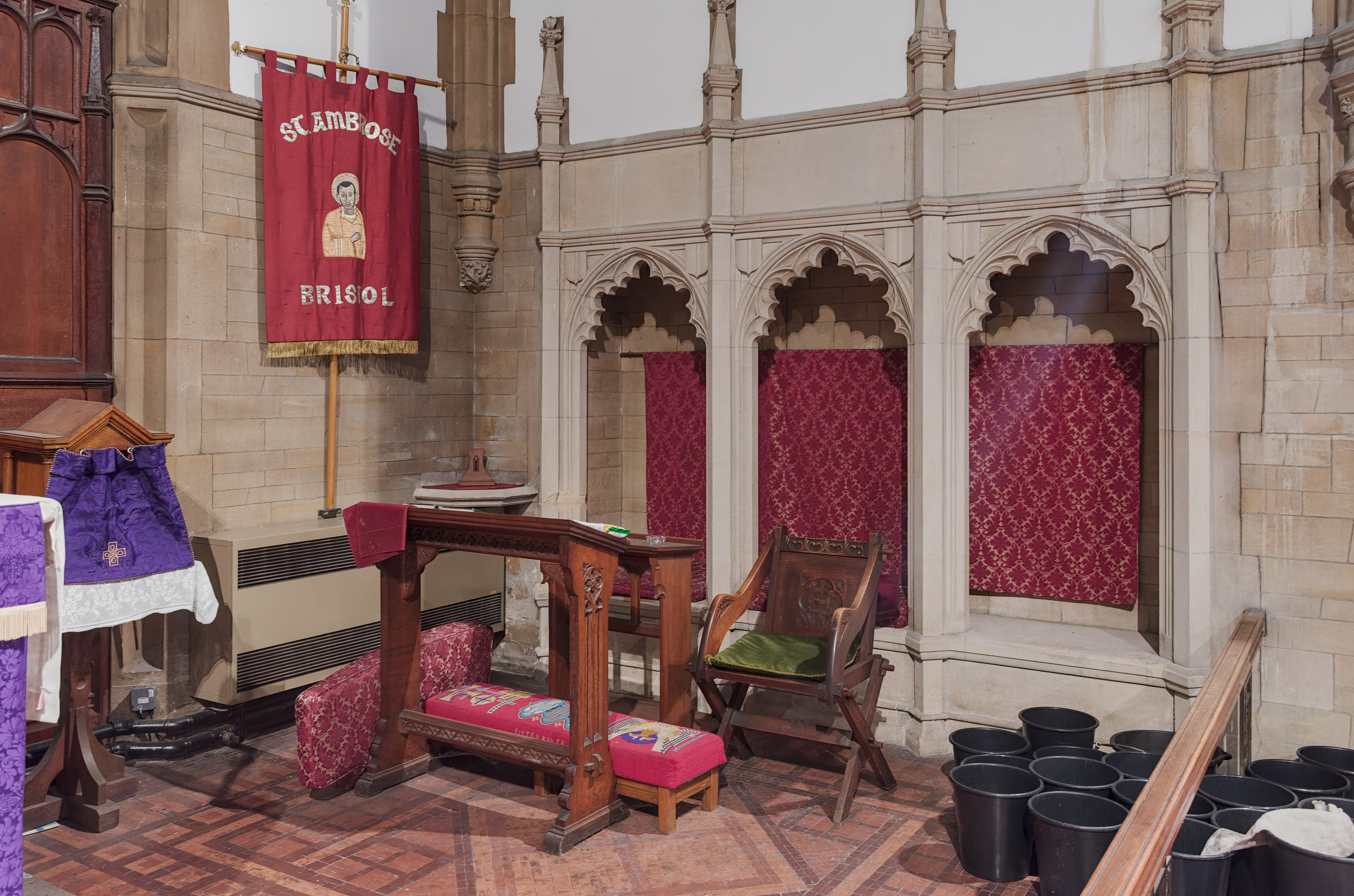
Sedilia

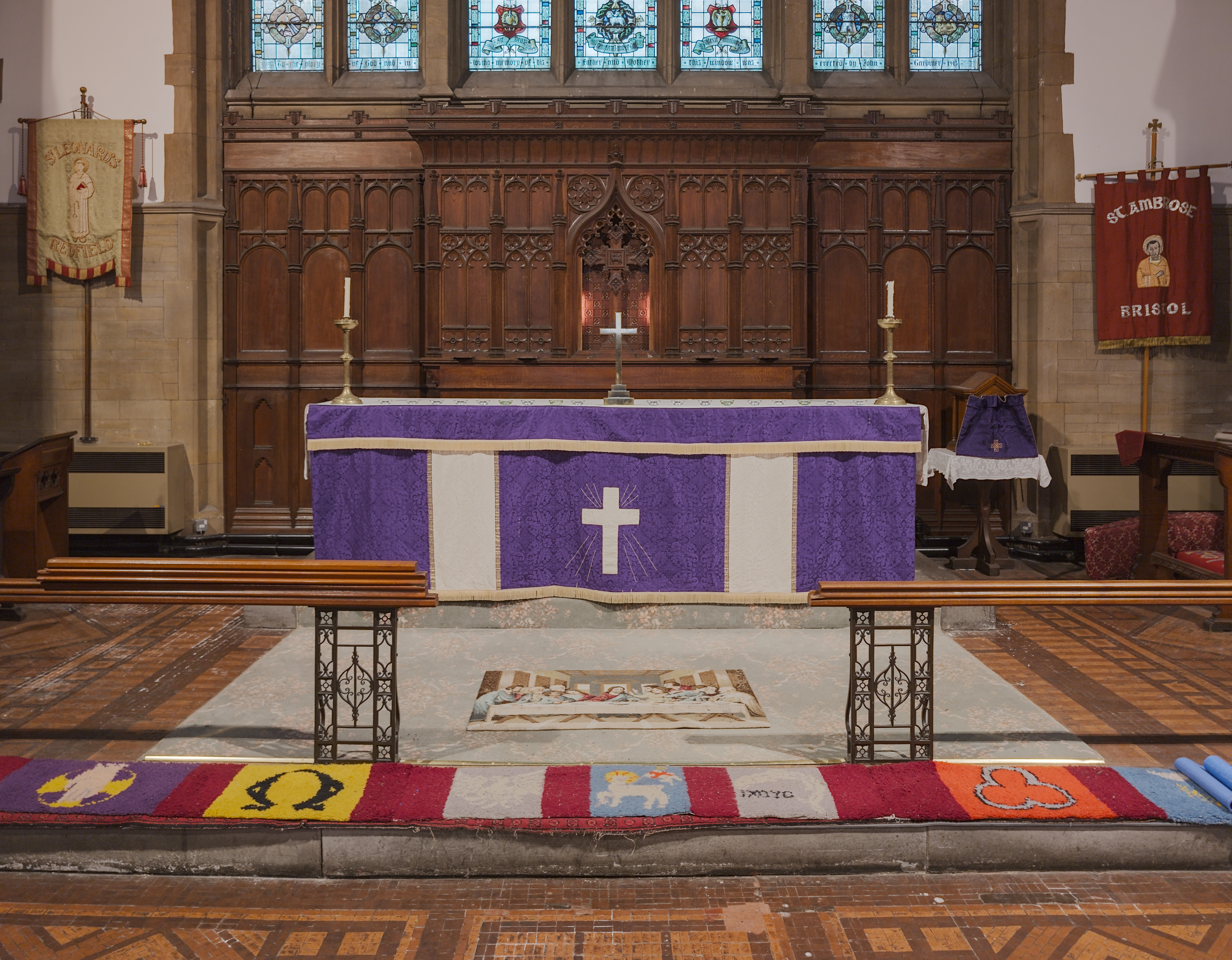
Sanctuary

=== Church monuments ===
War memorials associated with the parish include a carved oak tablet in the church listing 99 men commemorated as having died in the First World War, and a separate memorial tablet unveiled in the parish hall for members of the Church Lads' Brigade platoon who died in the same conflict. The main tablet features carved detail in Gothic style and has raised, gilded lettering, and was made by Harry Hems and Sons of Exeter. A memorial tablet to Philip Ashby Phelps is also present.

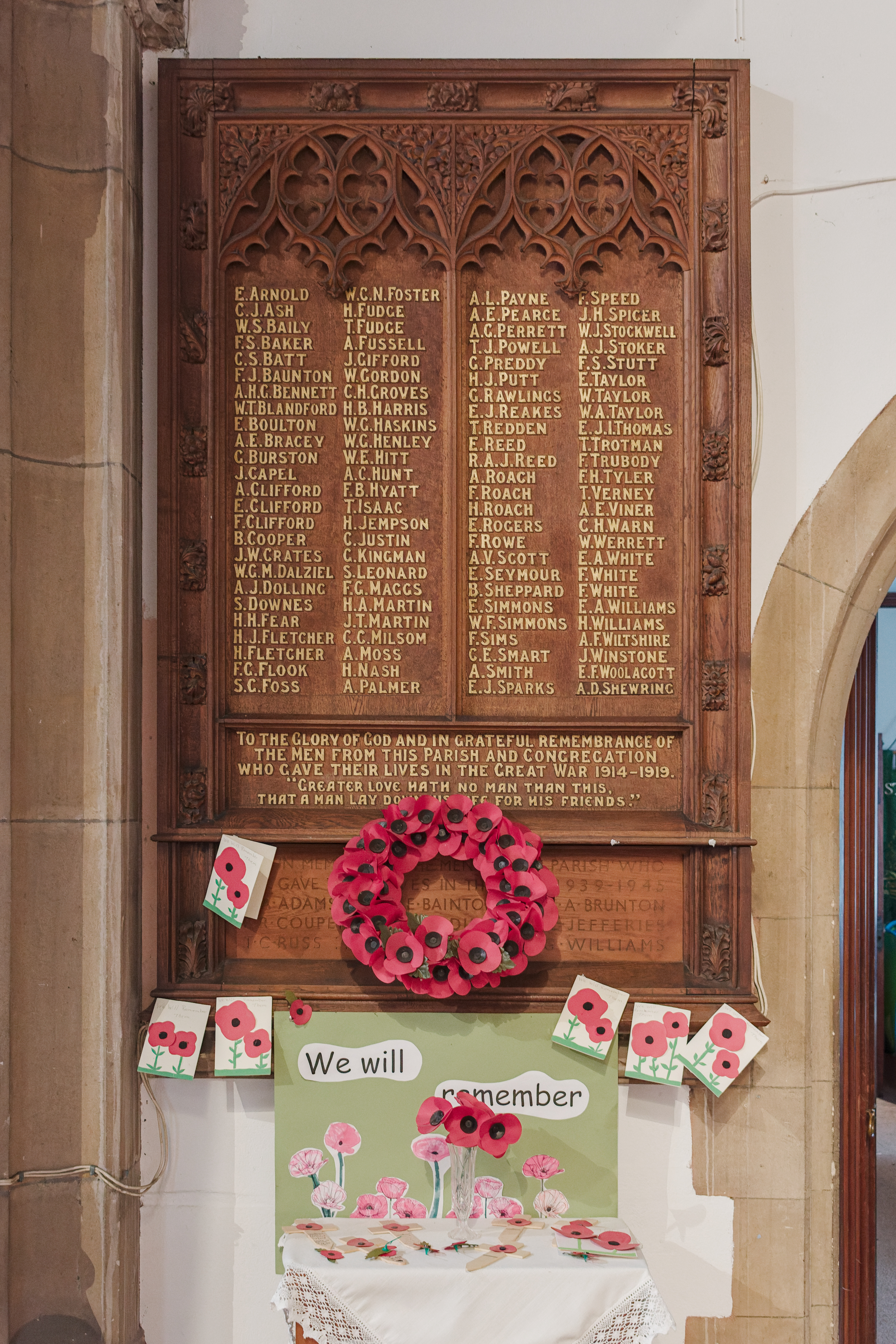
War memorial

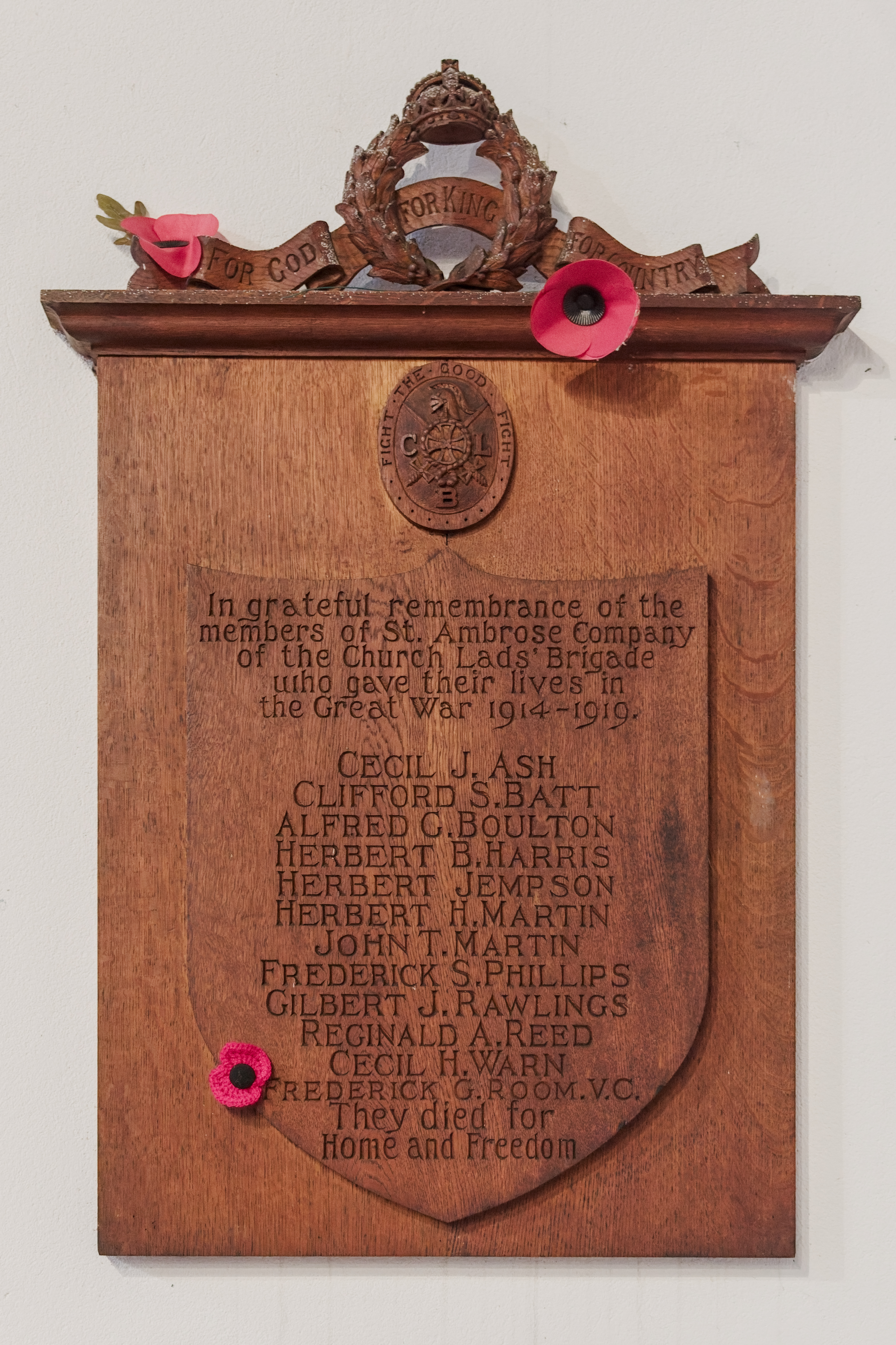
Church Lads' Brigade memorial

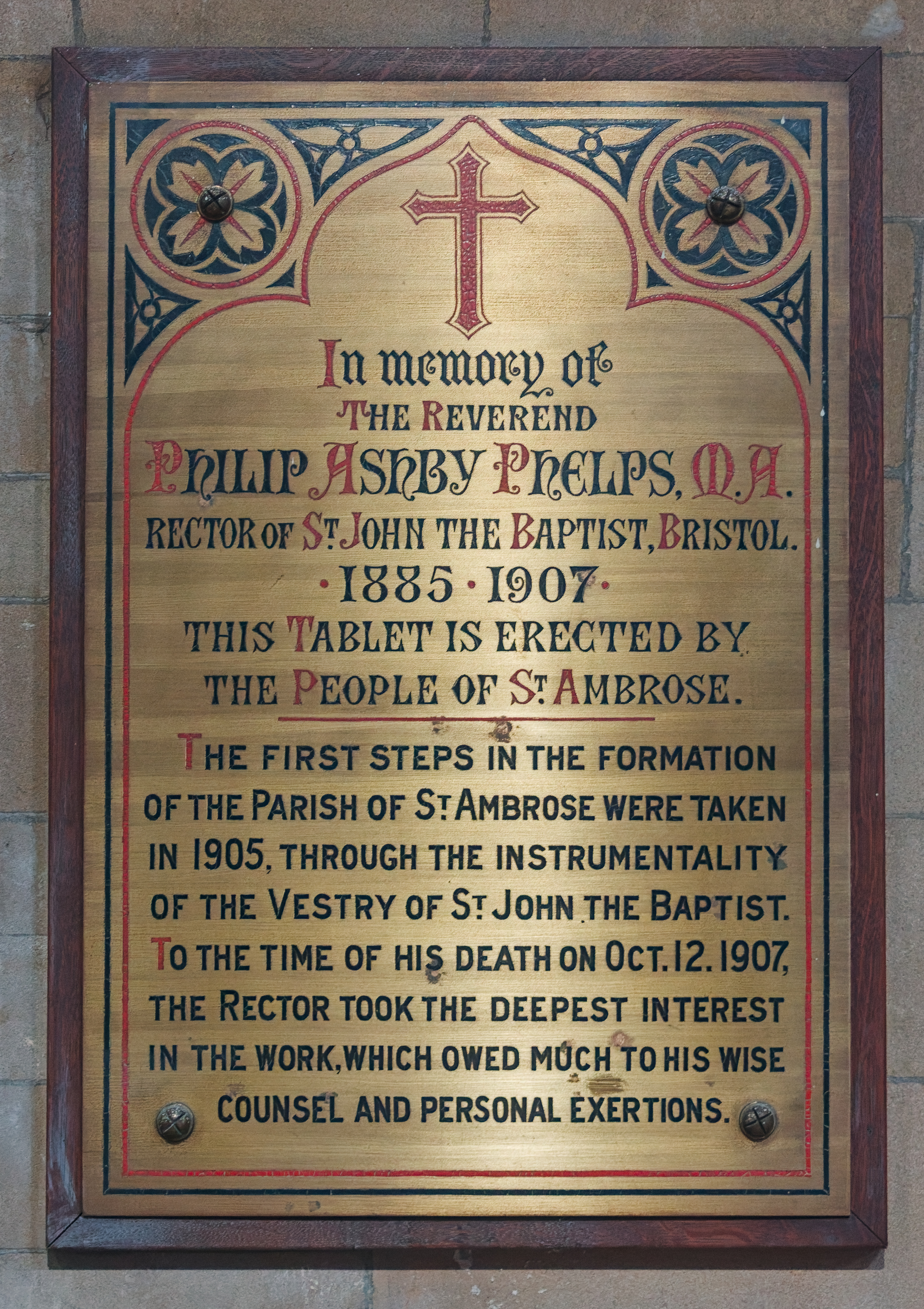
Plaque to Philip Ashby Phelps

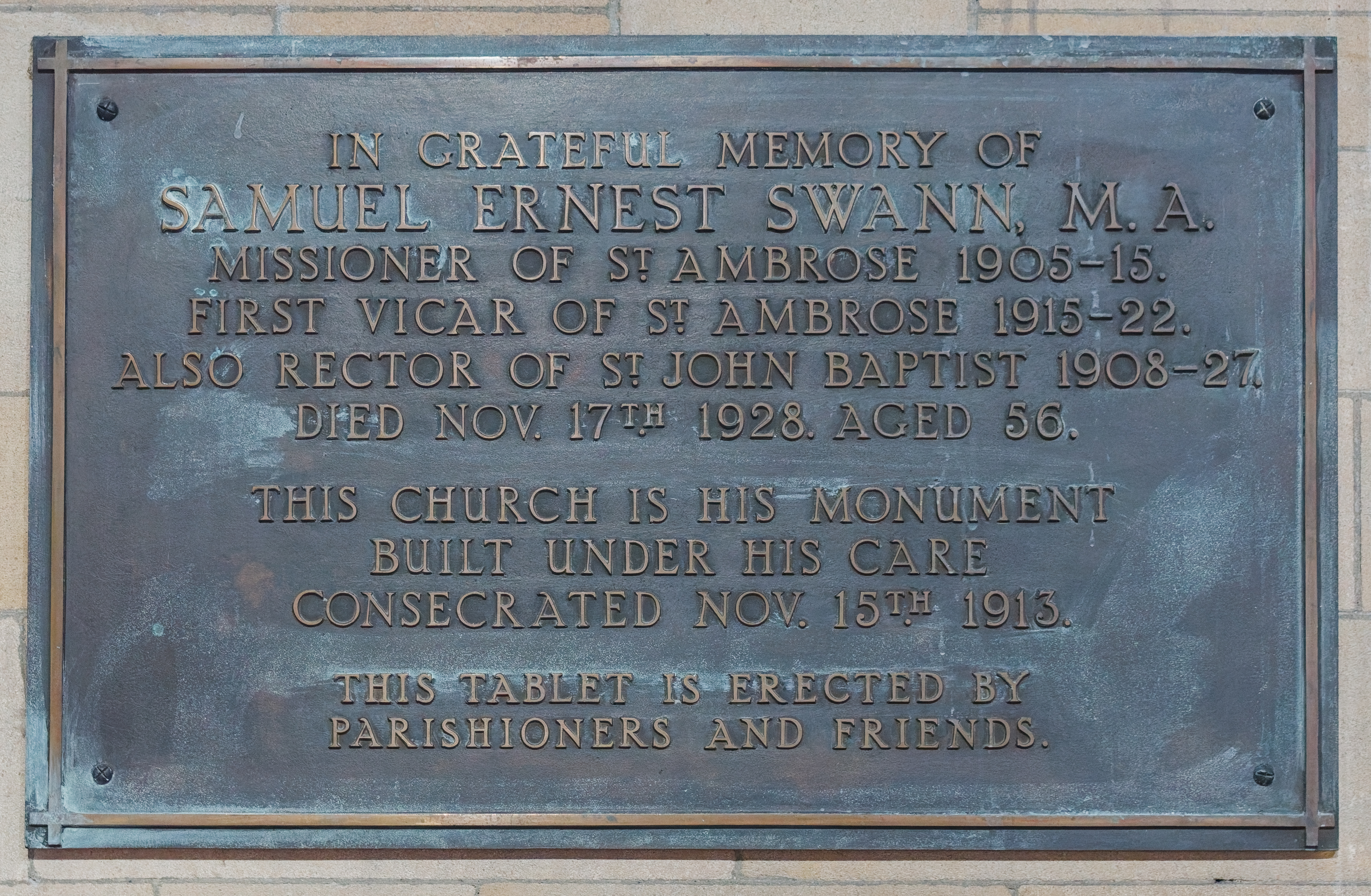
Plaque to Samuel Ernest Swann

=== Stained-glass windows ===
Window dedicated to John Gardiner, Percy Bacon, 1913

Samuel Betty memorial window, possibly Arnold Wathen Robinson, 1924

The church features stained glass of 1913 by Percy Bacon in the east window, and a north aisle window in the style of Arnold Robinson. The north aisle window is dedicated to Samuel Betty and was unveiled by the Bishop of Bristol on 29 June 1924, a gift of his daughter Miss A. D. Betty that depicts St John the Baptist with scenes from his life. Samuel Betty (d. 1922), a St George resident and principal of the firm Betty Brothers (hat and cap merchants of Victoria Street), was a long-standing local public figure, having served on the former St George Local Board and later represented Redcliff Ward on Bristol City Council. He was also associated with church life in Bristol, having served as a churchwarden at St Thomas the Martyr, and for a number of years at St George's Church, and was a benefactor to several other city churches.

=== Bells ===
The tower contains a ring of ten bells hung for full-circle ringing, with the ring created and installed in 1928 by Mears & Stainbank, with the first eight acquired in 1928 when John Gardiner donated them. Two bells (treble and second) were added in 1980 by the Whitechapel Bell Foundry. The 1980 bells were installed following fundraising by local bell-ringers and were dedicated at a service attended by about 150 people, with the Bishop of Malmesbury conducting the dedication.

=== Ancillary buildings ===
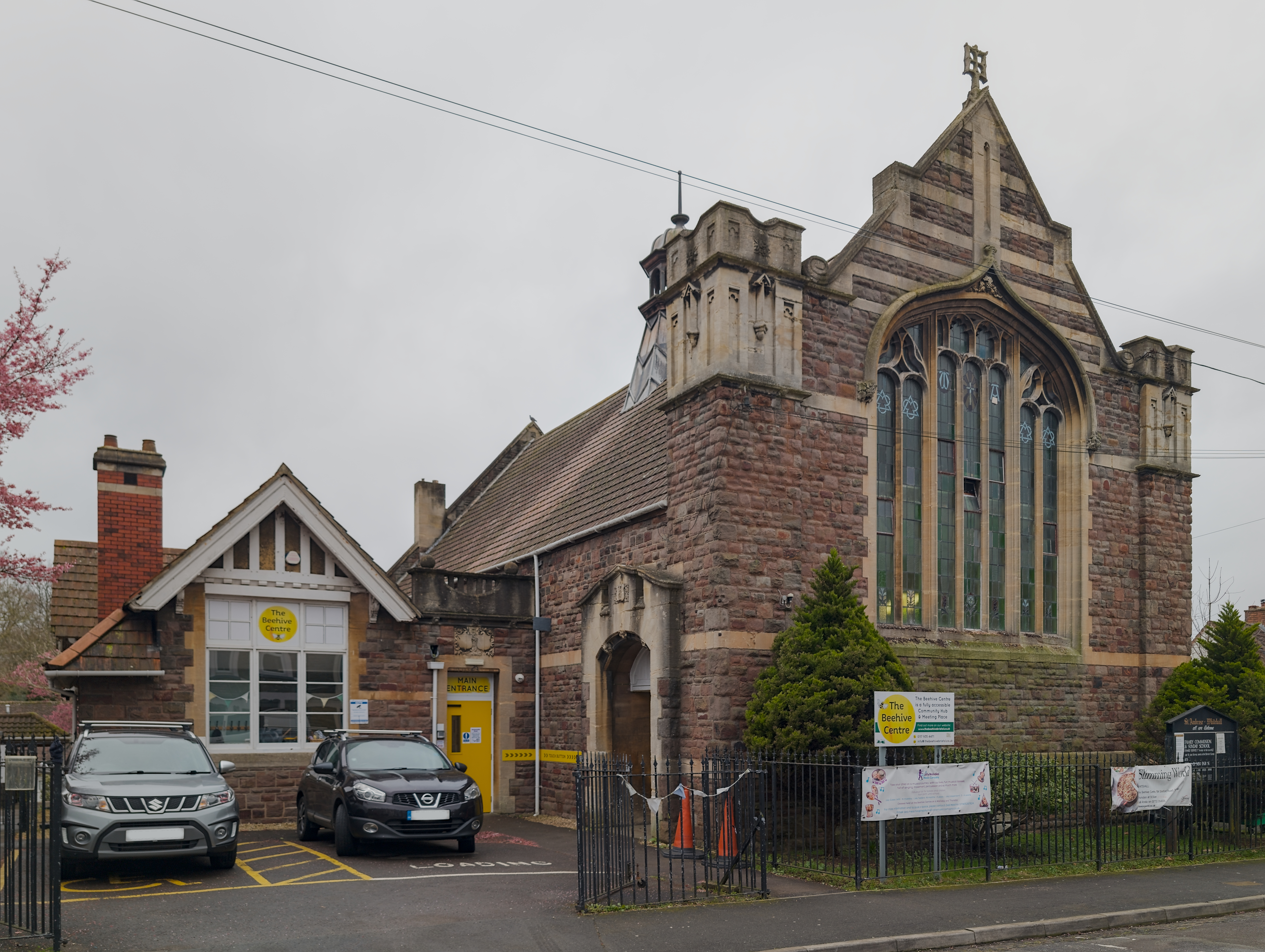
The Beehive Centre, located in the former church hall that neighbours the main building

The original mission building of 1905 survives as the Beehive Centre, formerly the church hall, to the west of the church. The earlier hall is described as more overtly Arts and Crafts in character and was designed by H. C. M. Hirst (1905), with a second hall added in 1907. As rebuilt and extended in the early 20th century, the two halls became a linked group of single-storey ranges in red Pennant with limestone dressings, with the principal roadside elevation dominated by a large Perpendicular-style traceried window set within a broad arched surround, and gabled rooflines finished with stone copings and a cross finial. Entrances and subsidiary blocks incorporate more domestic Arts and Crafts motifs, including a low parapet with finials and a smaller attached hall with a prominent stone porch.

A clergy house was added to the site in 1908, intended in time for assistant clergy but serving initially as a vicarage, with Swann already in residence. It was described as substantially built of pennant stone with freestone dressings, erected by F. Chown to designs by W. S. Paul and James, and forming a prominent addition to the growing group of mission buildings beside the hall.

In 1936 the St Ambrose troop of Boy Scouts opened a new timber headquarters hut near the church after preparatory groundworks and fundraising by the troop. The hut was designed with assistance from the architect Mark Hartland Thomas and opened by the county commissioner, J. L. Milligan.

In the late 1990s the hall was converted into the Beehive Centre day facility linked to the Bristol & Anchor almshouse scheme adjoining the church, and the site includes almshouse accommodation overlooking St George Park administered by the Bristol & Anchor Almshouse Charity. The older almshouse (a terrace of eight cottages, built in an Arts and Crafts idiom) forms an L-shaped group with a taller corner block, using matching Pennant stone and limestone dressings with upper-storey timbering, and a sequence of cottage doorways and bay windows.

== List of incumbents ==
| Dates | Name | Office | Notes |
|---|---|---|---|
| 1905 – 1915 | Samuel Ernest Swann | Missioner | Missioner of the conventional/mission district, and later nominated as first vicar when the parish was constituted by Order in Council (24 September 1915). |
| 1915 | Samuel Ernest Swann | Vicar | Instituted as the first vicar in mid-November 1915, with a dispensation to hold both benefices. |
| 1916 – 1920 | Samuel Ernest Swann | Vicar | A later memorial tablet stated he was first vicar 1916–20, alongside his earlier missionership, and also recorded him as rector of St John Baptist (City) from 1908 to 1927. |
| 1922 | George James Jarvis | Vicar | Offered the benefice on Swann's resignation and accepted. |
| 1927 – 1931 | F. G. Walmsley | Vicar | Vicar from 1927; in 1931 he accepted the living of Alveston, Gloucestershire, after earlier ministry including curacies and incumbencies at Malmesbury, St Paul's (Portland Square), and St Paul's, Chippenham. He later resigned from Alveston in 1950 after more than four decades as a parish priest, and intended to remain in Bristol and continue ministry in retirement. |
| 1931 | F. S. Lee | Vicar | Collated and inducted in August 1931, having previously served at St Peter's, Clifton Wood, and succeeding Walmsley; the service was conducted in the presence of the Bishop of Bristol and clergy from nearby parishes. His wife, Frances Lee, was active in parish life at St Ambrose, including the Mothers' Union. |
| 1954 – 1962 | Michael Hocking | Vicar | Ordained in 1936, he served as a naval chaplain during World War II and was later vicar of Madron, Cornwall, before coming to St Ambrose in 1954. He left in 1962 to become rector of Holy Trinity, Guildford. The Evening Post described him as "one of Bristol's most outspoken and progressive vicars". While at Guildford he was elected by diocesan clergy as a proctor to represent them in church synodical bodies, and he later returned to preach at a televised service from Holy Trinity. |
| 1962 | Richard Saunders | Vicar | Appointed from the parish of Eastwood, Rotherham, where he had served for eight years. He had previously spent time in India and his father, the Rt Rev Charles Saunders (formerly Bishop of Lucknow), was then living in Clifton and active in diocesan and civic chaplaincy roles. |
| 1977 | George Mitchell | Rector (team) and vicar | Inducted at St Ambrose in September 1977 as rector for a linked group of five East Bristol churches, while also serving as vicar of St Ambrose. The induction was performed by the Bishop of Malmesbury. |
| | David James | Vicar | |
| | Nicola Coleman | Vicar | |

== See also ==
- List of churches in Bristol
- Grade II listed buildings in Bristol
