= Troopers Hill =

Local nature reserve in Bristol, England

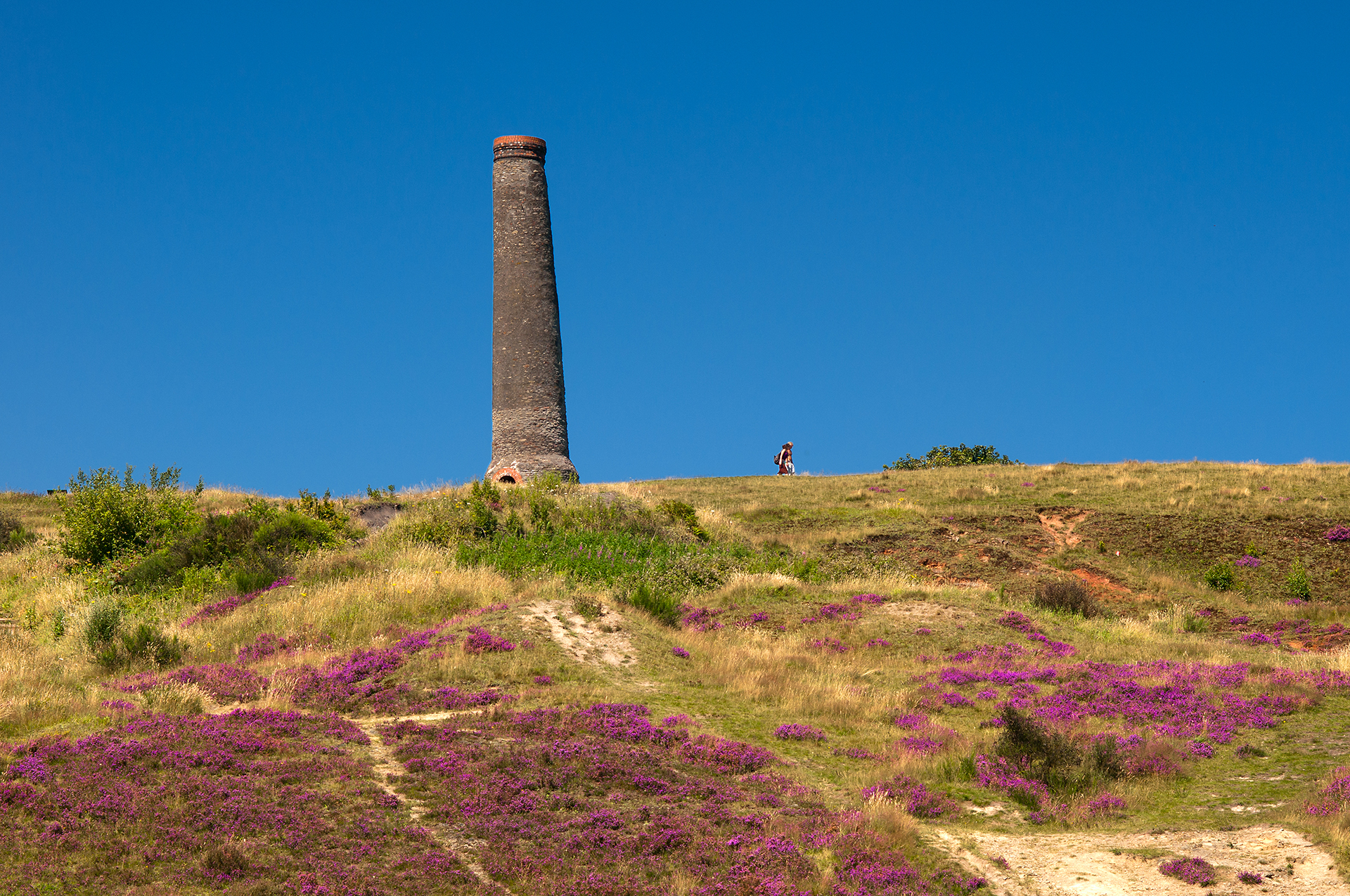
- The 18th-century smelting chimney at the summit with clusters of heather flowers visible below.
- Interactive map of Troopers Hill
- Location: St George, Bristol, England
- Coordinates: 51.455364°N 2.534741°W
- Area: 8.5 ha (21 acres)
- Designation: Local Nature Reserve
- Designated: 1995
- Operator: Bristol City Council

Troopers Hill is a steep, southwest-facing hillside of pennant sandstone overlooking the River Avon in the St George district of Bristol, England. Managed by Bristol City Council and the volunteer Friends of Troopers Hill group, it was designated as a Local Nature Reserve (LNR) in 1995 and covers about 8.5 ha (21 acres). The reserve is noted for its industrial archaeology, including a Grade II-listed smelting chimney, and for heathland habitats that have developed on the acidic soils left by quarrying and mining. From 2007 to 2013, the site consistently received the Green Flag Award from Keep Britain Tidy.

== History ==
The hill is within the area of the former King's Wood, a royal hunting forest, which was present here until at least the 17th century. During the English Civil War, Parliamentary troops under Sir Thomas Fairfax camped on the hill before the 1645 siege of Bristol, one of several events that may explain the modern name.

Industrial use began in the late 18th century when copper smelting works were established on the riverside; the tall, slightly leaning brick chimney near the summit, built in the 1790s, vented the furnaces below. In the 19th century the hill was mined for coal and fireclay, and a second square chimney at the foot of the slope served an engine house working the coal seams. Quarrying for pennant sandstone further reshaped the hillside.

Bristol City Council bought the land in 1956 for £600 after parts of the slope had been used for rubble disposal during post-war redevelopment. Formal protection as an LNR followed in 1995, and a series of management plans to guide conservation in partnership with the Friends of Troopers Hill have been enacted, most recently a 10-year plan adopted in 2020.

The volunteer group Friends of Troopers Hill was founded in 2003 to organise monthly conservation work parties, wildlife surveys and public events, operating under a management plan agreed with the council.

In 2015, Troopers Hill was one of several locations searched in St George during canvassing by the Avon and Somerset Police as part of the search for murdered teenager Becky Watts.

In 2016, Bristol City Council erected scaffolding on the site and undertook maintenance of the chimney, also establishing a children's playground in the park.

In December 2022 the summit chimney was extensively spray-painted, prompting a police investigation.

Emergency services mounted a rescue on 6 February 2025 following concern for an individual’s welfare; the reserve was temporarily closed during the operation.

== Geology and ecology ==
Troopers Hill is underlain by pennant sandstone deposited some 300 million years ago in the Carboniferous period. Historical extraction of sandstone, fireclay and coal left spoil heaps and exposed faces; weathering of these materials has produced nutrient-poor, acidic soils that support lowland heath and acid grassland uncommon elsewhere in Bristol.

The mosaic of heath, grassland and scrub hosts more than 300 recorded insect species, among them the nationally scarce Andrena integra and Nomada guttulata, first noted on the hill in 2000. Slow worms, common lizards, roe deer, foxes and badgers are frequently observed, while the open summit is a vantage point for migratory birds.

== Access and recreation ==
The hill is open at all times and reached via four pedestrian entrances on Troopers Hill Road or through Troopers Hill Field from Summerhill Terrace and Malvern Road. Way-marked paths allow for circular walks.

== See also ==
- Parks of Bristol
