= St George Park, Bristol =

Park in Bristol, England

St George Park
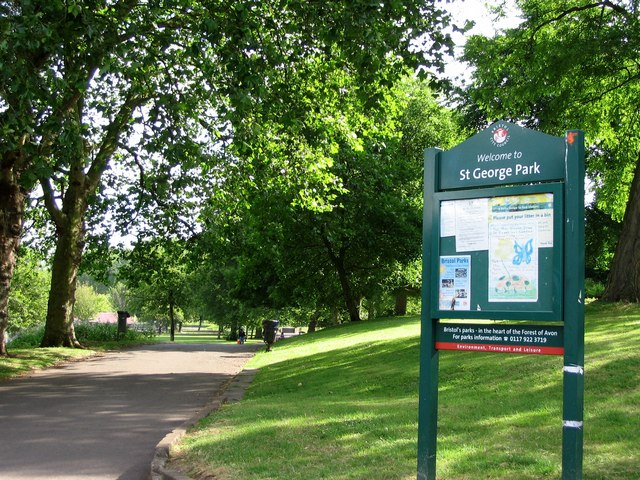
- Entrance to St George Park
- Interactive map of St George Park
- Type: Public park
- Location: St George, Bristol, England
- Coordinates: 51.461°N 2.548°W
- Area: 38 acres (15 ha)
- Created: 1894
- Designer: T. Lawrence Lewis
- Operator: Bristol City Council; Friends of St George Park
- Website: www.bristol.gov.uk/residents/museums-parks-sports-and-culture/parks-and-open-spaces/parks-and-estates/st-george-park

St George Park (often rendered as St George's Park) is a Victorian suburban park in the St George area of Bristol, England. Covering approximately 38 acres (15 ha), the park is situated between Church Road and St George High Street. It features a large duck pond, sports facilities, a skatepark, and a children's playground. The St George Library is situated on the southern edge of the park.

In the 21st century, St George Park has become the focus of community work and wildlife conservation. The park is also a venue for the annual Redfest arts festival. In the 2020s, the park received significant investment, including a biodiversity project for the lake in partnership with the Friends of St George Park and Wildfowl & Wetlands Trust, and a council-funded redevelopment of the skatepark and play facilities.

== History ==
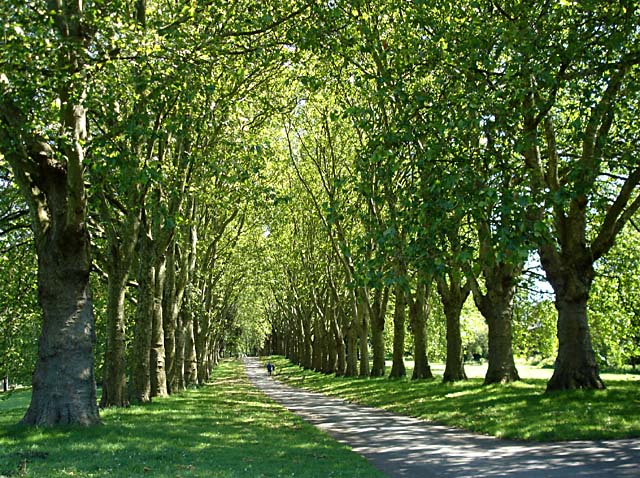
Avenue of London planes in the park

Local industrialist and MP Handel Cossham was a significant advocate for the creation of a local park for the people of Bristol East; the park was eventually laid out after his death in 1894 on 38 acres of land previously known as Fire Engine Farm. This name was derived from a Newcomen steam engine, often referred to as a "fire engine" in the 18th century, which was used to pump water out of local coal mines in the Whitehall area. The Fire Engine Inn, located opposite the park's main entrance, retains this historical namesake today. The area of St George, prior to modern development, was part of the Kingswood forest.

In 1894, the Bristol Corporation purchased about 38 acres of the Fire Engine Farm from the Ecclesiastical Commissioners for £12,000 and immediately laid out the first section as a public park. An additional portion of the estate was acquired later that year, bringing the total cost to roughly £17,000. The park was officially opened on 18 July 1894. Following the park's informal opening in July 1894, a design competition was held to determine the final layout, with the winning entry being submitted by surveyor T. Lawrence Lewis. His design established the park's boundaries, originally secured by 5.5 feet (1.7 m) high wrought iron railings. While Lewis's original planting scheme utilised chestnut trees, these failed to establish in the soil conditions and were shortly replaced by the London planes that are present in the park today.

The park's historical layout is characterised by axial paths that focus on the original wrought-iron bandstand site and a serpentine circuit around the lake. The park's facilities were expanded in the early 20th century with the completion of the bowling green between 1907 and 1908. The central bandstand, once the focal point of the axial paths, was removed in 1958, though the raised plinth remains today. This plinth, or "prospect mound", was specifically designed as a landscape feature intended to provide visitors with sweeping views of the gardens and the lake even when the bandstand was not in use. In the interwar period, the bandstand was used for an open-air school for children with special needs. Since 2012, this area has been maintained as a community garden by local volunteers, featuring raised beds for fruit and vegetables. Additional community planting projects, such as a bee and butterfly garden established near the main entrance in 2019, are supported by the Friends of St George Park and St George in Bloom groups.

At the time the park opened, St George was a civil parish in the county of Gloucestershire rather than part of Bristol's municipal area. The parish became an urban district in the 1890s and was formally annexed by the city in 1898. Subsequently, the Bristol Corporation formally took the park into its care and in July 1899 approved a further £7,000 to complete the scheme. In 1898, the park's southern boundary was graced by the construction of the Victoria Free Library, a building donated by the Wills family (of W.D. & H.O. Wills) and constructed in Neo-Jacobean style. This original structure was demolished in 1962 and replaced by the modern facility seen today, to the dismay of preservationists.

During the construction of the lake, workers discovered a cobbled track beneath the soil, leading to a belief that it exists atop a former Roman road.

The area was historically popular for fairs and community gatherings, with old photographs of the park showing that it was a popular area in the Edwardian era. The park grounds once offered space to students of the nearby (now-closed) St George Grammar School during breaks. By the early 20th century, the park also functioned as a venue for public meetings. In 1909, the Bristol Right to Work Committee held a meeting in St George Park, at which a deputation to the Lord Mayor was announced.

In September 1938, during preparations for the Second World War, the park was designated as a site for public air raid protection. Trenches were dug to a depth of 7 feet (2.1 m) to create three groups of shelters, comprising 12 units in total. A large wrought-iron cannon, which had long been a feature of the park, was removed in 1940 to be melted down for the war effort. In addition to air raid protection, the park played a role in the Dig for Victory campaign, with aerial photography from 1946 showing the majority of the green space converted into allotments for food production. The land was not fully restored to grass until after the war.

Concerts are still held in the park during the summer months, but are now generally played near to, but not on, the actual band-stand site. The original gate piers remain at the Church Road entrance. The original lodge house at the main south-western gate has undergone significant alteration, with the façade being completely replaced over the years.

== Ecology ==
A specific zone along the southern boundary, known as the South Side Project, is managed as a nature trail and conservation area. This section is maintained to support native flora and foraging opportunities for the park's wildlife, including its population of Pipistrelle and Noctule bats.

=== Watercourse and lake ===
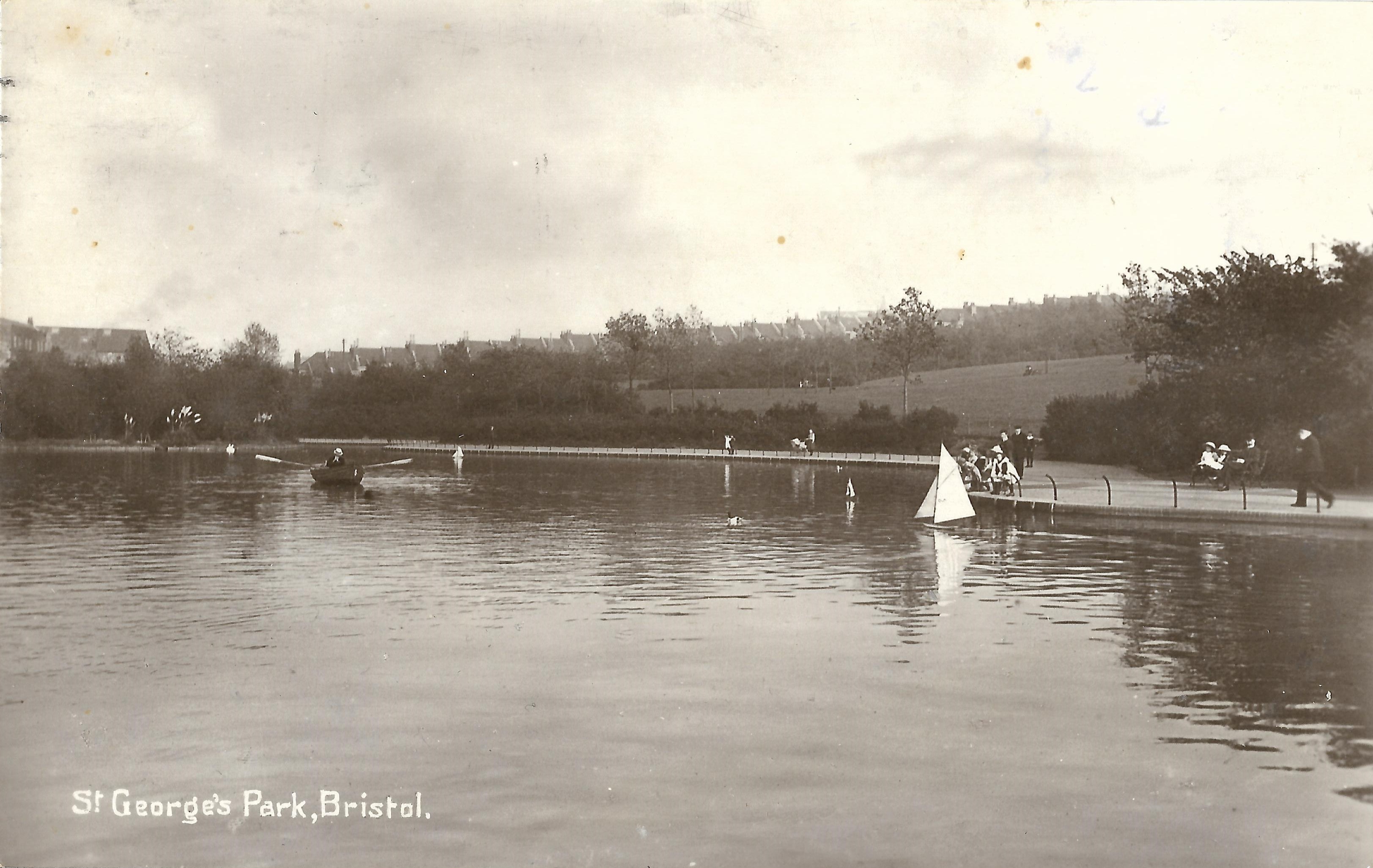
A photographic postcard showing boating in the lake, c. 1900

The park features a lake fed by the Wainbrook, a natural stream which used to flow through the east side of the park. It is situated within a natural bowl-shaped valley, originally formed by the path of the Wain Brook before it was dammed. Prior to the park's establishment, the brook supplied water to the engine of a scrap iron forge and rodding mill in Redfield. The lake's design was influenced by local model yachting enthusiasts. Upon its completion in 1895, the lake was specifically constructed with an oval shape and a central island positioned at the head of the water to leave a clear path for racing. At the time of opening, it was expected to host a club of over 100 members based on similar successful organisations in the Midlands.

The lake is brick-lined and was completed in late 1895 with dimensions of 120 by 60 feet (37 m × 18 m). While the water depth was originally intended to be 3 to 4 feet, by 1901 a safety report noted the edge depth was only 20 inches (51 cm) deep. As originally laid out, the water's edge was separated from the public by a knee-high iron post and wire fence.

The lake has historically suffered from ecological imbalances caused by overstocking. In July 1958, approximately 7,000 fish were transferred to the River Chew after overcrowding caused a parasitic infection that resulted in blindness in the majority of the larger roach. In June 1978, a crude sewage overflow killed thousands of fish and necessitated the draining of the water, with the RSPCA rescuing surviving birds.

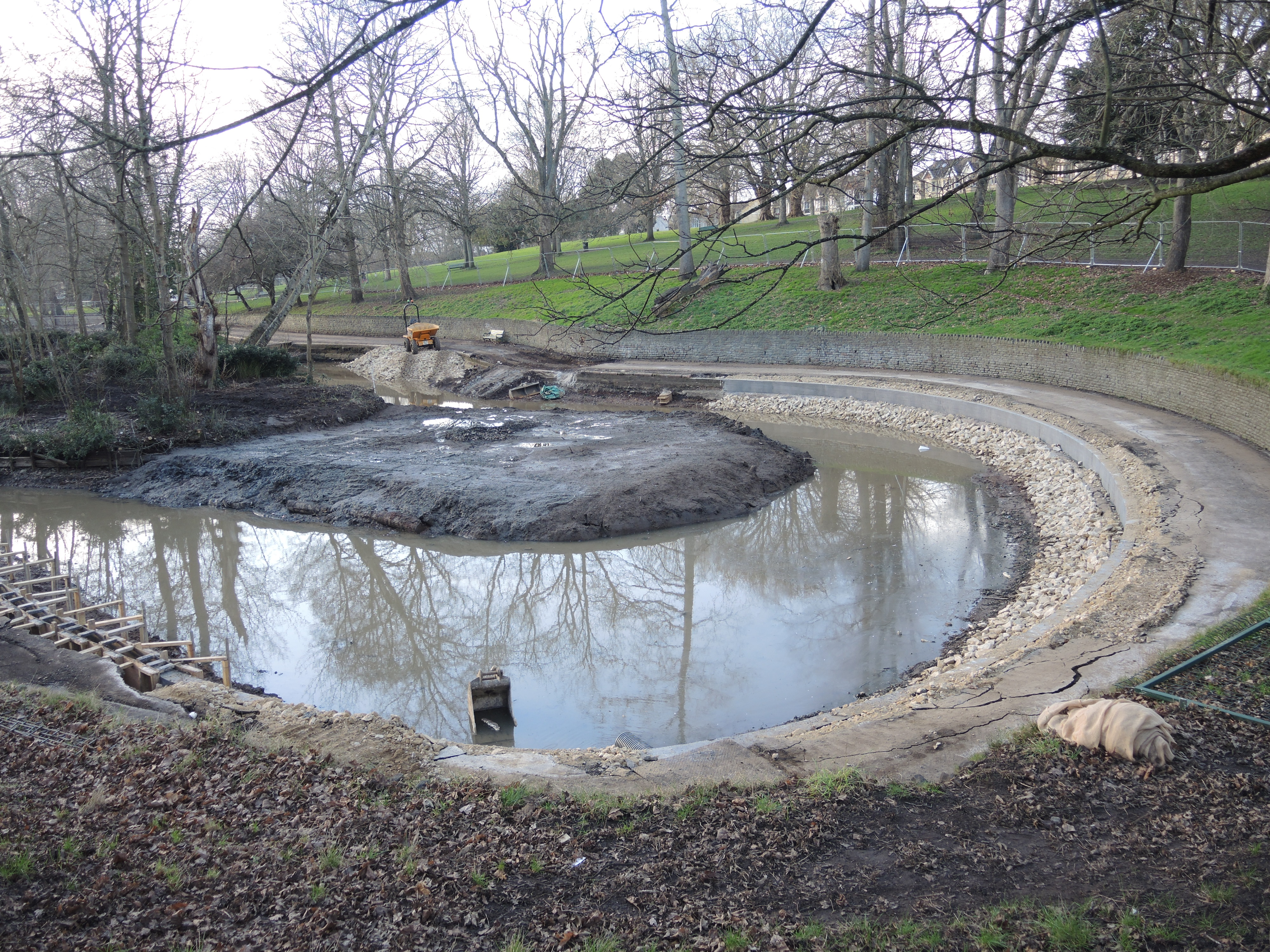
Dredging of the lake in 2022

The lake was historically one of only two in the city (the other being in Eastville Park) used for public boating, which ended in the mid-1980s. Fishing was permitted for many years, but by 2011, a report blamed the bait used by anglers for sustaining high fish populations, resulting in a total lack of aquatic vegetation. Furthermore, discarded fishing line frequently injured the park's swan population. Consequently, the St George Neighbourhood Partnership banned fishing. This was formalised via new park byelaws introduced by Bristol City Council in April 2017, which prohibited angling at St George Park specifically, while permitting it at other watercourses in the city. In December 2015, the council proposed a wholesale culling of the fish population using anaesthetic, as health checks indicated many were too unhealthy to be moved. However, following a petition which gathered over 3,500 signatures, the Angling Trust intervened in January 2016 to relocate healthy specimens. The lake was subsequently drained and desilted.

In 2018, the Friends of St George Park secured a National Lottery grant to commission the Wildfowl & Wetlands Trust (WWT) to create a comprehensive regeneration plan for the lake. The project was underpinned by an initial assessment conducted by WWT Consulting in 2011, which highlighted that the lake's poor ecological status was a result of its Victorian design, specifically the vertical stone edges and uniform depth, and high nutrient loading from wildfowl feeding and angling bait. To resolve these issues, the consultants recommended dredging the lake and installing gabions along the edges of the lake. These were designed to support native wetland flora such as Phragmites australis and Lythrum salicaria, thereby introducing a new habitat for invertebrates that the area lacked before.

The resulting design concepts aimed to implement these recommendations, proposing the creation of new reed beds, a second nesting island for birds, and a pond-dipping platform for educational use. Initial visualisations, created with the involvement of designer Beth Môrafon, featured a wooden walkway bridge crossing the centre of the water to allow visitors to view the wildlife sanctuary areas. However, following heritage reviews in 2020, the proposed bridge removed from the final scheme to protect the open aspect of the Victorian landscape, with the project thereafter refocusing primarily on environmental improvements rather than a wholesale remodelling of the park.

=== Flora ===
The park contains over 800 trees, many of which are mature. The site is dominated by London planes, though it also features hybrid limes, silver birch, and ash trees. Notable individual specimens include a holm oak and a probable red oak. Botanical surveys in 2015 categorised the grassland as semi-improved, dominated by perennial rye-grass but supporting colonies of the nationally uncommon corky-fruited water-dropwort. The park has also managed outbreaks of invasive Japanese knotweed. In 2024, additional planting in the park included a community orchard established through the council's One Tree Per Child programme.

=== Fauna ===
The park supports populations of noctule and pipistrelle bats which use the lake as a feeding area, preying on moths and beetles sustained by the mature tree canopy. Bird life in the park includes common water fowl such as swans, ducks and moorhens. Reporting by the Bristol Naturalists' Society has recorded substantial wintering wildfowl use of the lake since at least the mid-20th century. Surveys have also recorded species on the BTO's UK red list, including house sparrows, starlings, and spotted flycatchers. In January 2016 a ring-necked parakeet was recorded in the park. A site visit by consultants of the WWT in 2011 recorded a breeding pair of mute swans with cygnets on the lake, alongside mallard, coot and moorhen, and noted that the waterbody also attracted species such as black-headed gull (in winter) and occasional visitors including grey heron, cormorant, Canada goose and kingfisher.

== Facilities ==
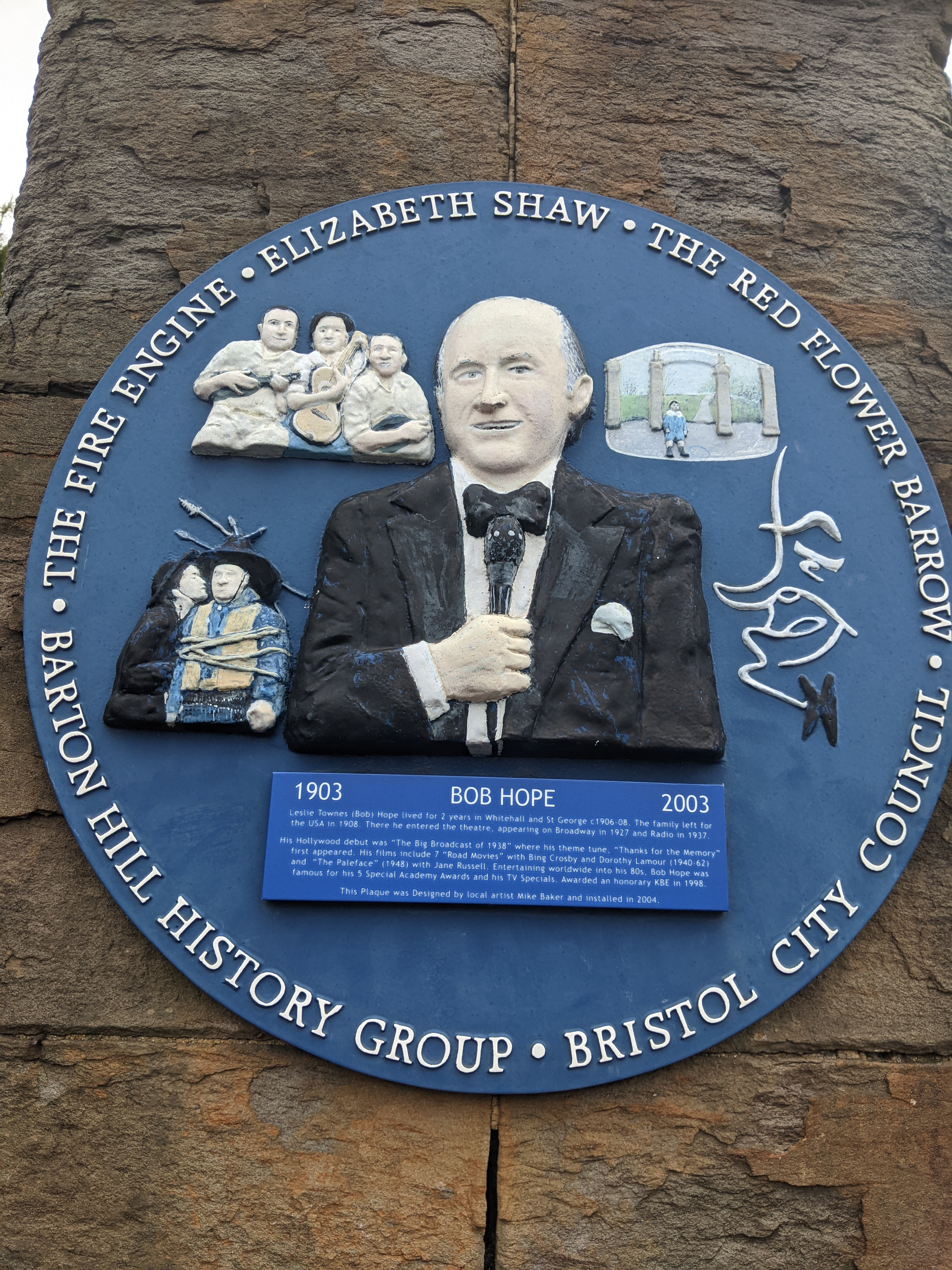
Plaque of Bob Hope by Mike Baker, 2004

The principal entrance on Church Road retains historic boundary features, including piers, gates and railings associated with the former St George’s Public Library site, which are Grade II listed.

The park includes a seasonal café kiosk, named The Bake Box, with an outdoor seating area. It serves baked goods and refreshments, and notes that it has received a gold standard Bristol Eating Better Award for its locally sourced, sustainable produce.

The park contains a large concrete skatepark designed for use by skateboarders, scooter riders, and BMX bikers. It is designed to serve as a hub for teenagers from the wider eastern area of the city.

=== Playground ===
The children's play area, known as the John Deasy Play Area, was modernised in 2009. It features a large structure modelled on a lizard head with climbing ribs and tunnel slides. In 2022, a local campaign group named Play in St George Park was formed to advocate for further upgrades, citing the need to replace aging equipment. The group successfully raised £130,000 for an initial phase of renovation, which included landscaping and new equipment for younger children.

In November 2025, Bristol City Council approved funding to deliver a second phase of the playground upgrades to address a lack of equipment suitable for older children and those with accessibility needs. This phase aims to transform the site from a neighbourhood facility into a "destination park".

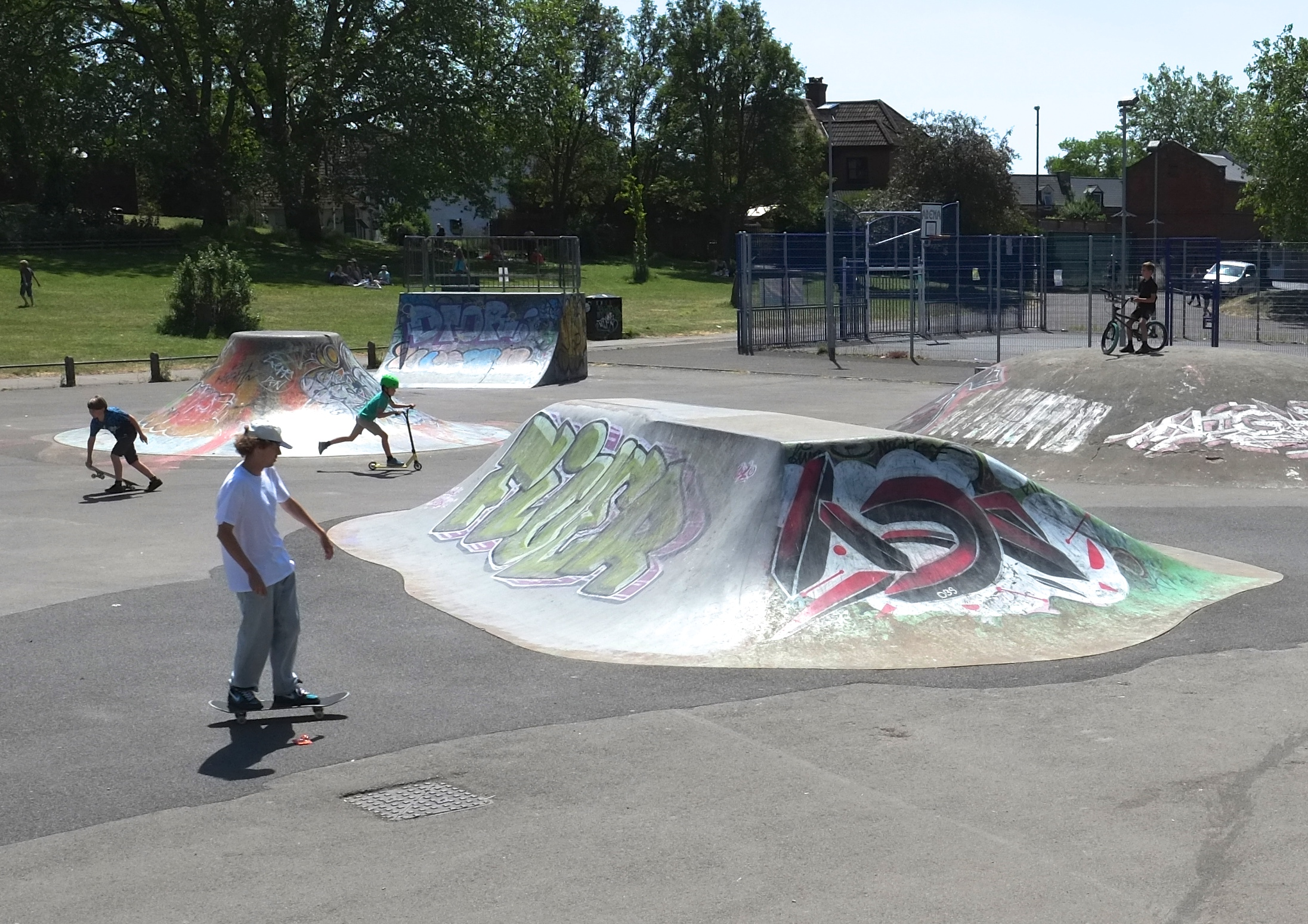
The skatepark in 2020

=== Sports ===
Two tennis courts and bowling greens are available for hire. In 2010, proposals were made for maintaining five tennis courts, with an option to light two of them for all-year-round use, and retaining a single bowling green. Proposals also included replacing and renewing the pavilion and changing rooms with a facility that retained historic features and added a cafe and public toilets.

The park contains a skatepark featuring ramps, jumps, a vert wall, and other features. The skatepark was built in the early 21st century and made of mainly concrete. In 2010, the facility was described as the largest skate park in the city. By 2025, local skaters and council reports described the skatepark as being in "poor condition" and partially unsafe. Subsequently, a £680,000 investment from the Community Infrastructure Levy (CIL) was granted to redevelop the skatepark into a destination facility and complete the playground upgrades, with work expected to take place between 2026 and 2028.

=== Memorials ===
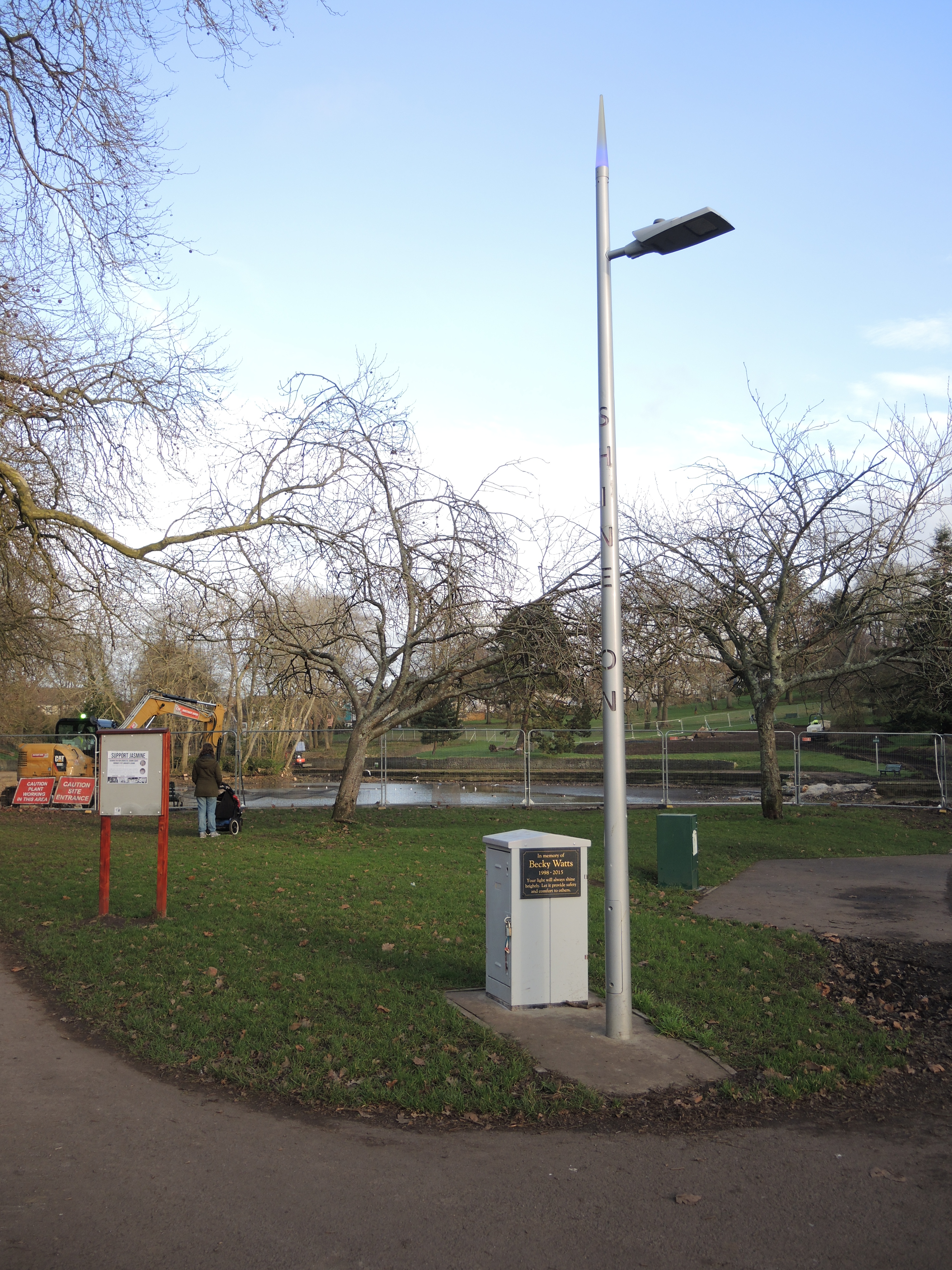
The Becky Watts memorial in the park

A blue plaque located at the entrance gate piers commemorates entertainer Bob Hope, who lived in the Whitehall and St George area as a child. It was unveiled in July 2004, shortly after Hope's death, with comedian Eddie Large among those taking part in the ceremony.

The park also contains a memorial to Bristol teenager Becky Watts, was killed in February 2015. A public balloon release in her memory was held in the park in March 2015, close to where she was last seen alive. The memorial consists of a lamp post and a plaque on its associated electrical cabinet.

=== Redfest ===
The park is the venue of Redfest, a volunteer-run community arts and music festival that has been described as a long-running showcase for local performers and organisations. It is a free event that has been running since 2008, and consists of live music with associated stalls with food and drink vendors.

== See also ==
- Parks of Bristol
