= Andrena integra =

Scientific classification
- Domain: Eukaryota
- Kingdom: Animalia
- Phylum: Arthropoda
- Class: Insecta
- Order: Hymenoptera
- Family: Andrenidae
- Genus: Andrena
- Species: A. integra

Binomial name
- Andrena integra Smith, 1853

Species of bee

Andrena integra is a species of miner bee in the family Andrenidae. It is found in North America.
