= Whitehall, Bristol =

Area of Bristol, England

Coordinates: 51.462°N 2.554°W

Whitehall
- Location within Bristol
- OS grid reference: ST615745
- Unitary authority: Bristol
- Region: South West
- Country: England
- Sovereign state: United Kingdom
- Post town: BRISTOL
- Postcode district: BS
- Dialling code: 0117
- Police: Avon and Somerset
- Fire: Avon
- Ambulance: South Western
- UK Parliament: Bristol East

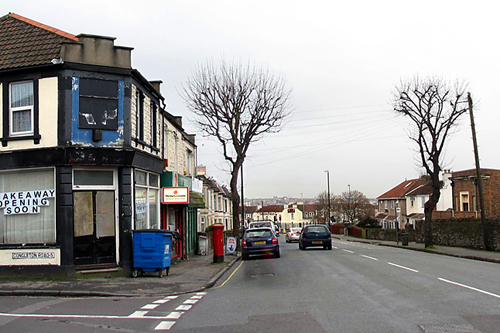
Whitehall Road

Whitehall is a predominantly residential neighbourhood in the east of Bristol, England. It is an informally defined area centred on Whitehall Road and bordering the neighbourhoods of Crofts End to the north, Speedwell to the east, St George to the south, and Easton and Greenbank to the west.

For administrative purposes, it is divided between the Bristol City Council wards of Easton, Eastville and St George West.

== Parks ==
The local green space is Whitehall Playing Fields, or Packer's Ground as it was known, taking its name from the local chocolate factory – Packers. In 2006 the company, known as Elizabeth Shaw, announced the closure of the factory site. In 2014 there were plans to convert it into housing. The playing field is to be fully redeveloped for sports use for The City Academy Bristol school.

== Housing ==
In part of the area, adjoining Easton and Eastville, there are still many streets and houses from the Victorian and Edwardian eras and in the part, adjoining St George, Bristol is the Gordon Estate with houses that were built in 1936. This area originally consisted of market gardens and the new estate was built on the rhubarb patch and as a result, rhubarb was quite commonplace in many gardens.

Some houses ("villas") overlook the adjoining St. George Park and these have small balconies.

Newer houses have since been built on the former Co-op Bakery and Rose Green High School sites. There is a plaque on the original school wall, which was retained, giving some history, about John Wesley having preached on this site.

The comedian Bob Hope lived for a time in Whitehall Road in his youth.

== Churches ==
Local Churches include Crofts End Church, established in 1895 by George Brown, as a Christian mission for miner's children it became known as 'The Miner's Mission' or Crofts End Mission. Still part of the local community and very much a family church its current Pastor is Andrew Yelland.

The Parish Church of St Ambrose has undergone some change in latter years, with its vicarage being demolished and replaced by a sheltered housing scheme for older people. The church hall was refurbished as part of this and is now The Beehive Centre with day-care facilities. The Almshouses were retained and are still in use.

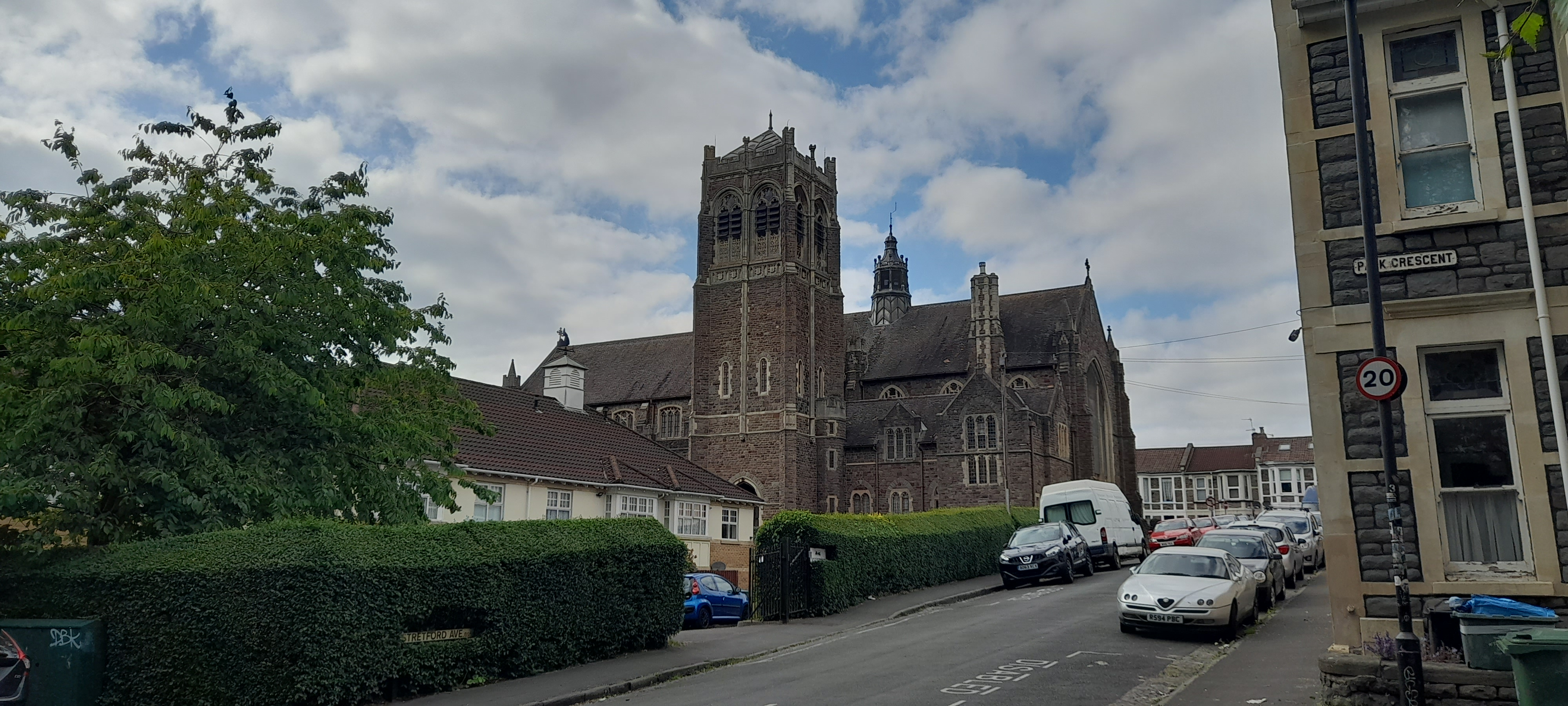
Church of St Ambrose

Whitehall Chapel has been retained and restored, but no longer for church purposes. It is now in use as offices. The 48th Bristol Scout Group Headquarters adjacent to the site of an old garage was originally sited on the new housing site. When the garage was originally redeveloped and enlarged, the garage company paid for the Scout Group to have a new building built. The Saint Leonard's Scout Group merged with the 48th Bristol Scout Group and they then became the 32nd Bristol (1st Whitehall) Scout Group. The patron saint of Scouting is Saint George also, the name of an adjacent local district.
