= List of churches in Bristol =

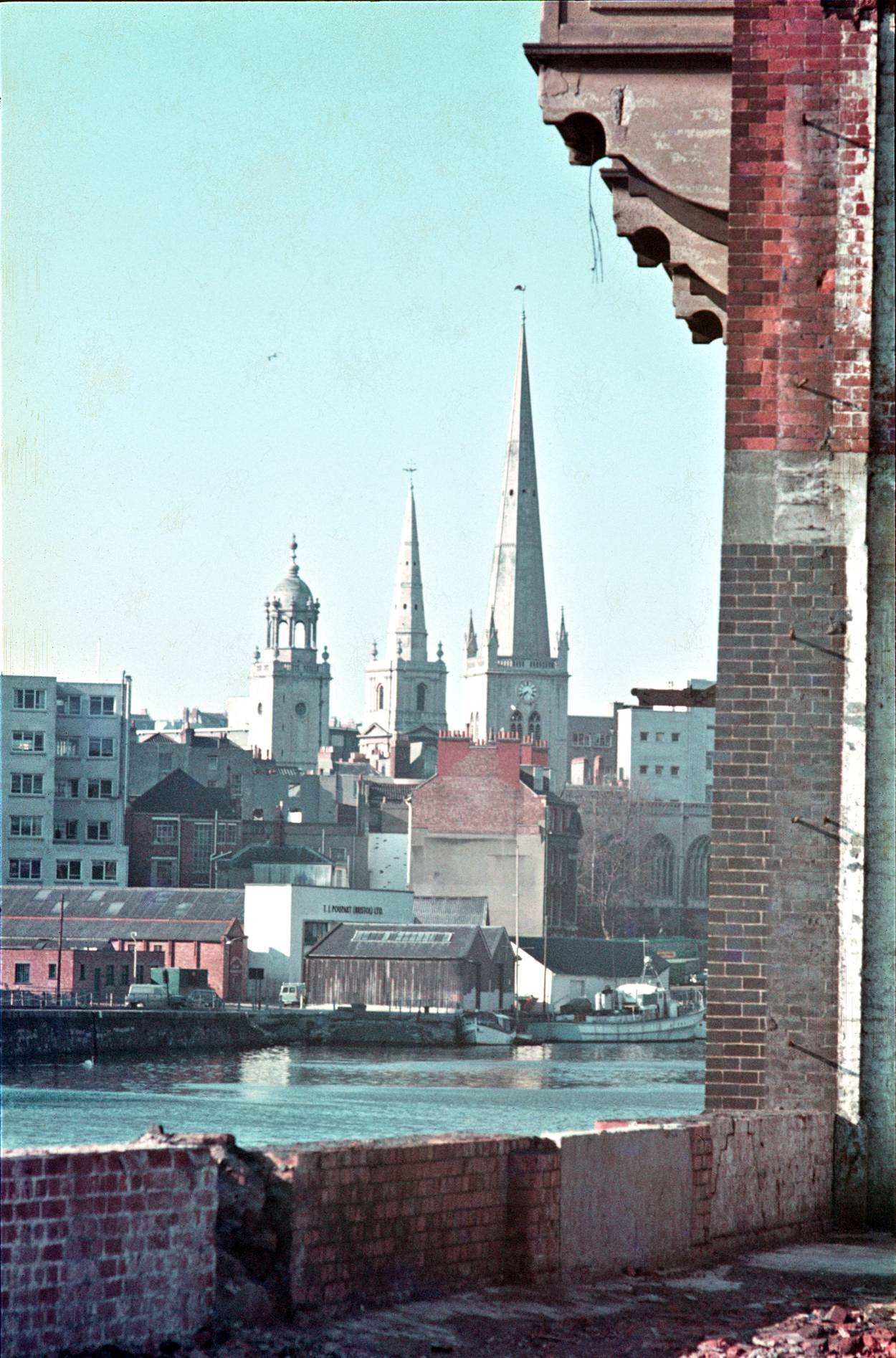
Left to right: All Saints, Christ Church with St Ewen, and St Nicholas Church in March 1969

The English city of Bristol has a number of churches.

Bristol has lost, rebuilt or demolished all of its strongly characteristic late medieval parish churches - the naves had no clerestories, any added aisles and chapels were separately gabled, all in simple Perpendicular style. These include the church of St Thomas the Martyr, St Nicholas church, Christ Church with St Ewen, St Werburgh's church, Temple church, St Peter's church, St Mary le Port church and the church of St Augustine the Less. The church of St Philip and St Jacob gives an idea of the Bristol style, but with much alteration.

There is also a list of former churches in Bristol.

The churches listed are Anglican except when otherwise noted.

Name of Church	Alternative Name(s)	Built	Location	Notes	Grade if listed building	Reference	Photo
St. Augustine's Church		1970s	Whitchurch	Closed at midday on 28 November 2007.			
All Saints, Bristol		12th century		A mediaeval church mainly rebuilt in the 18th century. Currently (2006) a Diocesan Education Centre.	II*	"Church of All Saints". historicengland.org.uk.	
Polish Church of Our Lady of Ostrobrama	Arley Chapel	1855	Arley Hill Road, Cotham	Polish Roman Catholic	II	"Arley Chapel". historicengland.org.uk.	
Bishopston Methodist Church							
Bristol Cathedral	Cathedral Church of the Holy and Undivided Trinity	1140	College Square, off Anchor Road.		I	"Cathedral Church of St Augustine, including Chapter House and cloisters". historicengland.org.uk.	
Bristol Community Church	Bristol New Covenant Church		Waters Road, Kingswood				
Buckingham Baptist Chapel		1842	Queen's Road, Clifton	by Richard Shackleton Pope	II*	"Buckingham Baptist Chapel". historicengland.org.uk.	
Carmel Christian Centre	Carmel		Bath Road, Brislington	Non-denominational			
Chapel of the Three Kings of Cologne		1504	Colston Street		II*	"Chapel of the Three Kings of Cologne". historicengland.org.uk.	
Christ Church with St Ewen		1786–1791	Clare Street, City of Bristol.	by William Paty	II*	"Christ Church with St Ewen". historicengland.org.uk.	
Christ Church, Clifton Down		1841	Clifton Down		II*	"Christ Church". historicengland.org.uk.	
Church of All Hallows		1899	Easton		II	"Church of All Hallows". historicengland.org.uk.	
Church of St John the Baptist, Bristol	St John on the Wall	14th century	City	Includes St John's Gate. The church is in a striking position over one of the old city gates. Founded before 1174, the present church is Perpendicular from the period 1350–1500. A conduit has supplied water from Brandon Hill since 1374	I	"Church of St John the Baptist and St John's Gate". historicengland.org.uk.	
Church of the Holy Trinity with St Edmund	Horfield parish church	15th century	Horfield		II*	"Church of the Holy Trinity with St Edmund". historicengland.org.uk.	
Church of Holy Trinity, Hotwells		1829	Hotwells	By CR Cockerell	II*	"Church of Holy Trinity". historicengland.org.uk.	
Church of Holy Trinity, Stapleton	Stapleton Parish Church	1857	Stapleton, Bristol		II*	"Church of Holy Trinity". historicengland.org.uk.	
City Road Baptist Church	Baptist	1862	Stokes Croft	By James Medland and A.W. Maberly	II	"City Road Baptist Chapel". historicengland.org.uk.	
Clifton Cathedral	Roman Catholic cathedral church of St Peter and Paul	1970-73	Clifton				
Cotham Church	Highbury Congregational chapel	1842-3	Cotham		II*	"Cotham Church". historicengland.org.uk.	
Counterslip Baptist Church		1957	Whitchurch				
Crofts End Church		1895	St George				
Crossnet			Redland			"Crossnet Bristol" https://www.crossnet.org.uk/ Retrieved 17 October 2019	
Eastern Orthodox Church of the Nativity of the Mother of God		1888	Clifton	Home to the oldest Orthodox community in Bristol providing services in English, Russian and Romanian.			
Ebenezer Church		1930s	Filton Avenue, Horfield				
Emanuel Court		1869	Clifton	Church tower, now flats.	II	"Emanuel Court". historicengland.org.uk.	
faithSPACE	Southville Methodist Church						
Glenside Museum		1861	Fishponds	Previously hospital chapel	II	"Glenside Hospital Chapel". historicengland.org.uk.	
Holy Trinity Church, Westbury on Trym		1194	Church Road in Westbury on Trym		I	"Church of the Holy Trinity". historicengland.org.uk.	
Holy Trinity Church, Kingswood		1819-21	Kingswood, South Gloucestershire		II*	"Holy Trinity Church". historicengland.org.uk.	
Holy Trinity Church, Lawrence Hill (St Philips)	Trinity Centre	1829	Lawrence Hill	By Thomas Rickman and Henry Hutchinson. Deconsecrated.	II*	"Holy Trinity Church". historicengland.org.uk.	
Hope Chapel, Hotwells, Bristol		1787	Hotwells				
Ivy Pentecostal Church	Ivy Church	c.1791 (chapel)	Montpelier	Assemblies of God congregation. Building originally the chapel of the Asylum for Poor Orphan Girls (chapel built c.1791); later Salvation Army premises and now Ivy Pentecostal Church.		"Ivy Church Bristol".	
Kensington Baptist Church	Kensington Baptist Chapel; Kensington Tabernacle	1888	Easton	Independent Baptist church designed by Thomas Lennox Watson. The congregation moved here from Thrissell Street Chapel.	II	"Kensington Baptist Chapel". Historic England.	
Life Community Church Bristol	Life Church Bristol or 48 Forest Road		Fishponds	In 2023, Life Church Bristol moved to Avanti Gardens School and The Vassall Centre. The church is now called Christ Faith Tabernacle (CFT) Church.			
New Covenant Church Bristol			Lawrence Hill, Bristol				
New Life Church Bristol			Meeting at Frenchay Village Hall, Frenchay				
New Room, Bristol	John Wesley's Chapel	1739	Broadmead	By John Wesley	I	"The New Room". historicengland.org.uk.	
Oasis Church South Bristol		2011	Hengrove	Part of Oasis John Williams and Oasis Trust. http://www.oasisacademyjohnwilliams.org/			
Parkway Methodist Church	Parkway Church	1972	St Werburgh's	Methodist church built to replace earlier local chapels (Brookland and Wesley) lost to motorway development. Architect Eustace H. Button.		"Parkway Methodist Church".	
Redland Parish Church		1740-43	Redland			"Redland Chapel". historicengland.org.uk.	
Severn Church, Bristol	Severn Vineyard Church	2009	The Station, Silver Street	Originally founded at the Bristol Grammar School www.severnvineyard.org			
Stapleton Road Congregational Chapel	The Congregational Centre	1871	Stapleton Road/Newton Street, Easton 51.4599°N 2.5756°W	Congregational chapel designed by Hans Price in an Italianate or Bristol Byzantine manner, with foundation stone laid 8 March 1871 and opened 20 October 1871. Part of the Congregational Federation.		"Congregational Chapel, Stapleton Road". Bristol Archives catalogue. Bristol City Council. Major, S. D. (1872). New Illustrated Handbook to Bristol, Clifton and Neighbourhood. Bristol: W. Mack. pp. 68–70 – via Archive.org.	
St Agnes Church	Church of St Agnes with St Simon	1885–1887 (consecrated 2 March 1886)	St Paul's		II	"Church of St Agnes with St Simon". historicengland.org.uk.	
St Aidan		1902	St George		II	"Church of St Aidan". historicengland.org.uk.	
St Alban, Redland	Church of St Alban	1907	Redland		II	"Church of St Alban". historicengland.org.uk.	
St Ambrose's Church	Church of St Ambrose with St Leonard	1912–1913	Stretford Road, Whitehall	Anglican parish church in a Free Gothic Revival style by W. V. and A. R. Gough.	II	"Church of St Ambrose". Historic England.	
St Andrew's Church, Clifton		1154 (first mention of old church), 1822 (new church)	Clifton	Old church demolished in 1820s, new church bombed and damaged during the Bristol Blitz and finally demolished in 1956		Bristol Record Office	
St Anne's Church, Greenbank	St Anne's, Eastville	1900–1901	Greenbank	Designed by George Oatley			
St Bonaventure's		1901	Bishopston	Roman Catholic			
St Ewen's, Old City	St David's Welsh Anglican church Feeder Road 1881 Arch J Bevan demolished 1923	1140 (demolished 1820)	Corn Street and Clare Street, Bristol	When the church was demolished in 1820, the congregation joined with Christ Church. The Old Council House (now the Register Office) was built on the site between 1824 and 1827.		St David's Welsh Anglican Church 1888 demolished 1923 ref. Y loegre sheets Cymru.	
St George, Brandon Hill		1821-3	Brandon Hill	Built by Robert Smirke	II*	"Church of St George, Brandon Hill". historicengland.org.uk.	
St James' Priory, Bristol		1129	City	The present church consists of part of the nave of a priory founded by Robert, 1st Earl of Gloucester no later than 1134. Currently (2006) the Roman Catholic church of the Little Brothers of Nazareth.	I	"Church of St James". historicengland.org.uk.	
St James' Presbyterian Church of England			Horsefair, City	Bombed and gutted 24 November 1940. Tower survives, but nave is offices immediately south of Bristol coach station.			
St John's Place	St John the Evangelist Church	1841	Clifton	now offices	II	"St John's Place". historicengland.org.uk.	
St John the Baptist		1834	Frenchay		II	"Church of St. John Baptist". historicengland.org.uk.	
St John the Baptist, Bedminster		1003 (earliest record of the Old Church), 1663 (17th-19th century church), 1855 (New Church)	Bedminster	Old church razed to the ground in 1645 by Prince Rupert of the Rhine during the English Civil War. 17th-19th century church demolished in 1854 to make way for the new church. New church damaged by incendiary bombs on 24 November 1940 during World War II.		Bristol Record Office	
Church of St Jude the Apostle with St Matthias-on-the-Weir		1849	Braggs Lane, Old Market, Bristol		II	"Church of St Jude the Apostle with St Matthias-on-the-Weir". historicengland.org.uk.	
St Luke's Church, Barton Hill		1840s	Queen Ann Road, Barton Hill		II	"Church of St Luke and attached side railings". historicengland.org.uk.	
St Luke's Church, Brislington		15th century	Church Hill, Brislington		II	"Church of St Luke". historicengland.org.uk.	
St Mark's Church, Bristol	Lord Mayor's Chapel	1230	College Green, Bristol	Originally the chapel of Gaunt's Hospital, a monastic foundation of 1220. The official Corporation church since 1722.	I	"Church of St Mark, Lord Mayor's Chapel". historicengland.org.uk.	
St Mary le Port		Pre 11th century	Castle Park	Ruins	II (Tower)	"Tower of Church of St Mary-le-Port". historicengland.org.uk.	
St Mary on the Quay		1839-43	Colston Avenue	Built in 1839 by R.S. Pope for the Irvingite congregation, Roman Catholic since 1843	II*	"Church of St Mary-on-the-Quay". historicengland.org.uk.	
St Mary Magdalene, Stoke Bishop		1860	Mariners Drive, Stoke Bishop		II	"Church of St Mary Magdalene". historicengland.org.uk.	
St Mary Redcliffe		late 12th century	Redcliffe Way		I	"Church of St Mary Redcliffe". historicengland.org.uk.	
St Mary, Fishponds		1821	Manor Road, Fishponds		II	"Church of St Mary". historicengland.org.uk.	
St Mary, Shirehampton		1929	High Street, Shirehampton		II	"Church of St Mary". historicengland.org.uk.	
St Mary the Virgin, Henbury		c1200	Church Close, Henbury		II*	"Church of St Mary the Virgin". historicengland.org.uk.	
St Matthews Church, Cotham		1833-35	Clare Rd Cotham	by Thomas Rickman	II	"Church of St Matthew". historicengland.org.uk.	
St Michael on the Mount Without	Church of St Michael		St Michael's Hill	Built in the 15th century. Disused.	II*	"Church of St Michael". historicengland.org.uk.	
St Nicholas, Bristol		1769	St Nicholas Street	The first church was founded before 1154, with a chancel extending over the south gate of the city. The gate and old church were demolished to make way for the rebuilding of Bristol Bridge and the church was rebuilt in 1762-9 by James Bridges (architect) and Thomas Paty, who rebuilt the spire. The interior was destroyed by bombing in 1940 and rebuilt 1974-5 as a church museum, used by the city council. Part of the old church and town wall survives in the 14th century crypt. The interior was restored and the church reopened in 2018 under the leadership of Rev'd Toby Flint.	II*	"Church of St Nicholas". stnicholasbristol.org.	
St Nicholas of Tolentino Church		1850	Lawford's Gate, Easton	Roman Catholic parish church founded in 1848 and built in stages (1850–1873) to designs by Charles Hansom. Reordered and extended 2006–2007.	Locally listed	"Bristol (Easton) – St Nicholas of Tolentino". Taking Stock: Catholic Churches of England & Wales. Catholic Bishops' Conference of England and Wales. The Bristol Local List (PDF) (Report) (5th ed.). Bristol City Council. September 2020. p. 21.	
St Oswald's church		1927	Cheddar Grove, Bedminster Down		II	"Church of St Oswald". historicengland.org.uk.	
St Paul's Church, Southville		1831	Coronation Road, Southville	NB only tower is listed building	II	"Tower of the Church of St Paul". historicengland.org.uk.	
St Paul's Church, Bristol		1790s	Portland Square, St Pauls		I	"Railings and gates of the Church of St Paul". historicengland.org.uk.	
St Peter's Church, Castle Park		12th century	Castle Park	A Saxon foundation, bombed in 1940. Ruined. Maintained as a monument to the civilian war dead of Bristol.		"Church of St Peter". historicengland.org.uk.	
St Peters Church, Bishopsworth		1842	Church Rd, Bishopsworth		II*	"Church of St Peter". historicengland.org.uk.	
St Peter and St Paul, Bristol	The Greek Church		Lower Ashley Road	Greek Orthodox			
St Philip and Jacob, Bristol		Before 1174	Narrow Plane	Commonly known as "Pip n Jay" since the 1960s and "Central Church" since 2018. Early C13 chancel, nave and lower tower, mid C15 N chancel aisle and upper tower, nave altered 1764, N and S stair turrets to the nave, N porches and refenestration of 1836; restored 1850 by William Armstrong.	II*	"Central Church Bristol". centralchurchbristol.org Retrieved 7 August 2024.	
St Stephen's Church, Bristol		1470	St Stephens Avenue		I	"Church of St Stephen". historicengland.org.uk.	
Seamen's Church & Institute	Seamen's Mission Church and Institute	1880	Prince Street and Royal Oak Avenue, Queen Square	The church was initially built in 1880 as a base for missionaries to spread the Gospel to ship crews. It became damaged during the Bristol Blitz in 1940, after which it became attached to the Seamen's Institute building on Prince Street. In 1987, both the church and institute closed.			
St Thomas the Martyr, Bristol		Founded before 1200	St Thomas Street	Rebuilt in Perpendicular style in the mediaeval period and again in 1789-93 by James Allen. Redundant.	II*	"Church of St Thomas including wall, gates and gateway". historicengland.org.uk.	
St Werburghs Church		1758	Mina Road, St Werburghs		II*	"Church of St Werburgh". historicengland.org.uk.	
Temple Church	(Holy Cross Church)	12th century	City	A round church was built by the Knights Templar in 1150 and rebuilt at the suppression of the order in 1312. Gutted by bombing in 1940. Ruined.	II*	"Temple Church". historicengland.org.uk.	
Victoria Methodist Church	Vic		Clifton				
Whitefield's Tabernacle, Kingswood		1741	Kingswood		I	"Whitfield's Tabernacle". historicengland.org.uk.	
Wick United Reformed Church		1800s	Wick, South Glos		II	"Wick URC". historicengland.org.uk.	
Woodlands Christian Centre	Woodies		Clifton				

== See also ==
- Buildings and architecture of Bristol
