= George Gould =

George Gould may refer to:

- George Gould (Baptist) (1818–1882), English minister
- George Gould (businessman) (1865–1941), New Zealand farmer, racehorse owner and racing administrator
- George D. Gould (1927–2022), American financier
- George Jay Gould (1864–1923), American financier, a son of Jay Gould
- George Jay Gould II (1896–1963), his son, American lawyer and oil company executive
- George M. Gould (1848–1922), American doctor and lexicographer
