= St Anne's Church, Greenbank =

Anglican church in Bristol, England

St Anne's Church
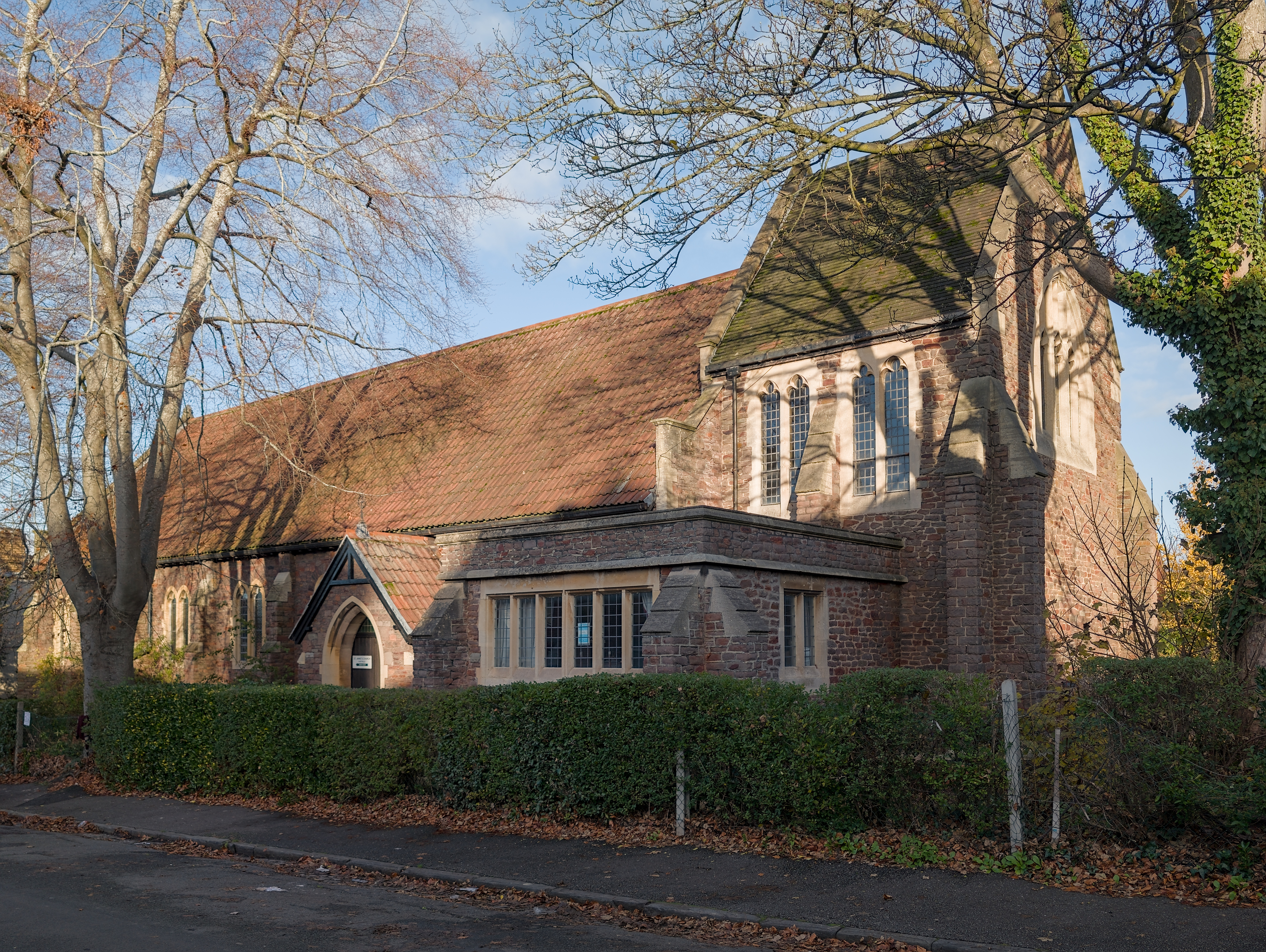
- St Anne's Church
- 51.468551°N 2.557006°W
- Location: St Leonard’s Road, Greenbank, Bristol, England
- Denomination: Church of England
- Website: https://www.stanneschurchbristol.org.uk/

History
- Status: Active
- Dedication: Saint Anne
- Dedicated: 1 June 1901
- Consecrated: 31 October 1913

Architecture
- Architect(s): George Oatley (1901); Percival Hartland Thomas (1926 conversion)
- Construction cost: £1,830 (1901)

Specifications
- Capacity: 550

St Anne's Church is a Church of England parish church in the Greenbank area of Bristol. Originally built as a temporary mission hall in the early 20th century to designs by George Oatley, the structure was later converted into a permanent church by P. Hartland Thomas. It now serves the united Parish of St Anne with St Mark and St Thomas, which has prompted the church to rebrand itself as St Anne's Eastville.

== History ==
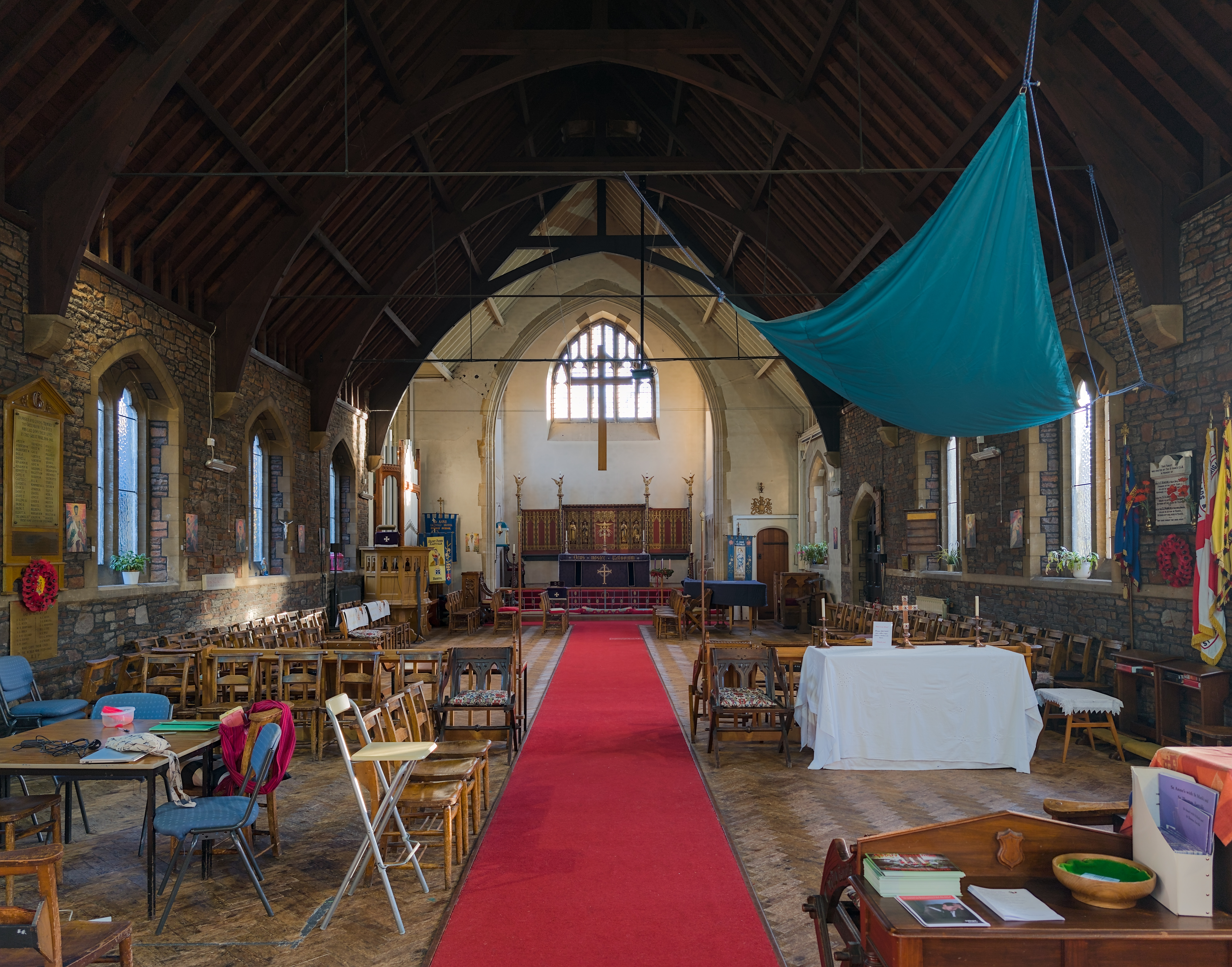
Interior, looking north-to-south

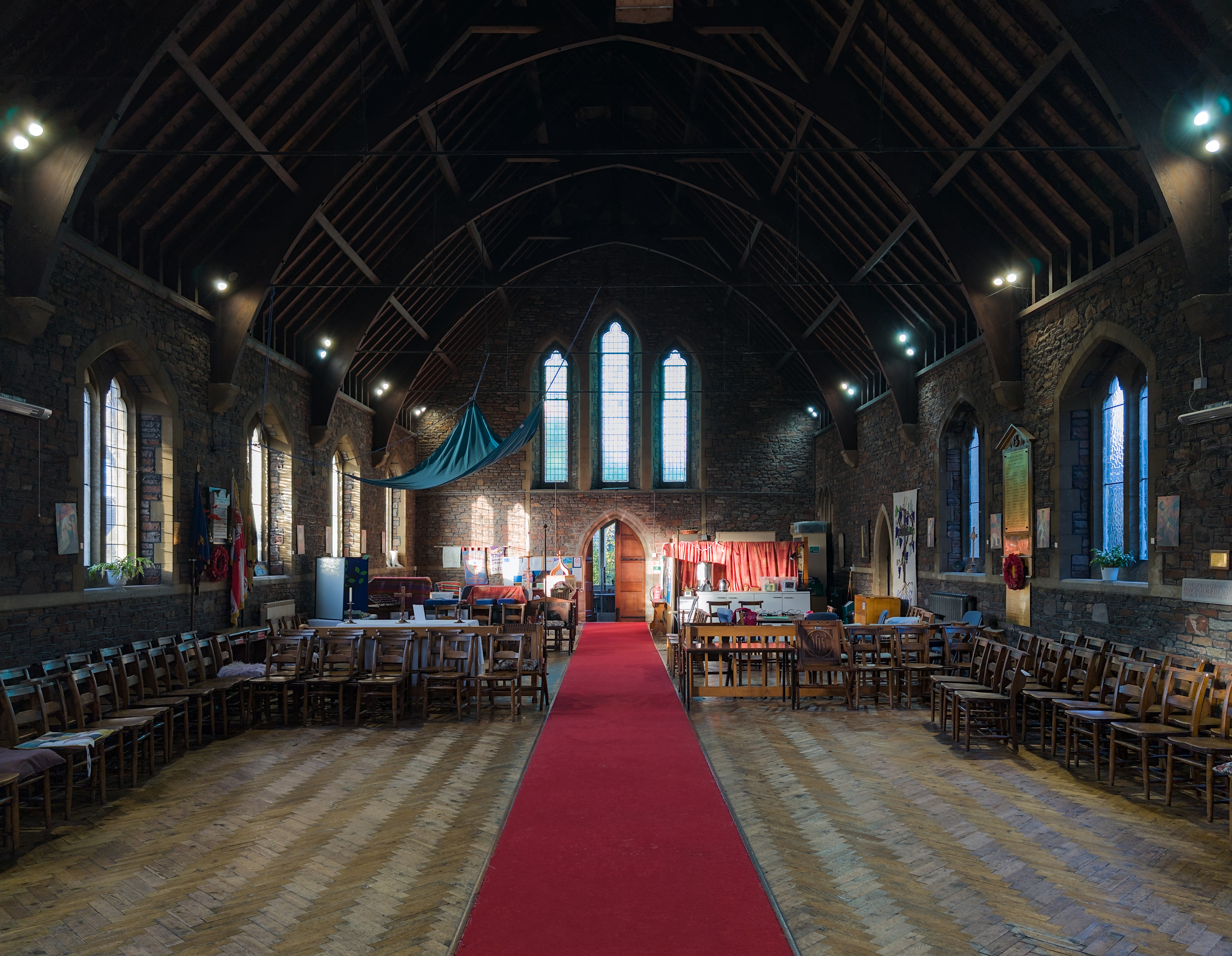
Interior, looking south-to-north

In the late 19th century, the Greenbank area transitioned from agricultural land to a dense residential district, prompting the Church Extension Commission under Bishop Ellicott to acquire a site for a new place of worship in 1889. The site for the church was secured through the Supplementary Commission, which successfully funded the acquisition of the sites for both St Anne's Church and St Katharine's Church, Bishopston, despite the commission's shortcomings in fundraising. The site, costing £800, was large enough to accommodate a future church, parsonage, and mission hall.

The present building was constructed between 1900 and 1901 to serve as the initial mission church of St Mark's Church, Easton. Designed by the architect George Oatley, the building was dedicated by the Bishop of Bristol on 1 June 1901. The construction was carried out by the builder G. Humphreys at a cost of approximately £1,800, with the Bishop's Commission providing a grant of £1,200 towards the work.

The 1901 structure was intended to be temporary, with Oatley producing designs for a permanent church to be built on the adjacent land fronting Greenbank Road. This never came to fruition and instead, facilities were expanded through the addition of a church room in 1908–1909. Also designed by Oatley, this extension cost £300 and was built to accommodate guilds and social classes.

Following the decision not to build the larger church, the mission hall was substantially remodelled to function as a permanent parish church. On 13 June 1926, St Anne's was consecrated as an independent parish. The same year a conversion was overseen by architect Percival Hartland Thomas, who reversed the orientation of the building's layout. The original west wall was removed and replaced by a high arch leading to a new sanctuary with a wagon roof.

The church survived a fire in an adjoining boiler house on 2 April 1949. The blaze destroyed the outbuilding's roof and equipment, but the main building sustained only minor damage due to the quick actions of a passing police officer. In the 1950s, St Anne's developed a close working relationship with the neighbouring Castle Green Congregational Church. Joint home visits were carried out by the new incumbents of both churches, the Rev E. C. Lake (St Anne's) and Rev L. E. Jenkins (Castle Green), and in 1957 a united faith healing mission was held across both venues by the evangelist Rev William Wood of London.

Architectural additions continued with a new western porch in 1966 and a link block connecting the church and hall in the 1980s. Following the closure of St Thomas's, Eastville (1976), and St Mark's, Easton (1982), the parishes were merged to form the current benefice.

=== Mar Thoma congregation ===
Between 2002 and 2017, the church building was shared with the St Thomas Mar Thoma Church, a congregation with origins in Kerala. The group held their first Holy Communion at St Anne's in August 2002. As the community grew, the arrangement was formalised in 2012 with a sharing agreement signed by the diocese. The Mar Thoma congregation would go on to purchase the former Southville Methodist Church in 2016, moving to these new premises the following year.

== Interior and fittings ==
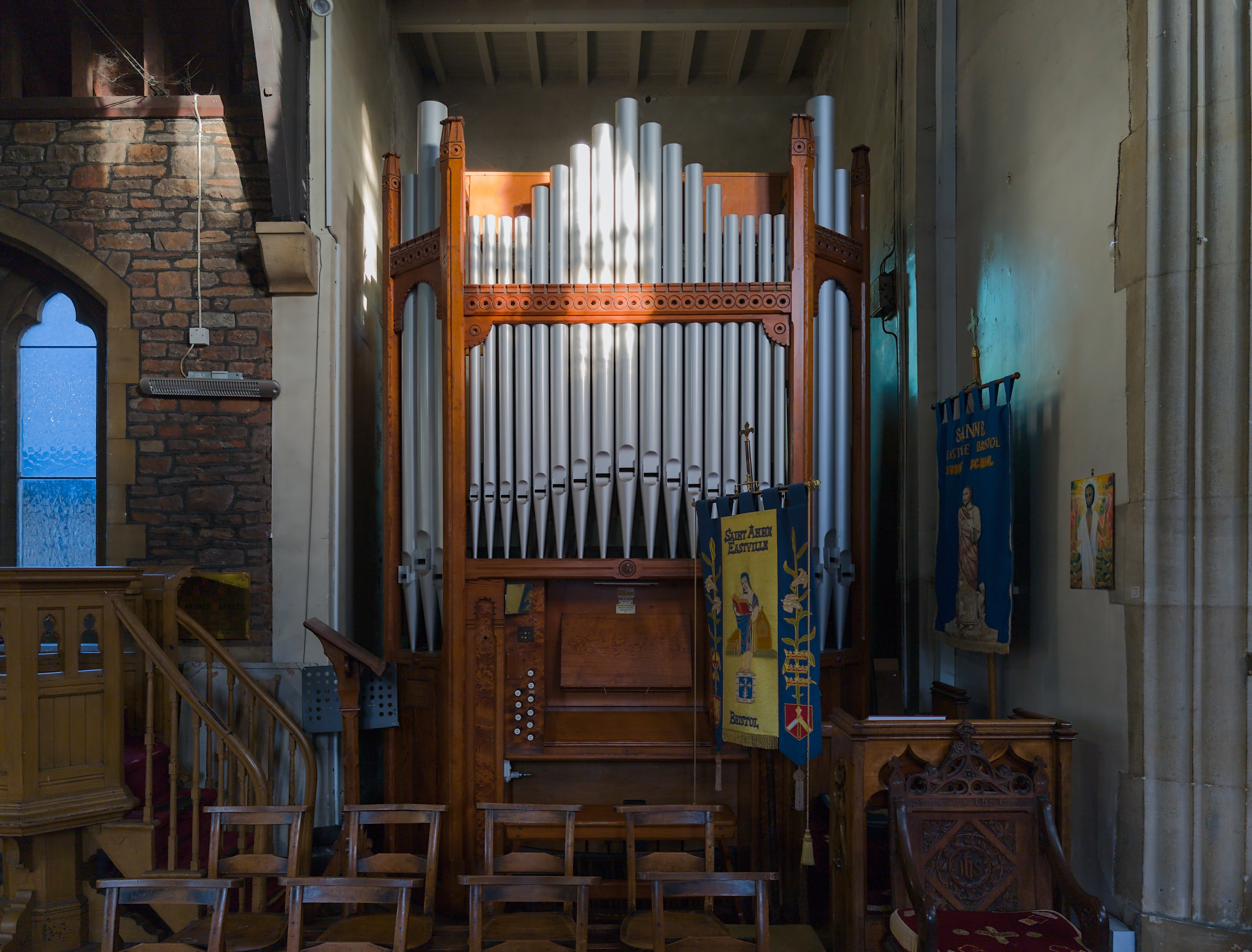
The organ, located in the south end of the nave

The building was designed in an Early Gothic Revival style, constructed of red Pennant stone with freestone dressings. The interior masonry was originally left pointed rather than plastered, with a varnished pine roof open to the ridge timber.

The church houses a collection of furnishings relocated from other Bristol churches. A reredos created by Charles Eamer Kempe was acquired from St Simon's Church in Baptist Mills, while the sanctuary features riddel posts designed by Ninian Comper, originally located in the chapel of St Matthias College. The church also possesses a sacrament house designed in the 1920s by Martin Travers that was previously at St Jude's Church. Additionally, the altar rails were dedicated in 1951 as a tribute to the Rev. B. Vaughan Parry.

The original organ was a two-manual instrument built by J.G. Haskins and Co. of Bristol. Dedicated on 17 January 1912 by the Rev. Canon Alford, it cost £260 to install. The instrument was specifically designed to be compact and movable, in anticipation of the larger church project that never materialised. It was later replaced with the W. G. Vowles organ, with casing, taken from the redundant St Mark's Church.

== See also ==
- Churches in Bristol
