= Crofts End Church =

- Crofts End Church
- 51.46707°N 2.54203°W
- Location: Bristol
- Country: England
- Denomination: Nonconformist

History
- Founded: 1895
- Founder: George Brown

Clergy
- Pastor: Andrew Yelland

Crofts End Church is a nonconformist church, located in St George, Bristol, England. The specific area in which it is located is known locally as Crofts End.

Formerly known as the Miner's Mission and Crofts End Mission, the church was established in 1895 by a young miner, George Brown, who felt called by God to start a Christian work for the many poor, ragged and barefoot children of the area. The church is now part of the Bristol City Mission Society, a registered charity.

The full history of the church can be found in a book titled Miner to Missionary published in 2015 for its 120th anniversary, written by Alan Freke. It includes memories of Crofts End and historical details of life of the founder.

The 1960s church building was due for demolition in early 2016, to be replaced with a new worship space and community hub.

The current pastor is Andrew Yelland.

== See also ==
- Churches in Bristol
