= Greenbank Masjid =

Mosque in Bristol, England

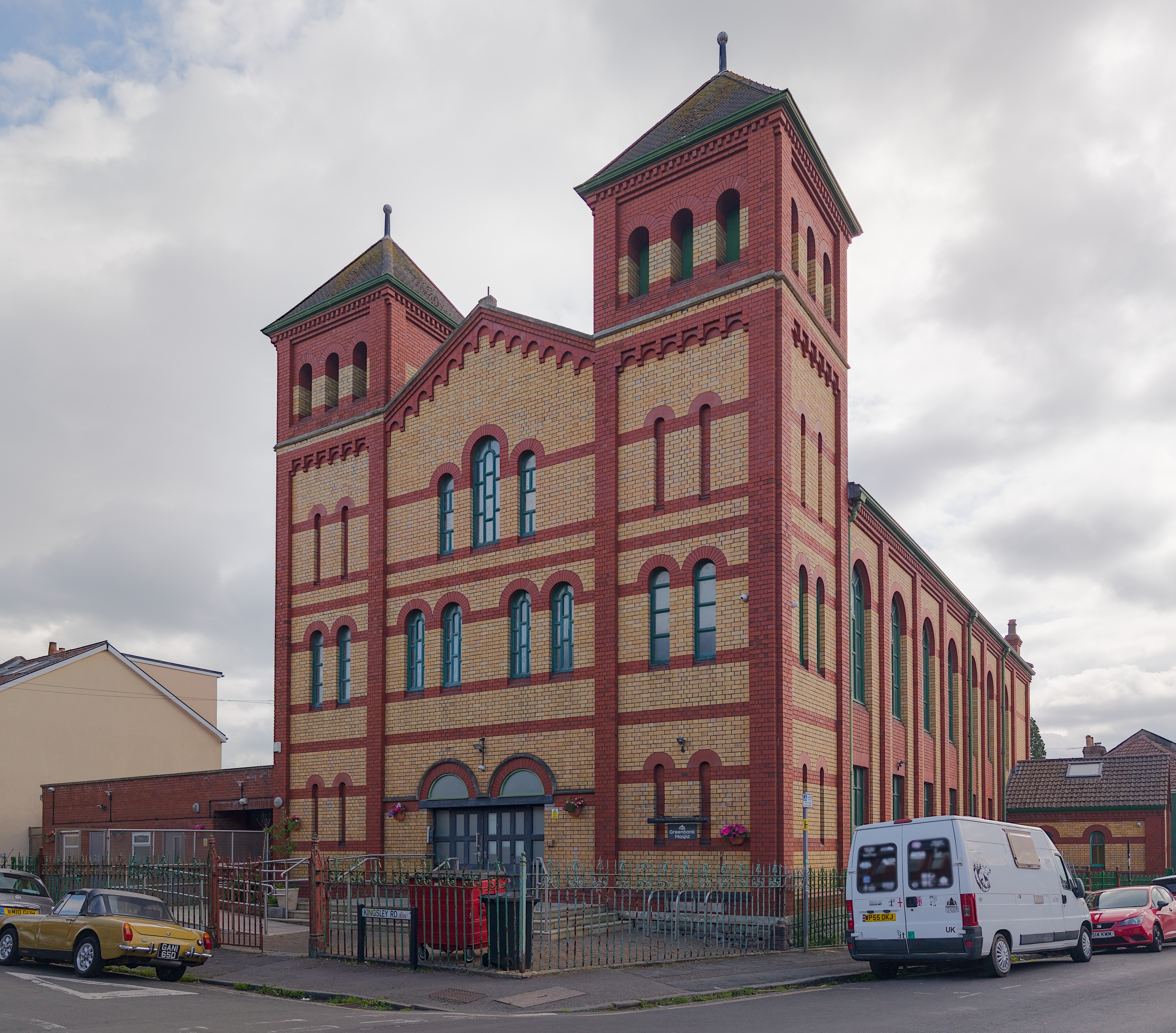

Religion
- Affiliation: Islam
- Branch/tradition: Sunni
- Ownership: Easton Islami Darasgah

Location
- Location: Greenbank Road & Kingsley Road, Easton, Bristol, BS5 6HE, United Kingdom
- Interactive map of Greenbank Masjid
- Coordinates: 51.467854°N 2.557760°W

Architecture
- Architect: Sir Frank Wills
- Style: Romanesque Revival
- Groundbreaking: 1 January 1902
- Completed: 1902

Specifications
- Capacity: 800 (original)
- Minaret: 0

Website
- greenbankbristol.org

Greenbank Masjid (officially Easton Islami Darasgah) is a Hanafi–Deobandi mosque on Greenbank Road in the Easton area of Bristol, England. It occupies the former Castle Green United Reformed Church, a 1902 church building designed by Bristol architect Sir Frank Wills. The polychrome brick landmark, nicknamed the "Lego church", replaced a much older chapel in what is now Castle Park. After the Christian congregation closed in 2008, the building was purchased and adapted for Muslim worship.

== History ==
=== Castle Green congregation (1630s–1900) ===
Religious dissenters connected with Bristol Castle were first noted in 1633, and by 1654 they met at the home of the governor, Colonel Adrian Scrope. John Thompson, appointed pastor in 1670, was jailed under the Conventicle Acts and died in Newgate Prison in 1675, becoming a local Non-conformist martyr. Successive chapels were erected near Queen Street, in Castle Green (rebuilt 1730 and 1782) and lastly in 1815.

By the 1890s the commercial quarter around Castle Green was in decline; the trustees agreed to sell the freehold chapel and schoolrooms in 1898. Proceeds and a £120 endowment were transferred, under Charity Commission approval, to fund a new church in the growing suburb of Greenbank.

=== Castle Green Church, Greenbank Road (1902–2008) ===
The foundation stone of the new Castle Green Congregational Church was laid on 1 January 1902 by Charles Hobhouse, M.P. Designed by Frank Wills and built by George Humphreys for about £5,000, the brick church seated 800 and included vestries and an attached school block.

A thriving Sunday school reached nearly 600 pupils and teachers by 1907. Ministers such as Revs George Adam and D. J. Roberts oversaw well-attended anniversaries of the congregation. A comedy performance by Harry Lauder at the church in 1913, which drew an audience of 1,200, was widely reported on by international newspapers.

In 1909, the church established a football team, Castle Green AFC, which competed in the Bristol Free Churches League. The team, known as The Congs, was largely staffed by members of the church's youth club and the 2nd Bristol Boys' Brigade company. The club disbanded and reformed several times throughout the 20th century before eventually moving to Mangotsfield with the church congregation.

After joining the United Reformed Church in 1972, attendance dwindled, with the final service taking place on 15 September 2008, and the marriage registration was formally cancelled in 2010. Prior to the building's sale in 2008, the congregation had dwindled to approximately 30 regular worshippers. At the time of closure, church elders anticipated that the main building would be converted into residential flats while the side halls would remain in community use, though the eventual sale to the Easton Islami Darasgah preserved the building for religious use. The congregation was merged with Mangotsfield United Reformed Church into the Mangotsfield and Castle Green United Reformed Church on 20 September 2008.

=== Greenbank Masjid (2008–present) ===
The building was bought by the Easton Islami Darasgah and reopened as Greenbank Masjid, serving Bristol's Muslim community.

A builder's time capsule containing newspapers, coins, and stamps from 1901, was unearthed during renovation and donated to M Shed. In January 2019, the mosque hosted the inaugural meeting of the country's first Mosque Independent Advisory Group (IAG). Attended by the Avon and Somerset Police and Crime Commissioner, the initiative was designed to establish a formal partnership between the police force and the local Muslim community to facilitate constructive challenges and support.

Following a hate crime incident involving threats at a mosque in nearby Fishponds in 2017, Greenbank Masjid increased its security measures, including the deployment of security guards. By 2024 the mosque reported 300 regular Friday worshippers, a 100-pupil madrassah and multiple welfare projects. A major refurbishment of the women's prayer hall began in 2024. Academic research has highlighted the mosque's efforts to include women in decision-making through the dedicated IAG.

== Architecture ==
Wills designed the former Castle Green Congregational Church in a polychromatic late-Romanesque Revival manner, prompted (as later summarised by Pevsner) by a wish to avoid both Gothic and "ugly barnlike plainness". It is a substantial polychrome-brick landmark, built in pale yellow brick articulated by broad red-brick bands and red dressings, with round arches used consistently for openings and panels. The west front is composed as a compact westwork, with a central gable between two short, square towers; their upper stages are opened by paired and tripled round-arched belfry lights, and each is finished with a low pyramidal roof. Gomme, Jenner, and Little compare the effect, with the clasping towers and open belfry arches, to a German westwork in character.

The elevations are organised in clear horizontal stages, the red bands reading as string courses, with tiers of narrow, round-headed windows grouped in pairs and threes; the long side wall is rhythmically punctuated by tall arched openings of similar section. Contemporary reporting at the stone-laying noted a principal entrance from (then) King Street, and described an interior intended to hold about 800, with a gallery carried "all round" and the usual vestries and offices; a school block was also provided with the scheme. The distinctive banded brickwork and massing has long attracted the local nickname "Lego church".

== See also ==
- List of mosques in the United Kingdom
- St Anne's Church, Greenbank, an adjacent Anglican parish church
