= Bristol Community Church =

Church in Bristol, England

Coordinates: 51.4629733°N 2.5153053°W

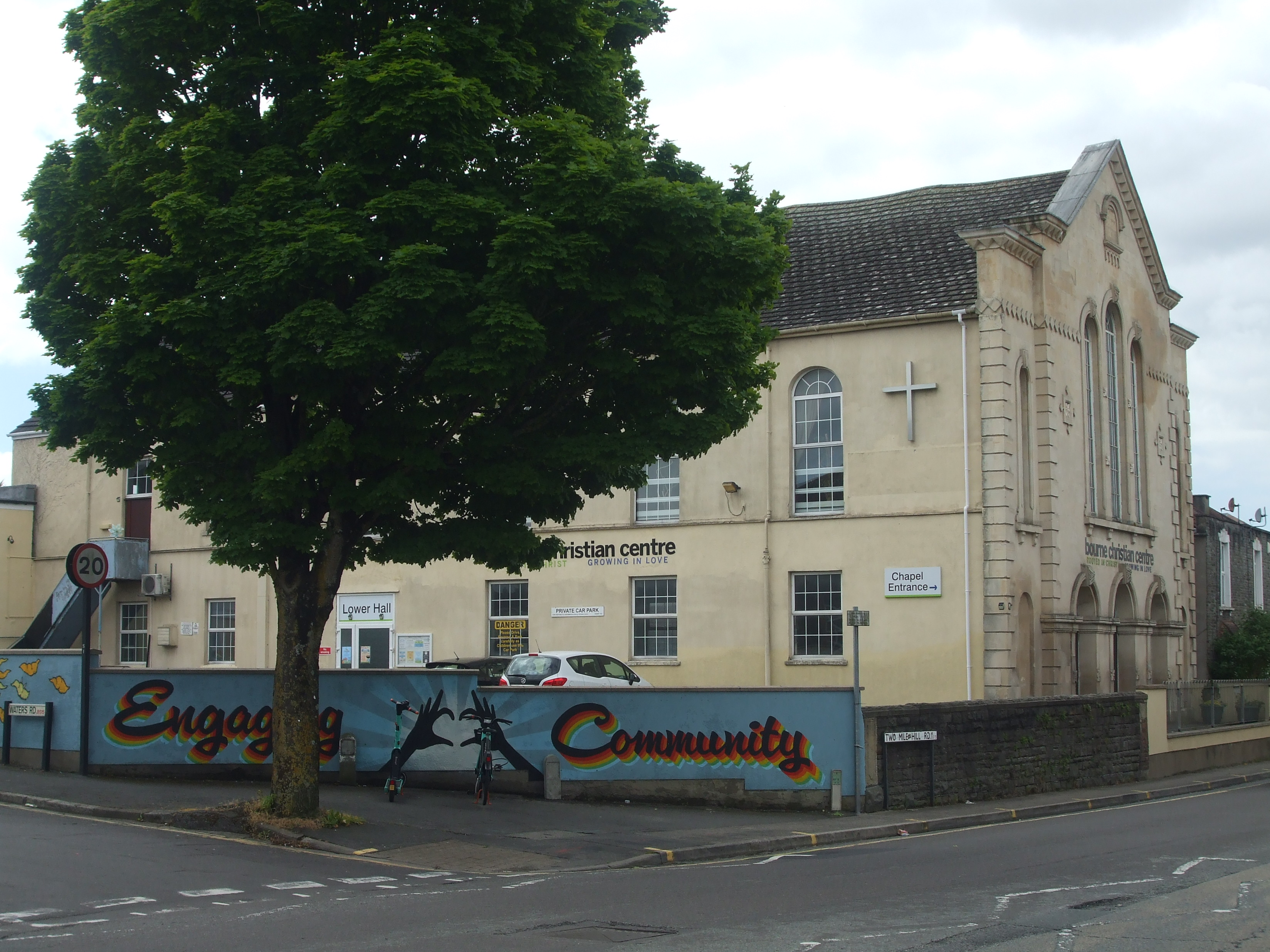
- Bourne Chapel in May 2024
- Formation: 1984
- Location: Kingswood, Bristol
- Official language: English

Bristol Community Church (formerly the Bristol New Covenant Church) is a charismatic church located in Kingswood, Bristol, England.

== History ==
The Bristol New Covenant Church was set up in 1984 by Dave Jones, a pastor from Bath; before its foundation some people from the area would travel to Bath City Church. The name was changed to Bristol Community Church in the 1990s because the word "covenant" in its name appeared to be leading people to believe that the church was a cult.

The church met at a number of different venues around the city before moving to its current home, Bourne Chapel in Two Mile Hill Road, Kingswood, a former Primitive Methodist building erected in 1873, which had previously been part of an underwear factory.

Bristol Community Church split in 2012 following the conviction of one its youth leaders for child sexual offenses. The remaining church changed its name to Bourne Christian Centre.

== See also ==
- Churches in Bristol
