= George Gould (Baptist) =

English Baptist minister

- Born: 20 September 1818; Castle Green, Bristol, England
- Died: 13 February 1882 (aged 63); Norwich, Norfolk, England
- Occupation: Baptist minister

George Gould (1818–1882) was an English Baptist minister.

== Life ==
The eldest son, by a second marriage, of George Gould, a Bristol tradesman, he was born at Castle Green on 20 September 1818. After passing through (1826–32) a severe boarding school, he became clerk to a wine merchant at the end of 1832, and in 1836 was articled to an accountant.

After illness in the winter of 1836–7, Gould thought of taking orders in the Church of England, but decided he could not conscientiously subscribe the 39 Articles. His father was a Baptist deacon, and he was baptised at Counterslip Chapel on 5 November 1837. On the following 24 December he preached his first sermon at Fishponds and became a student of the Bristol Baptist College in September 1838. In 1841 he was chosen pastor of a small Baptist congregation in Lower Abbey Street, Dublin. He moved in 1846 to South Street Chapel, Exeter.

On 29 July 1849 Gould became pastorate at St. Mary's Chapel, Norwich, in succession to William Brock. In 1857 his church was divided on the question of admitting the non-baptised to communion; a secession followed, and a bill in chancery (May 1858) was filed by a trustee, the Rev. William Norton of Egham Hill, Surrey. The Master of the Rolls gave judgment (28 May 1860) in favour of Gould and the majority of his church, who had advocated open communion. In 1868 new school-rooms and a lecture-room were required at St. Mary's.

In 1874 Gould was elected on the first school board for Norwich, and was three times re-elected. During the floods of November 1878 he formed a committee of relief. He was president of the Baptist Union in 1879. His nonconformity was of an uncompromising type; he was one of the founders in 1844 of the Anti-State Church Association, which was later renamed as the Liberation Society.

Having preached for the last time on 5 February, Gould died of erysipelas on 13 February 1882, and was buried on 16 February at the Rosary Cemetery, Norwich. He lost the sight of his left eye in 1873.

== Works ==
Gould published, besides single sermons and addresses:

- Outline of the Ecclesiastical History of Ireland, prefixed to Joseph Belcher and Andrew Gunton Fuller's History of the Baptist Irish Society, 1844.
- India; its History, Religion, and Government, 1858 (anon.).
- Open Communion and the Baptists of Norwich, 1860. Gould's volume on the legal case is a contribution to the earlier history of dissent, with extracts from original records.
- Documents relating to the Settlement of the Church of England by the Act of Uniformity of 1662, 1862 (edited by Gould, with introductory essay on English Puritanism by Peter Bayne).

Posthumous was Sermons and Addresses, 1883.

== Family ==
Gould married (May 1843) Elizabeth, younger daughter of Samuel Pearce, of South Molton, Devon, who survived him, with four of their eight children. His eldest son George Pearce Gould, minister (1880) of Cotham Grove Baptist Chapel, Bristol, was his biographer. The Rev George Pearce Gould (his biographer) became the principal of Regent's Park College in London (1896-1920), now Regent's Park College, a permanent private hall at Oxford University. Another son was Alfred Gould (surgeon), later Sir Alfred Pearce Gould, a vice-chancellor of the University of London from 1916 to 1917 and one of the first trustees of Save the Children.

== Notes ==
Attribution

This article incorporates text from a publication now in the public domain: Stephen, Leslie; Lee, Sidney, eds. (1890). "Gould, George". Dictionary of National Biography. Vol. 22. London: Smith, Elder & Co.
