= St Thomas the Martyr, Bristol =

Church in Bristol, England

St Thomas the Martyr
- Church of St Thomas the Martyr
- Biserica Ortodoxă Română Bristol
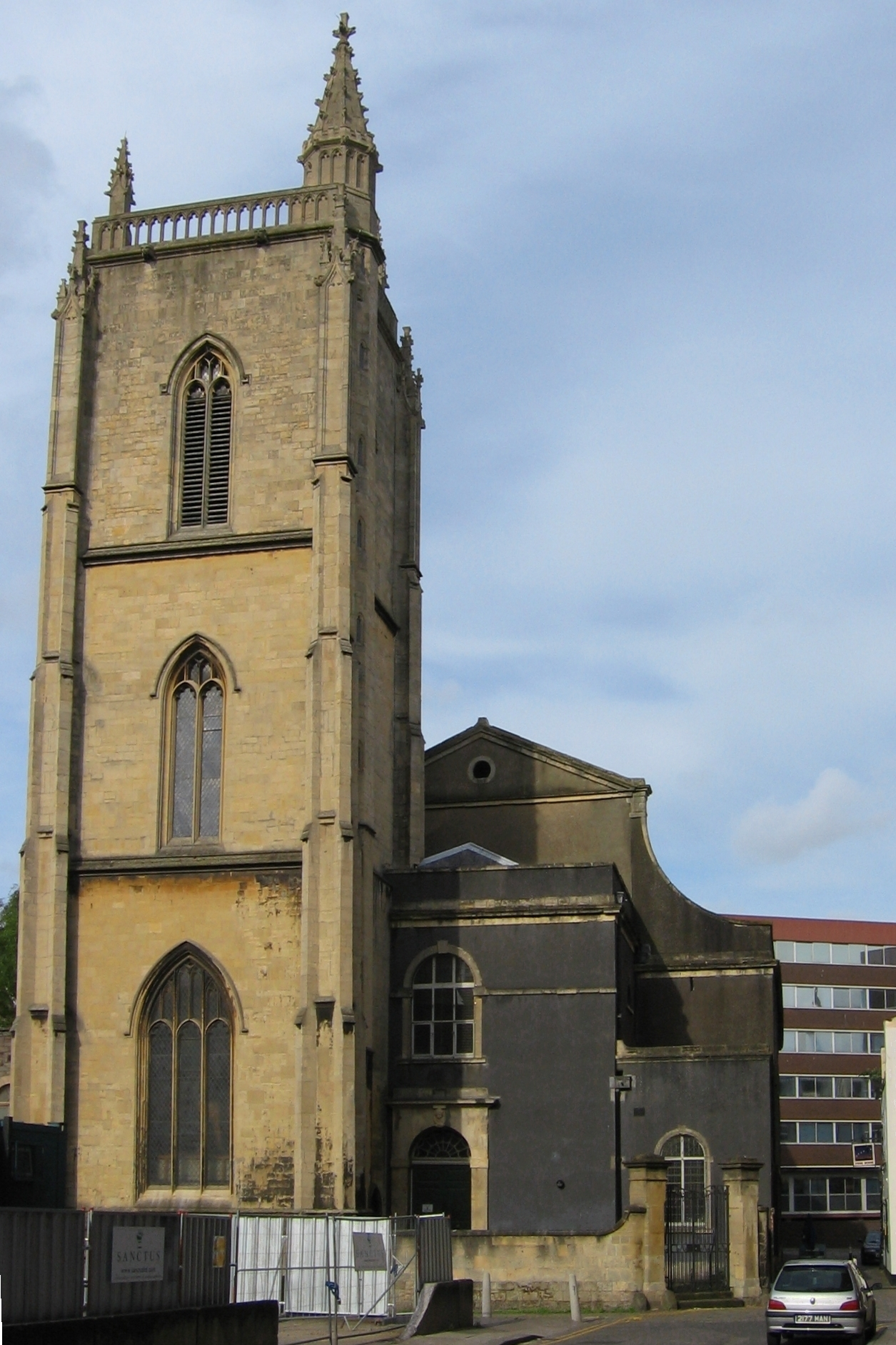
- The 15th-century tower
- St Thomas the Martyr
- 51.4527°N 2.5914°W
- Location: St Thomas Street, Redcliffe
- Country: England
- Denomination: Church of England

History
- Status: Redundant
- Founded: c. 1170s
- Dedication: Thomas Becket

Architecture
- Architect(s): James Allen (nave); William Venn Gough (tower top/interior)
- Style: Perpendicular Gothic (tower); Neoclassical (nave)
- Groundbreaking: 1791 (nave rebuild)
- Completed: 14th century (tower); 21 December 1793 (nave)
- Construction cost: £5,000 (1793 nave) £3,877 (1880 restoration)
- Closed: 19 December 1982

Listed Building – Grade II*
- Official name: Church of St Thomas Including Wall, Gates and Gateway
- Designated: 8 January 1959
- Reference no.: 1202562

St Thomas the Martyr is a former Church of England parish church on St Thomas Street in the Redcliffe district of the English port city of Bristol. It is recorded in the National Heritage List for England as a Grade II* listed building.

The building comprises a 14th-century tower attached to a late 18th-century nave and aisles designed by James Allen. Historically a chapel of ease to Bedminster, it became a significant place of worship for the wealthy merchant class of Redcliffe. Although the church survived the Bristol Blitz of World War II, the congregation declined in the post-war period. It was declared redundant and is now in the care of the Churches Conservation Trust, having been vested in the Trust on 17 February 1988.

The building is currently leased by the Churches Conservation Trust to the Romanian Orthodox Parish of Saints Constantine and Helena (Romanian: Parohia Sfinții Împărați Constantin și Elena). The parish was founded in 2011 and is led by Father Ioan Claudiu Moldovan, who also serves as the area's Dean for the Southwest and Wales.

== History ==
=== Early history ===
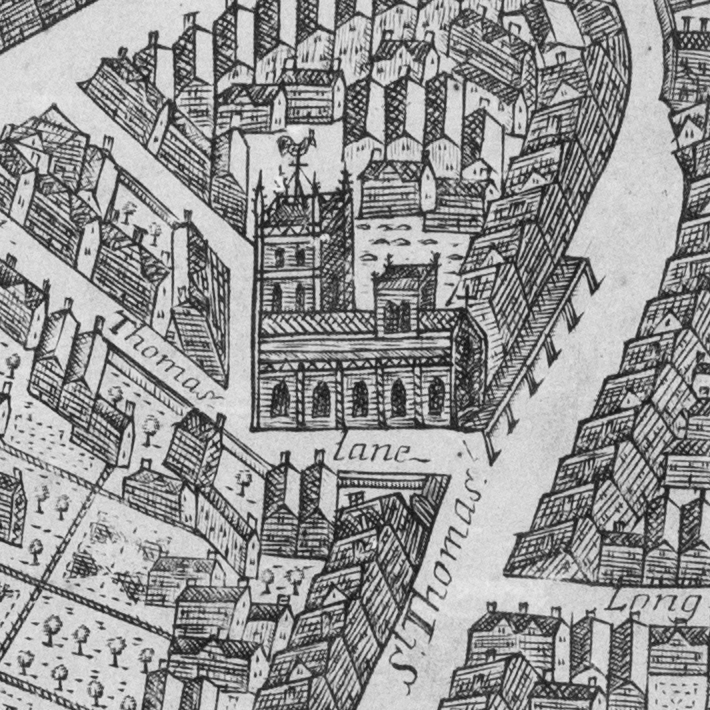
St Thomas the Martyr in James Millerd's An Exact Delineation of the Famous Citty of Bristoll and Suburbs, 1728

The church was likely founded in the 1170s, a period of expansion for Bristol south of the River Avon driven by the prosperity of the wool trade. It was dedicated to Thomas Becket, who was martyred in 1170; the dedication may have been influenced by Becket's role as Chancellor when Bristol received its earliest charter. Throughout the Middle Ages, St Thomas's, along with its neighbour St Mary Redcliffe, functioned as a chapel of ease to the mother church of Bedminster, rather than as an independent parish church.

By the 15th century, the church had been enriched by the area's wealthy merchants, becoming the second largest church in the city after St Mary Redcliffe. The medieval structure was spacious, and the 1673 map by James Millerd depicts it with a central lantern tower or cupola on the nave roof. This was a feature noted in 1480 by the chronicler William Worcester, who measured the church and described the surrounding topography, including a pentice (covered walkway) and a "square house of freestone" for the water conduit. The church became the burial place for several generations of the prominent Canynges family, including William Canynges the Elder (d. 1396) and his son John Canynges (d. 1405). Other notable chantries were founded by John Stokes (1383), John Burton (1454), and Richard de Welles (1333); another was established for intercessory prayer for King Richard II.

The parish was a site of religious dissent in the early 15th century. Following the Oldcastle Revolt of 1414, several parishioners were tried for Lollardy in the church before commissioners of the Bishop of Bath and Wells. In 1499, further heresy trials were conducted involving parishioners accused of opposing pilgrimages and the veneration of images.

=== Reformation and Civil War ===
During the English Reformation, the church was a venue for significant preaching; in Lent 1553, the reformer and future martyr Bishop Hugh Latimer preached at St Thomas's. However, the dedication to Thomas Becket became politically dangerous due to Henry VIII's campaign against the saint. In 1538, the King issued a proclamation declaring Becket a traitor; consequently, the church was often referred to as "St Thomas the Apostle" to avoid royal displeasure. The church seal was altered in 1566 to read "Thomas the Apostle of Jesus Christ", though the original dedication was eventually restored in common usage.

The church played a role in the English Civil War. In 1645, following the Parliamentarian recapture of Bristol, the vicar Thomas Collins was sequestrated from the living. During the Interregnum, the church lacked a regular incumbent, relying on stipendiary preachers paid by the vestry. The admiral William Penn, father of the founder of Pennsylvania, was baptised at St Thomas in 1621.

By the 18th century, the area around the church had become a bustling commercial district. In 1710, the vicar complained that the noise from the cattle market held in the streets was hindering church services. The Seven Stars, located beside the church, is historically significant for its association with Thomas Clarkson, who in 1786 collected evidence there from sailors regarding the slave trade, which contributed to the abolition movement.

=== 18th-century reconstruction ===
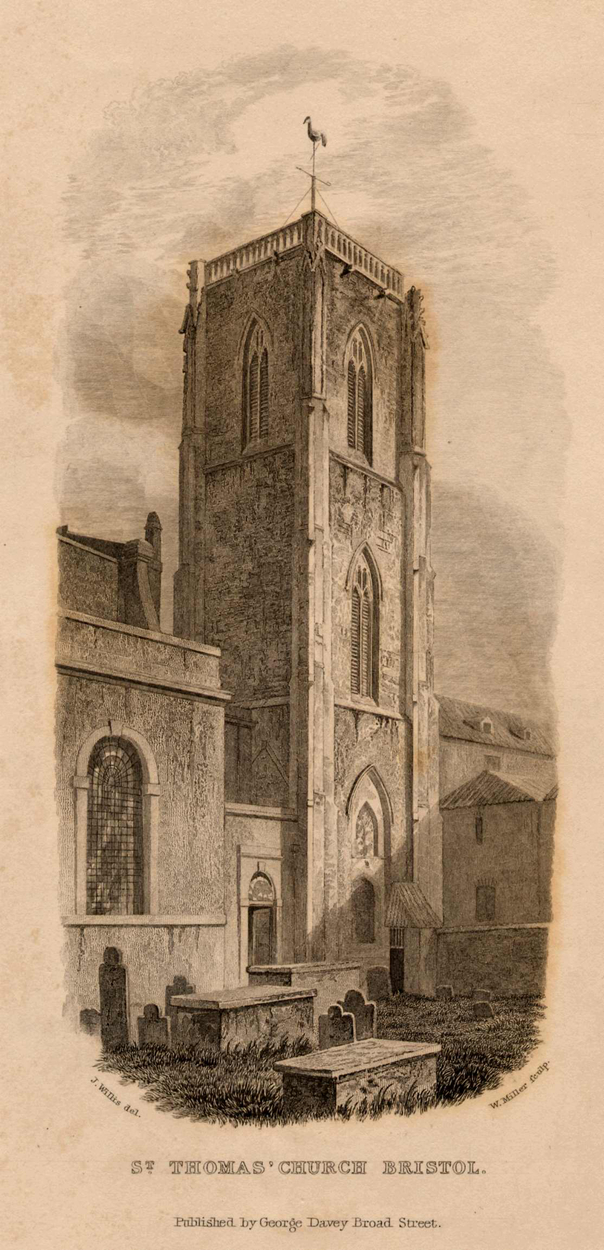
Engraving of St Thomas the Martyr (c. 1838), showing the 18th-century nave, medieval tower, and the former livestock market

By the late 18th century, the medieval fabric, with the exception of the tower, was deemed structurally unsound. In 1789, the architect James Allen, a parishioner living in St Thomas Street, declared the roof and walls dangerous. Despite the medieval building being described by the historian William Barrett as "next to Redcliff, the largest as well as most elegant building", the decision was made to demolish it.

An Act of Parliament was obtained in 1790 to raise funds for the rebuilding. Construction began in 1791, and the new church opened on St Thomas's Day, 21 December 1793. Allen's design was a classical preaching box, intended to be spacious and well-lit, retaining the 15th-century tower at the west end. The reconstruction cost approximately £5,000. Allen went bankrupt the same year the church opened.

=== 19th and 20th centuries ===
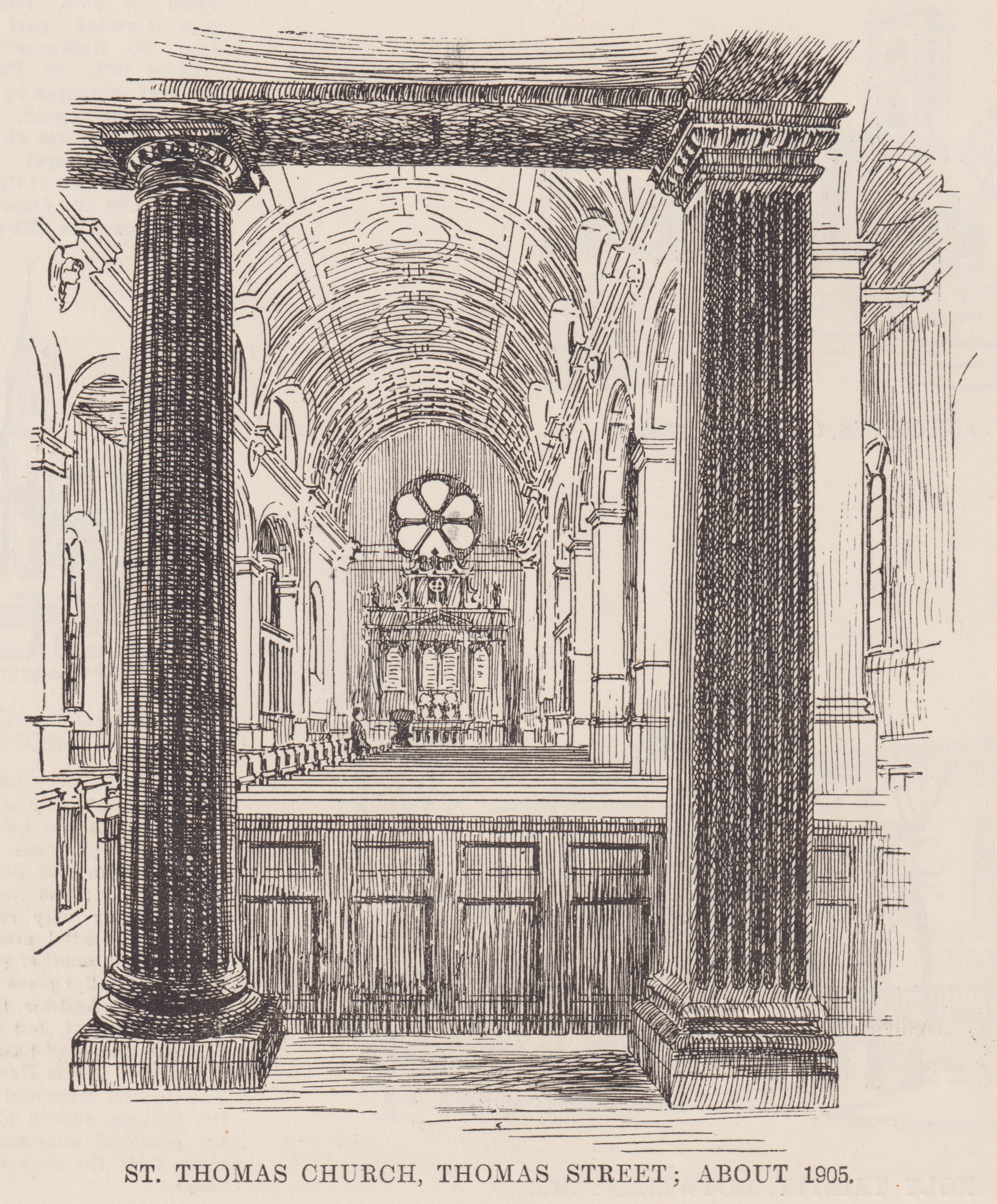
Interior of the church, by Samuel Loxton, 1905

The church underwent significant alterations in the Victorian era. In 1878–80, the architect William Venn Gough carried out a substantial reordering. This involved cutting down the 18th-century high box pews, removing the three-deck pulpit, and installing stencil decoration which was later criticised by architectural historians as "hideous". The restoration cost £3,877; a deficit in funding was avoided by a timely legacy of £500 from Jane Steele, the daughter of the mason who had built the church in the 1790s. Gough also remodelled the top of the medieval tower in 1896–97, adding the pierced parapet and pinnacles to what had previously been described as a "bare, dilapidated summit". The church established strong military links during the early 20th century. Before it became the spiritual home of the Royal Tank Regiment, it hosted annual church parades for veterans of the South African War (1899–1902) that concluded at the Boer War Memorial.

Although the church escaped major damage during the Bristol Blitz—a bomb reportedly demolished a shelter in the churchyard but was contained by a brick grave—demographic changes in the city centre led to a decline in the congregation. It ceased to be a parish church in 1956, becoming a centre for industrial mission. During the 1960s, the church hall was used by the Bristol community of the Polish Church in Exile, who held services there in Church Slavonic.

The church was finally closed for regular worship on 19 December 1982. While the diocese claimed the closure went "almost unnoticed", it was strongly criticised by the Old Comrades' Association of the 44th Royal Tank Regiment, who regarded St Thomas's as their spiritual home and maintained a war memorial there. In 1989, plans were approved to convert the building into the headquarters of the Orchestra for Europe, a training orchestra for young musicians, but the scheme was delayed by ecclesiastical law and eventually abandoned.

=== Current usage ===
The building is currently leased by the Churches Conservation Trust to a Romanian Orthodox Church community (Romanian: Biserica Ortodoxă Română Bristol) who use it for worship on Sundays and special days. The community celebrated its first patronal feast at the church in May 2012, an event attended by the Romanian Ambassador Ion Jinga. During this service, a cross for the new altar was donated by the religious singer Teodora Țucă Păunescu. Ambassador Jinga returned to the church for a second official visit in May 2013, addressing a congregation of over 200 people regarding the Romanian diaspora in the United Kingdom. The parish hosts public tours and concerts as part of the annual Heritage Open Days festival.

The church is also used as a venue for secular events, including concerts by artists such as Lady Nade and candlelight performances, as well as art installations like Hew Locke's Colston (2006). In 2022, the Trust was awarded a grant of £28,550 by the Enovert Community Trust to carry out urgent conservation work, including re-roofing the tower and lobbies to repair significant water damage.

== Architecture and fittings ==
=== Exterior ===
The church presents a mix of architectural styles, combining a Perpendicular Gothic tower with a late Georgian Classical nave. The body of the church, built 1791–93, is constructed of Bath stone ashlar and render. The most significant architectural feature of Allen's design is the east elevation facing St Thomas Street. This facade treats the almost windowless east wall as a variation of a Venetian window; it features paired Ionic pilasters and a central arch topped by a pediment containing a carved cherub's head and swag. The original semi-circular east window was replaced in 1888 by the current circular wheel window. The north elevation is plain, rendered with cement, and pierced by simple semi-circular arched windows.

Situated outside the church on the south side is a conduit known as The Pipe. It was originally fed by a spring on Pylle Hill and has supplied water to the parish since at least the early 15th century. It served an essential role in the local wool trade.

==== Tower ====
The 15th-century tower at the west end features three stages with diagonal buttresses and an octagonal stair turret on the south-east corner, capped by a spirelet. The parapet and pinnacles are Victorian additions by Gough. The tower contains a ring of eight bells. The tenor bell was originally cast in 1666 by Roger Purdue of Bristol and bore the inscription: "This bell speaks out, when me you hear come and appear, though Thomas did doubt". However, by 1880 the tenor was chipped, and it was recast by Llewellins & James in 1894. The oldest bells in the ring are the 5th (c. 1425) and the 6th (c. 1480).

=== Interior ===
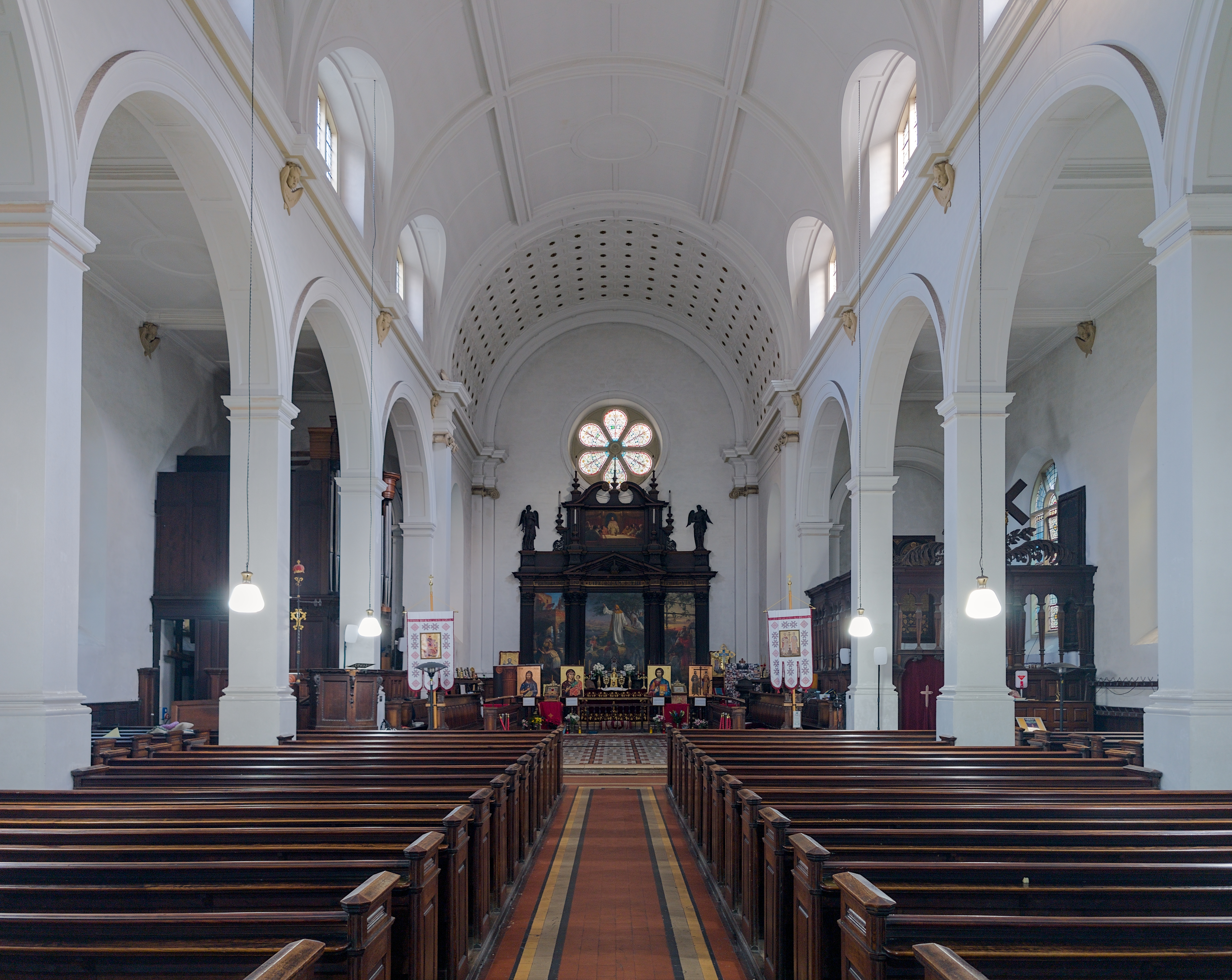
Interior of the church, looking east toward the 1716 reredos

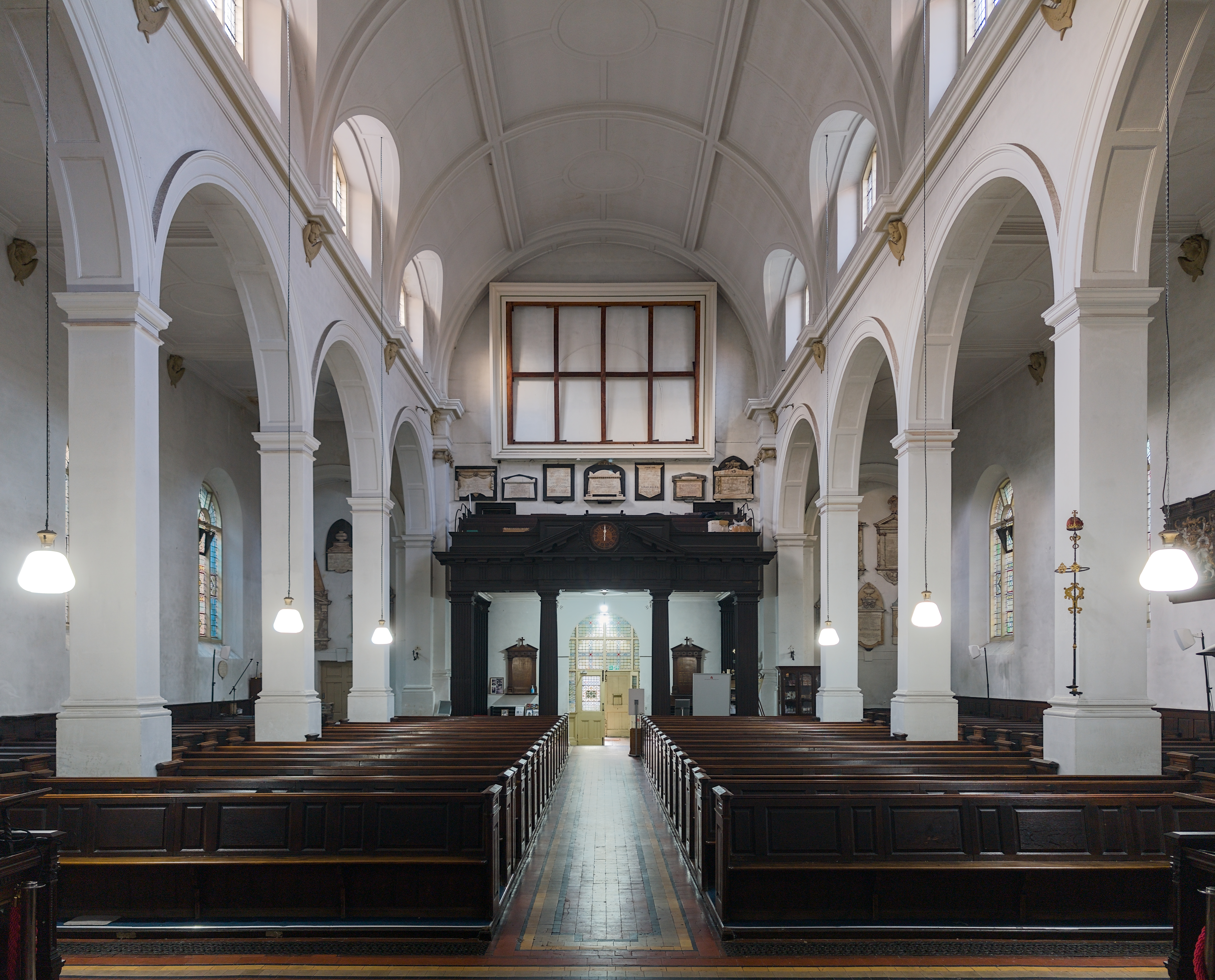
Interior of the church, looking west

The interior is a spacious classical hall, divided into a nave and aisles by square piers with Tuscan capitals supporting semi-circular arches. The nave ceiling is a barrel vault intersected by cross vaults for the clerestory windows, decorated with plaster ribs and cherub heads, a motif repeated throughout the church. The interior was painted white in the late 20th century, removing the Victorian stencilling and lightening the space.

The west end is dominated by a substantial organ gallery of dark oak, dating from 1728. It is supported by Roman Doric columns and features a broken pediment with a central medallion. This gallery was retained from the medieval church during the 18th-century rebuilding.

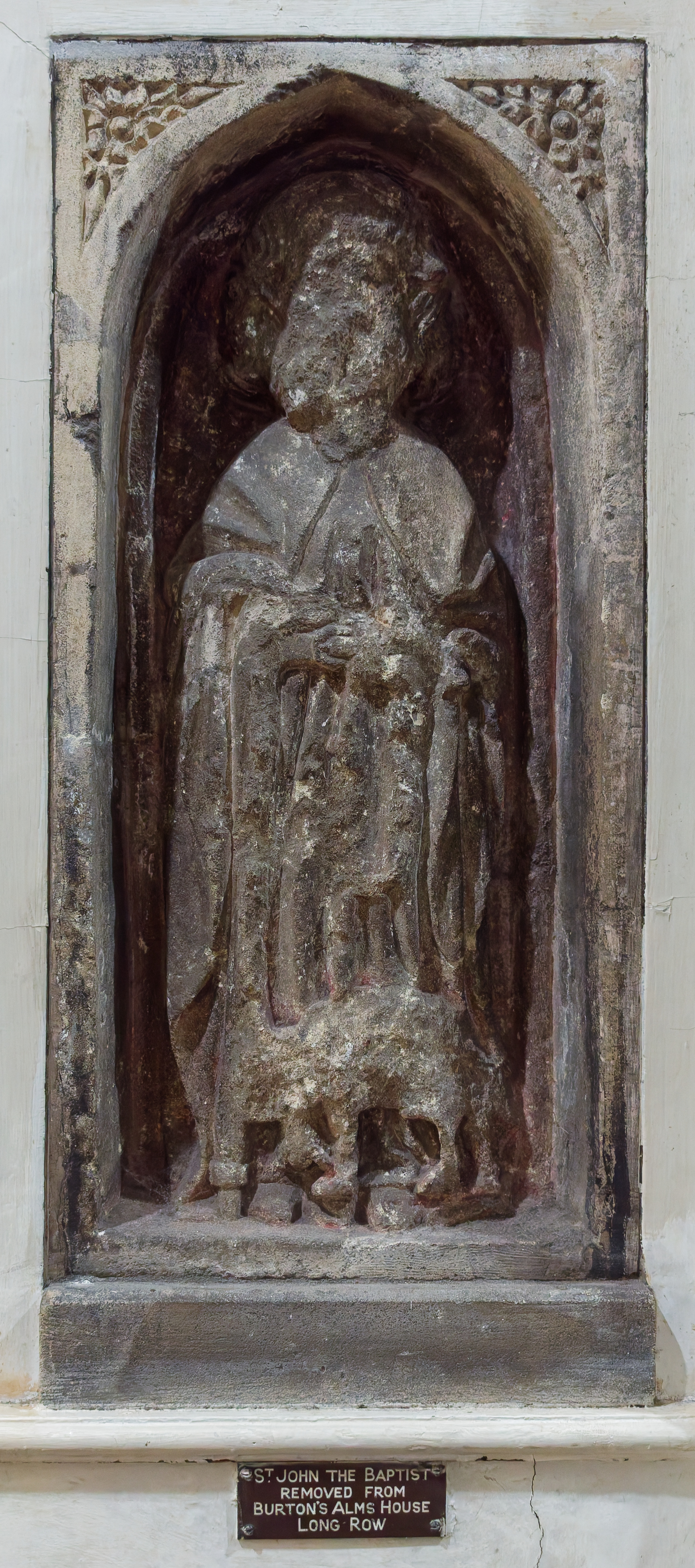
Figure of Saint John the Baptist

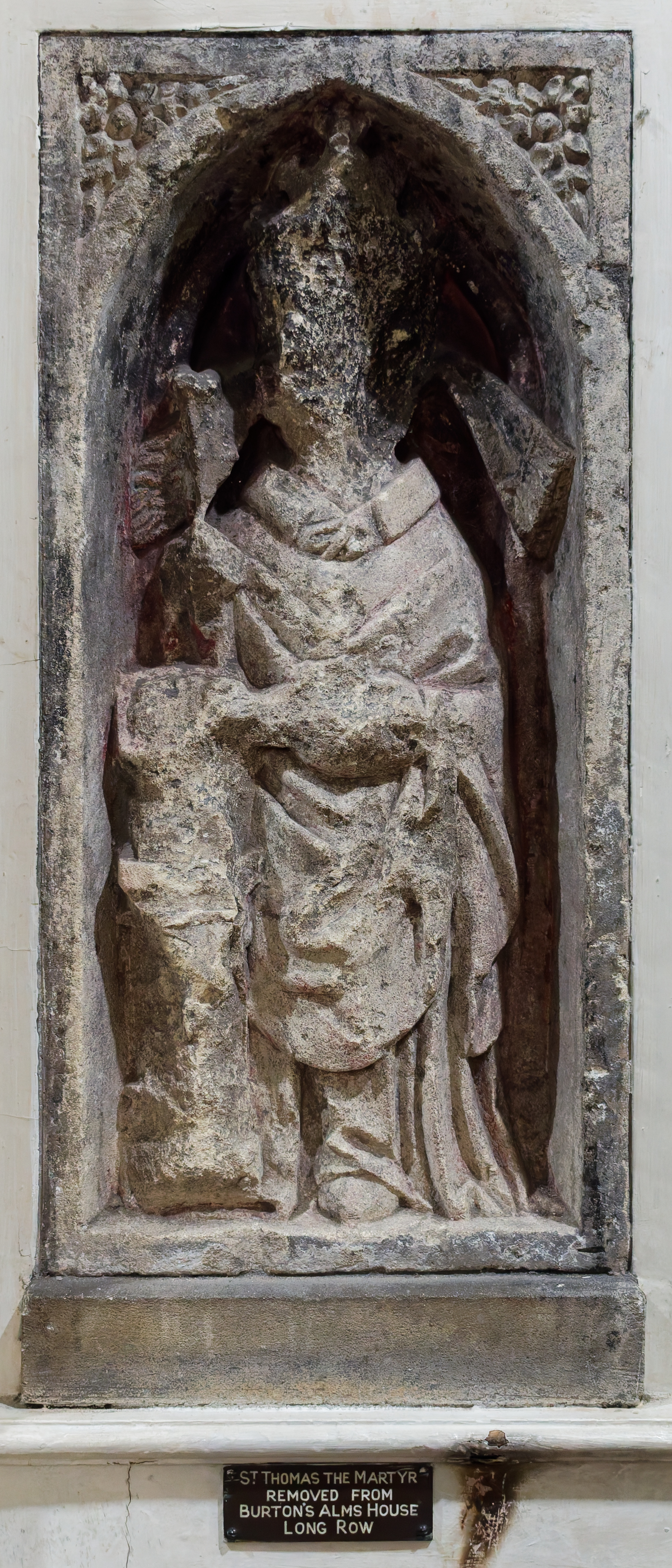
Figure of Saint Thomas the Martyr

13th-century figures at the entrance of the church

St Thomas's retains several significant fittings from the earlier church. The reredos is a piece of early 18th-century woodwork (1716), carved from Flemish oak with Corinthian columns, entablature, and a pelican in piety. In 1906, the panels of the reredos were filled with paintings by the German artist Fritz von Kamptz, depicting scenes such as the Sermon on the Mount and the Good Samaritan. On either side of the western entrance to the nave are two carved wooden figures of St Thomas and St John the Baptist; these were discovered in 1940 built into the walls of the nearby Burton's Almshouse during renovations.

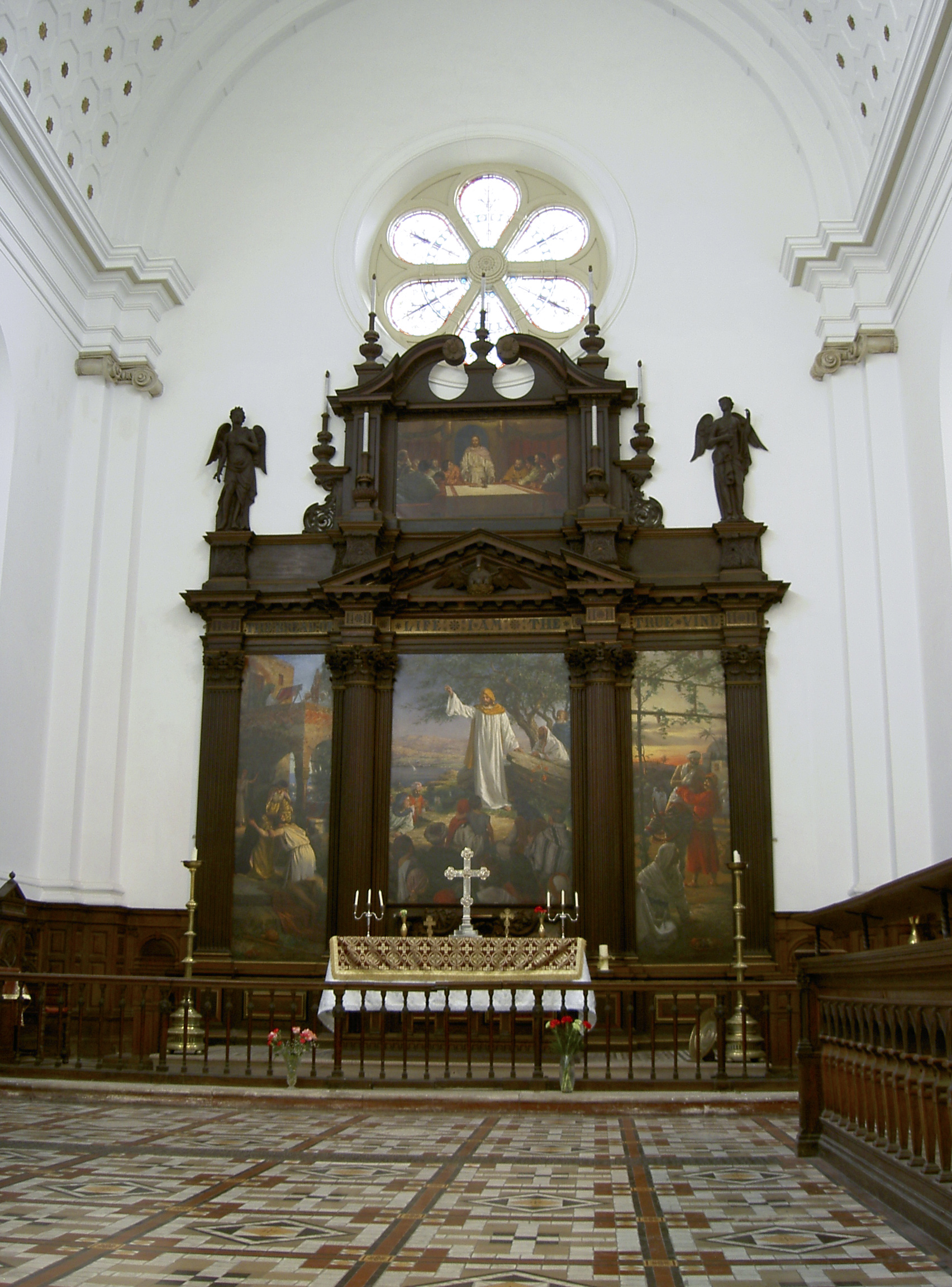
The reredos, painted by Fritz von Kamptz

The north aisle contains a monument to John Herman Kater (d. 1803), a sugar refiner; appropriately, the tablet is surmounted by a sculpted sugarloaf. Other fittings include a sword rest (1637) for the Lord Mayor of Bristol, a pair of 17th-century chests, and a marble font installed in 1879. A cutlass, reportedly picked up after the 1831 Bristol riots, is preserved in the vestry. Four medieval stone roof bosses, including one depicting two dragons, were returned to the church in 2017. The church previously possessed a set of rare 13th-century Limoges enamel candlesticks and a 14th-century Vulgate Bible. The Bible, one of only three of its type in England, was damaged by floodwater in the tower during the Second World War but was restored in 1977; both the candlesticks and the Bible are now held in museum or archive collections for preservation.

==== Organ ====
The medieval church housed a notable organ built by John Harris in 1729, which was admired by George Frideric Handel. It was moved to the new church in 1793 and subsequently rebuilt by W. G. Vowles in the 19th century and William Hill & Son & Norman & Beard in 1955. A fire in 1991 caused by an electrical fault destroyed the pipework; the 18th-century case survived, and pipes from the redundant church of St Werburgh were subsequently installed. The organ casing contains historic graffiti, including the name "A Webber" and dates such as "1771" and "1773", which predate the instrument's move to the new building.

== See also ==
- Churches in Bristol
- Grade II* listed buildings in Bristol
- List of churches preserved by the Churches Conservation Trust in Southwest England
