= Peter Bayne =

Scottish author

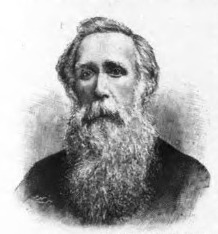
- Born: 19 October 1830; Fodderty
- Died: 10 February 1896; Upper Norwood
- Education: University of Aberdeen
- Occupations: Theologian, writer

Peter Bayne (1830–1896) was a Scottish author, who used the pseudonym Ellis Brandt.

== Life ==
Bayne was born at the manse, Fodderty, Ross-shire on 19 October 1830, the second son of Isabella Jane Duguid and Reverend Charles John Bayne (1797-1832), the minister at Fodderty. He was educated at Inverness Academy, Aberdeen Grammar School and Bellevue academy. He studied at Marischal College, Aberdeen graduating with an MA in 1850. While a student he won a prize for an English poem, and in 1854 was awarded the Blackwell prize for a prose essay.

After Aberdeen he studied theology at New College, Edinburgh in preparation for the ministry. As a result of poor health, asthma and bronchial problems, preaching was not feasible, and he turned instead to journalistic and literary work as a profession. From 1850 he wrote for Edinburgh magazines, and in the following years his work appeared in Hogg's Weekly Magazine and Tait's Edinburgh Magazine. He was for a short time editor of the Glasgow Commonwealth. In 1856, on the death of his friend Hugh Miller, whose biography he wrote, he succeeded Millar as editor of the Edinburgh magazine Witness.

He visited Germany to learn German, and while there met Clotilda Gerwein, daughter of General J. P. Gerwien. They married in 1858.

Up to this point his career had been successful, and his collected essays brought him recognition both in Scotland and America. In 1860 he became editor of Dial, an ambitious weekly London-based newspaper planned by the National Newspaper League Company. The Dial proved a financial failure. Bayne attempted to save the publication through his editorship and by investing in the paper himself. However he lost all his own property in the venture, and was in debt for many years. In April 1862, he retired from the Dial, and became editor of the Weekly Review, the organ of the English presbyterian church. This he resigned in 1865, because his views on inspiration were held to be unsound, and be declined any further editorial responsibilities.

Bayne became a regular leader writer for the Christian World, under the editorship of James Clarke. For more than 20 years his combination of broad-minded progressive liberalism with earnest and eager evangelicalism gave a distinct colour to the religious, social, political, and literary teaching of this paper. This formed the main work of Bayne's life; but he wrote independently on the history of seventeenth century England, many essays of literary criticism, and a biography of Martin Luther. Additionally, Bayne contributed occasionally to the Nonconformist, the Spectator, and other weekly papers, as well as to the leading reviews, notably the Contemporary Review, the Fortnightly, the British Quarterly, the London Quarterly, and Fraser's Magazine.

In 1879, the degree of LLD was conferred on him by the University of Aberdeen. He died at Norwood on 10 February 1896, and is buried in Harlington churchyard, Middlesex, where he resided during the earlier half of his London career.

== Family ==
He married three times, but had issue only by his first wife, who died in childbirth in 1865, leaving him with three sons and two daughters. His second wife, Anna Katharine, daughter of Herbert Mayo of Oakhill, Hampstead, whom he married in 1869, died in 1882 after a life of devotion to the welfare of his children. His third wife became insane towards the end of 1895, and grief on this account contributed to his own death.

== Works ==
Besides many uncollected magazine articles, several pamphlets, and part of the fourth volume of the National History of England (1877), Bayne's chief works are:

- The Christian Life, Social and Individual, Edinburgh, 1855, 8vo; Boston, 1857; new edit. London, 1859.
- Essays, Biographical, Critical, and Miscellaneous, Edinburgh, 1859, 8vo. These were also published in Boston, Massachusetts, in two volumes.
- The Testimony of Christ to Christianity, London, 1862, 8vo.
- Life and Letters of Hugh Miller, London, 1871, 2 vols. 8vo.
- The Days of Jezebel: an historical drama, London, 1872, 8vo.
- Emma Cheyne: a Prose Idyll of English Life, 1875 (published under the pseudonym of Ellis Brandt).
- The Chief Actors in the Puritan Revolution, London, 1878, 8vo.
- Lessons from my Masters — Carlyle, Tennyson, and Ruskin, London, 1879, 8vo.
- Two Great Englishwomen: Mrs. Browning and Charlotte Bronte, with an Essay on Poetry, London, 1881, 8vo.
- Martin Luther: his Life and Work, London, 1887, 8vo.
- The Free Church of Scotland: her Origin, Founders, and Testimony, Edinburgh, 1893; 2nd edit. 1894.

He also wrote an essay on English Puritanism; its Character and History, prefixed to George Gould's Documents relating to the Settlement of the Church of England, 1862.
