= Greenbank, Bristol =

Area of Bristol, England

Coordinates: 51.468°N 2.557°W

Greenbank
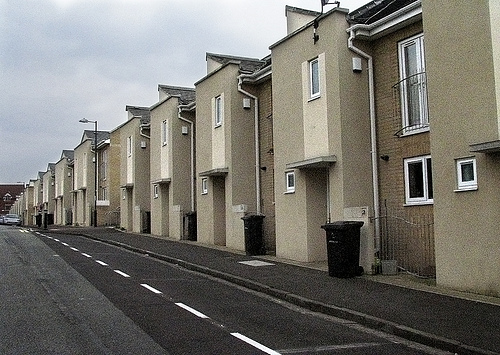
- New housing on Greenbank Road

- Location within Bristol
- OS grid reference: ST617747
- Unitary authority: Bristol
- Ceremonial county: Bristol
- Region: South West
- Country: England
- Sovereign state: United Kingdom
- Post town: BRISTOL
- Postcode district: BS
- Dialling code: 0117
- Police: Avon and Somerset
- Fire: Avon
- Ambulance: South Western

Greenbank is a small informal district in the city of Bristol, England, nestling between Easton to the west, Eastville to the north-east, Clay Bottom and Rose Green to the east, and Whitehall to the south. The area is mainly one of 1890s terraced housing with some present millennium housing on the north eastern edge of the cemetery. Nearly all of the housing is in the north-east of Easton electoral ward, though the road Greenbank View and the cemetery are in Eastville electoral ward.

== Bristol & Bath Railway Path ==
The Bristol & Bath Railway Path forms the north eastern boundary of Greenbank and provides a traffic free route not only the two miles into Bristol, but also 13 miles to Bath along one of the most scenic non-traffic cycle routes in the country. The Path is seen as being a valuable public asset by the people of Greenbank and other adjoining areas, with a 2008 campaign to stop it being used as a bus route garnering much local support. The Path also provides a valuable green haven in the form of a linear park in what is a very densely populated part of Bristol.

== Schools ==
The area is well served with primary schools with Whitehall and May Park both being contiguous to Greenbank proper. The City Academy Bristol is within a few hundred meters down the Railway Path towards Lawrence Hill and Bristol Metropolitan College is only a mile toward Fishponds.

== Greenbank Cemetery ==
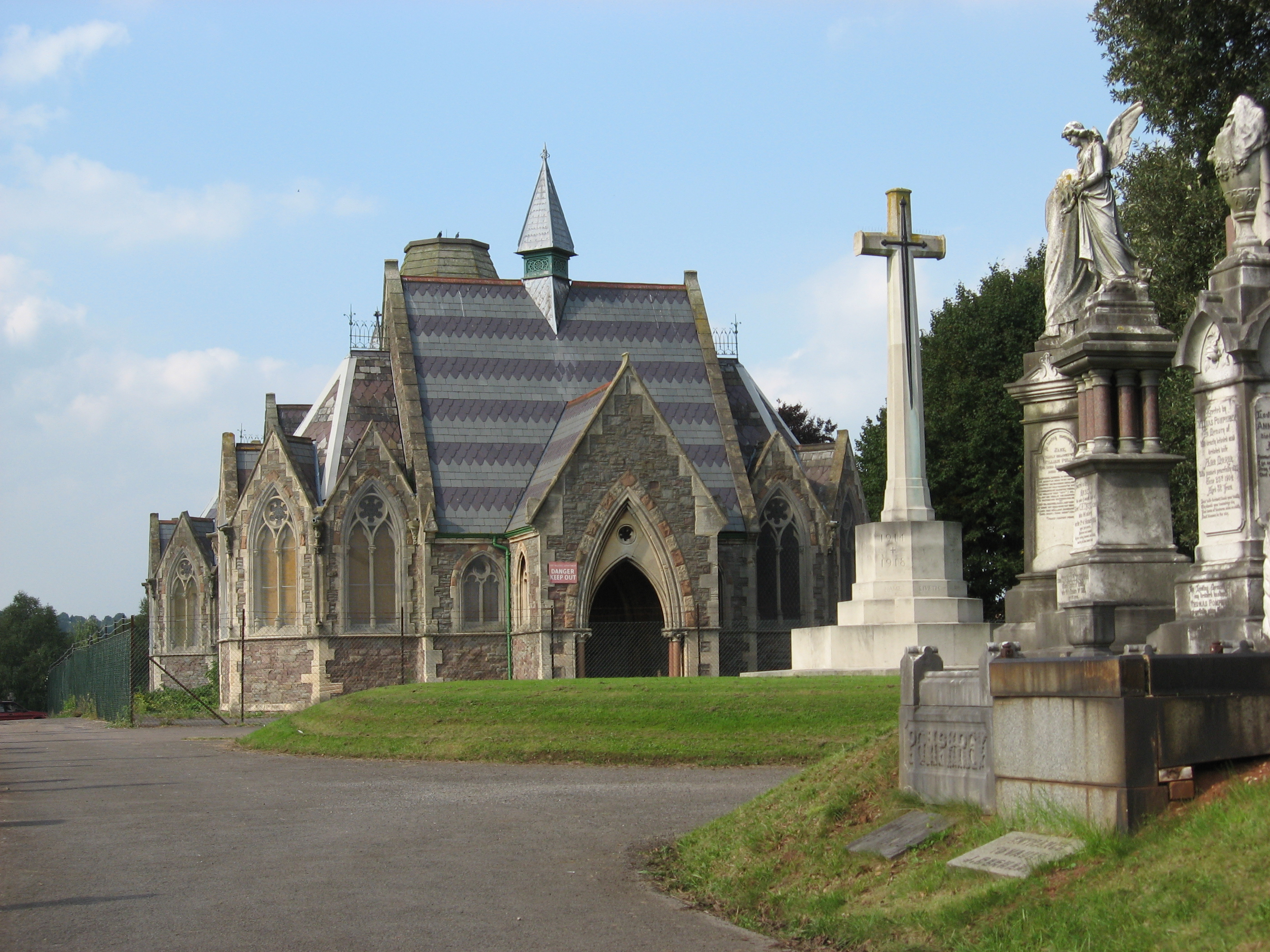
The chapel in Greenbank Cemetery

In the far eastern corner of the cemetery are the memorials to the civilian dead of the Bristol Blitz of 1941. The area is very moving, with some graves containing the remains of three generations of Bristolians. Nearby lies a separate military cemetery with graves from British and Commonwealth servicemen, the graves of German Luftwaffe crew killed during the Bristol Blitz, and Italian Mariners killed in action.

Greenbank cemetery opened in 1871, was extended less than ten years later and again in 1899. The chapel, designed by Henry Masters, has two sections, one chapel for Anglicans and one for nonconformists.

The cemetery was used as a filming location, including for the Trotter brothers' mother's grave in the last ever episode of Only Fools and Horses.

== Buildings ==
There are a few distinctive buildings within the area:

- The Elizabeth Shaw chocolate factory (famous for its 'Famous Names' and 'Chocolate Crisp' brands)
- Chapel in Greenbank Cemetery
- Greenbank Masjid, occupying a church building formerly used by the Castle Green United Reformed Church. Informally known as the "Lego Church", it was designed by Sir Frank Wills and built in 1902.
- St Anne's Church, the parish church designed by George Oatley and consecrated in 1901

== Development of Greenbank Chocolate Factory ==
The factory ceased chocolate production in 2006 First Persimmon and then Square Peg made attempts to secure planning permission and develop the site. In 2013 the factory passed into the hands of the Generator Group. , The local community had been active since 2006 in campaigning for good quality development on the site, had an influence on the fates of the various developers and their plans. The group was still active in organising a community response to Generator's planning applications in 2020.

== Gallery ==
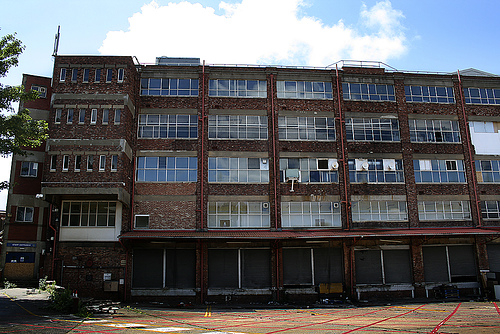
Elizabeth Shaw chocolate factory

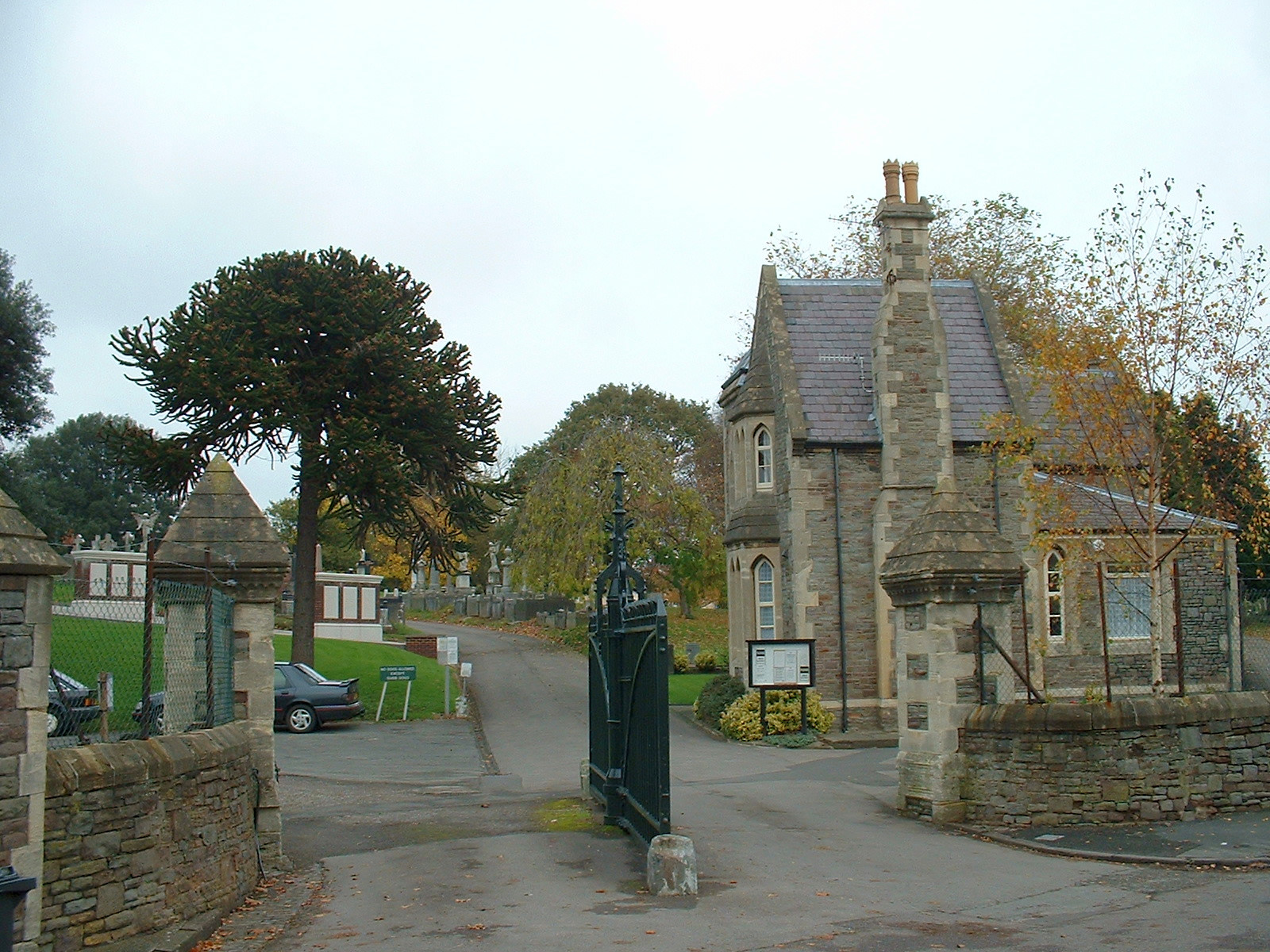
Greenbank Road entrance of Greenbank Cemetery

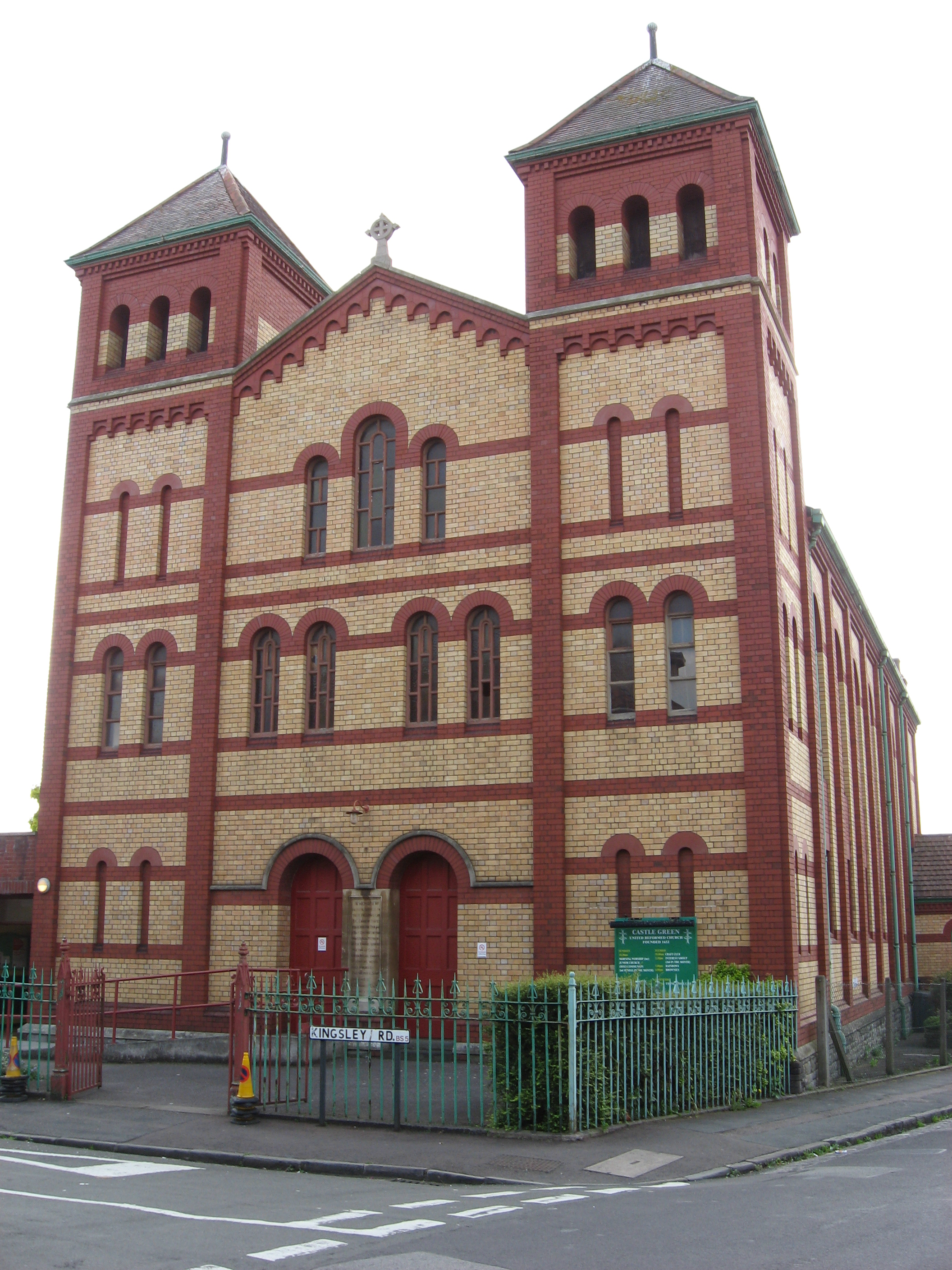
Castle Green United Reformed Church in 2008
