= Counterslip Baptist Church =

Church in south Bristol, England

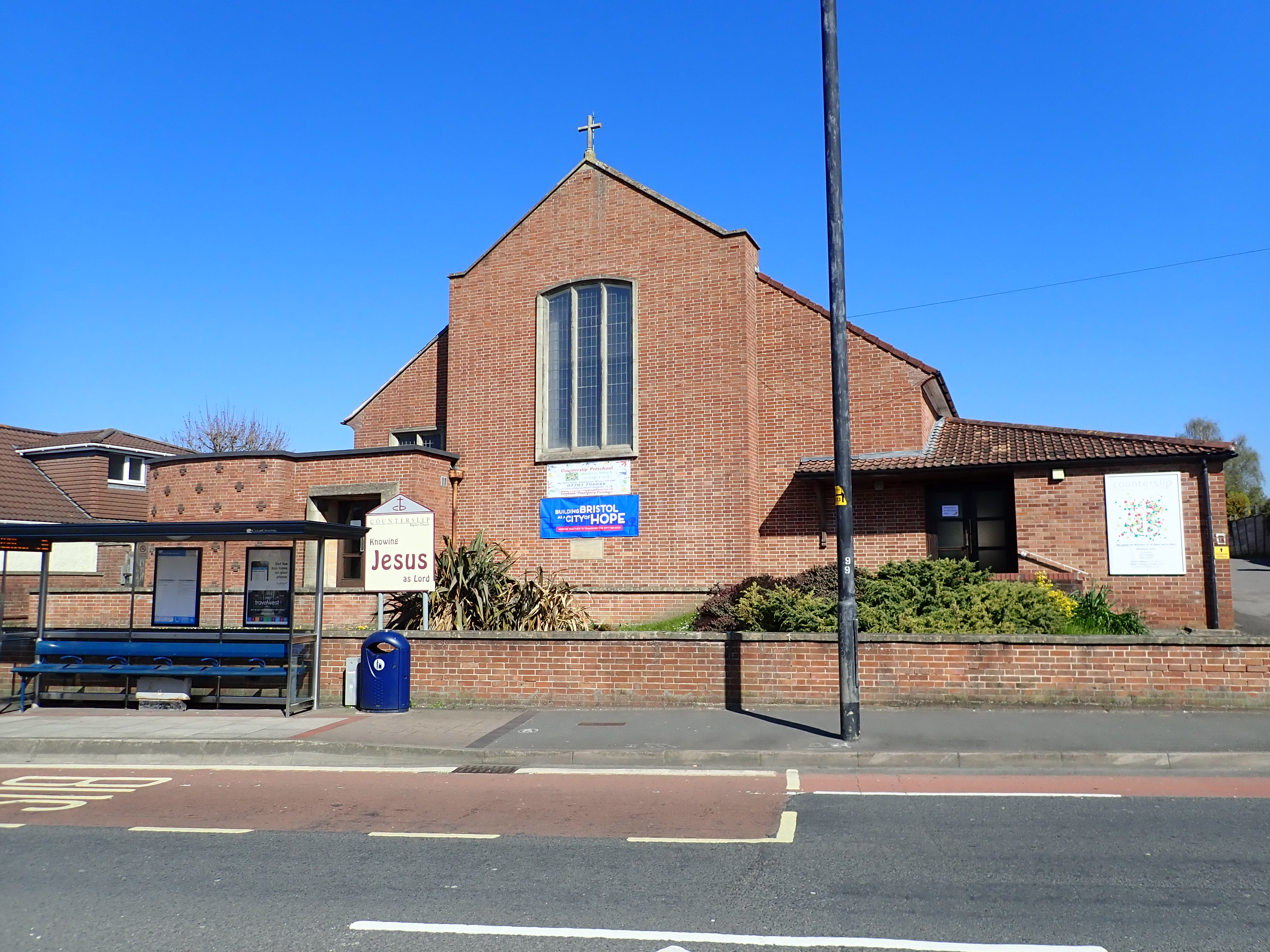
- Western façade

- Location within Bristol

Religion
- Affiliation: Baptist Church

Location
- Location: Bristol, England
- Coordinates: 51.416101°N 2.559539°W

Website
- http://www.counterslip.org

Counterslip Baptist Church is a church located in south Bristol, England. It has been located on its Wells Road site on the Wells Road since the 1950s having previously been located on Counterslip near Bristol Bridge. In 2023 the church discerned the call of God for them to leave the Wells Road site, and so since November 2024 has been meeting for its Sunday morning services at the Oasis Academy John Williams on Petherton Road.

The church was founded in 1804 when 49 members of the declining Pithay Church (which later became Kings Street and eventually Cairns Road Baptist Church) left and decided to set up a church of their own at Tailor's Court. The first service was held on 12 November that year. By 1810, numbers at the church had risen to around 70. It was then that the church moved to Counterslip and acquired the name that it is still known by today.

By 1822, membership at the church had risen to well over 200. By the mid-1870s, membership had risen to around 500 causing the church to move again, this time to Victoria Street where a chapel was built which was used until the 1940s when it was bombed during the Second World War. The Church used several temporary venues before it moved to the Hengrove Hall in Whitchurch (later the Kingdom Hall used by the Jehovah's Witnesses, then a dance studio). In 1948, the church moved to its Wells Road site where two temporary buildings had been erected, a main church building and a hall. In 1957, work began on the premises that the church has used until November 2024 which opened on 28 June.

== Former ministers ==
- 1804-1810 Rev. H. Perkins
- 1811-1822 Rev. John Holloway
- 1823-1860 Rev. Thomas Winter
- 1862-1872 Rev. R. P. Macmaster
- 1874-1883 Rev. R. W. Skerry
- 1883-1900 Rev. Henry Knee
- 1901-1907 Rev. F. Thompson Smyth
- 1908-1917 Rev. J. Howell Rees
- 1918-1925 Rev. E. W. Probert
- 1925-1938 Rev. A. Glen Smith
- 1939-1943 Rev. W. Hogan
- 1944-1946 Rev. John R. P. S. Wills
- 1947-1952 Rev. S. Marlow
- 1953-1963 Rev. T. Roy Jones
- 1965-1971 Rev. W. F. Bacon
- 1974-1977 Rev. T. C. Bailey
- 1978-1989 Rev. David B. Hewitt
- 1991-1999 Rev. Nigel Coles
- 1999-2004 Rev. Dr Simon Woodman
- 2002-2018 Rev. Ian Sinclair
- 2003-2019 Rev. Mark Godbeer
