= The Vicarage =

A vicarage is a type of clergy house. The Vicarage may refer to:

In England

- The Vicarage, Congresbury
- Embleton Vicarage
- Halton Vicarage
- Holy Cross Inns Court Vicarage

In the United States

- The Vicarage (DeFuniak Springs, Florida)

== See also ==
- Murder at the Vicarage (play), play by Moie Charles and Barbara Toy based on the 1930 novel of the same name by Agatha Christie
- The Murder at the Vicarage, a work of detective fiction by Agatha Christie
- Old Vicarage (disambiguation)
