= 61 Queen Charlotte Street, Bristol =

Listed building in Bristol, England

61 Queen Charlotte Street
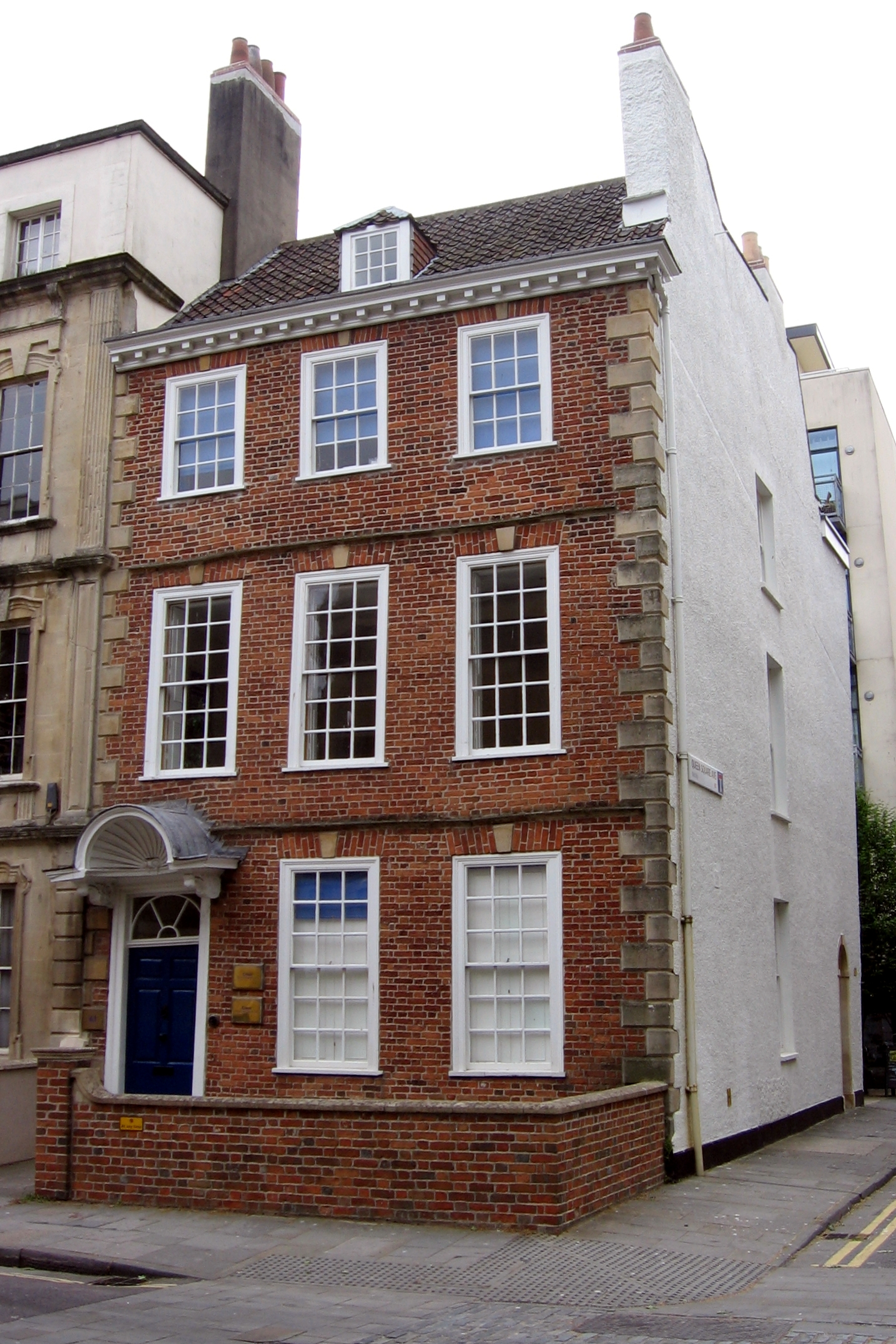
- The building in 2007

- Location within Bristol

General information
- Architectural style: Early Georgian
- Location: Bristol, England
- Coordinates: 51.452115°N 2.593246°W
- Year built: Early 18th century

Listed Building – Grade II*
- Official name: Number 61 and attached front area wall
- Designated: 8 January 1959
- Reference no.: 1217921

61 Queen Charlotte Street is a historic house situated on Queen Charlotte Street in Bristol, England.

It dates from the early 18th century and is similar in design to houses of c. 1710 in nearby Queen Square. 6 King Street is a nearby house with a similar frontage.

It has been designated by English Heritage as a Grade II* listed building and is now used as offices.

== See also ==
- Grade II* listed buildings in Bristol
