= Grade II* listed buildings in Bristol =

There are 212 Grade II* listed buildings in Bristol, England.

In England and Wales, the authority for listing is granted by the Planning (Listed Buildings and Conservation Areas) Act 1990 and is administered by Historic England, an agency of the Department for Culture, Media and Sport

In the United Kingdom, the term listed building refers to a building or other structure officially designated as being of special architectural, historical or cultural significance.

== Buildings ==
Name	Location	Type	Architect	Completed (Note: The date given is the date used by Historic England as significant for the initial building or that of an important part in the structure's description.)	Date designated	Grid ref. (Note: The grid reference is based on the British national grid reference system, sometimes known as OSGB36, used by the Ordnance Survey.) Geo-coordinates	Entry number (Note: The "List Entry Number" is a unique number assigned to each listed building and scheduled monument by Historic England.)	Image	Ref.
2–9 Albemarle Row	Hotwells	House		1763		ST568725	1282410	2–9 Albemarle Row More images	
All Saints church	Bristol city centre	Church		12th century		ST587729	1282313	All Saints church More images	
Arnolfini, Bush House	Bristol city centre	Warehouse		c. 1832		ST585724	1282181	Arnolfini, Bush House More images	
Arno's Court Triumphal Arch	Brislington	Gate		c. 1760		ST611717	1203684	Arno's Court Triumphal Arch More images	
Entrance lodge and gates, Arnos Vale Cemetery	Brislington	Lodge gates		1837–38		ST606716	1203895	Entrance lodge and gates, Arnos Vale Cemetery More images	
Church of England Mortuary Chapel, Arnos Vale Cemetery	Brislington	Chapel				ST606716	1282425	Church of England Mortuary Chapel, Arnos Vale Cemetery More images	
Nonconformist Mortuary Chapel, Arnos Vale Cemetery	Brislington	Chapel				ST606716	1203858	Nonconformist Mortuary Chapel, Arnos Vale Cemetery More images	
Tomb of Thomas Gadd Matthews, Arnos Vale Cemetery	Brislington	Tomb	Tyley	1860	30 January 2003	ST607207	1350402	Tomb of Thomas Gadd Matthews, Arnos Vale Cemetery More images	
Tomb of Raja Rammohun Roy, Arnos Vale Cemetery	Brislington	Tomb	Prinsep	1843	4 March 1977	ST607847	1282389	Tomb of Raja Rammohun Roy, Arnos Vale Cemetery More images	
Ashton Court (Lower Lodge)	Bower Ashton	Gate lodge		c. 1805		ST553723	1203599	Ashton Court (Lower Lodge) More images	
1–6 Berkeley Crescent	Clifton	Terrace		c. 1787 – 1800		ST579731	1282395	1–6 Berkeley Crescent More images	
1–8 Berkeley Square	Clifton	Stepped terrace		c. 1787		ST580730	1282359	1–8 Berkeley Square More images	
20–30 Berkeley Square	Clifton	Stepped terrace		c. 1787		ST580730	1282396	20–30 Berkeley Square More images	
Bishop's House	Clifton	House		1711		ST5743972931	1202102	Upload Photo	
Bishopsworth Manor	Bishopsworth	House		c. 1720		ST571687	1202076	Bishopsworth Manor More images	
Blaise Castle	Henbury	Castle		1766		ST555785	1208115	Blaise Castle More images	
Blaise Castle House	Henbury	House		1796–1798		ST555785	1279500	Blaise Castle House More images	
Bristol City Museum and Art Gallery	Clifton	Art gallery		1899–1904		ST580732	1202478	Bristol City Museum and Art Gallery More images	
41 Broad Street	Bristol city centre	House		c. 1760		ST588730	1202019	Upload Photo	
The Guildhall	Bristol city centre	Hall house		c. 1100		ST587730	1282368	The Guildhall More images	
Buckingham Baptist Chapel	Clifton	Chapel		1842		ST574731	1218249	Buckingham Baptist Chapel More images	
12–13 Buckingham Vale	Clifton	House		c. 1845		ST573967	1204590	Upload Photo	
1–31 Caledonia Place	Clifton	Stepped terrace		c. 1843		ST568729	1204607	1–31 Caledonia Place More images	
Carriage Works	Stokes Croft	Carriage works		1862		ST591740	1025273	Carriage Works More images	
Cathedral School	College Green	Abbey		Founded 1140		ST5834672641	1355157	Cathedral School More images	
Cathedral Church of SS. Peter and Paul	Clifton	Roman Catholic cathedral	Percy Thomas Partnership	1969–1973		ST5728373587	1271209	Cathedral Church of SS. Peter and Paul More images	
Chapel of the Three Kings of Cologne	Bristol city centre	Chapel		1504		ST586731	1202144	Chapel of the Three Kings of Cologne More images	
Charles Wesley's House	Stokes Croft	House		Early 18th century		ST58957365	1205019	Charles Wesley's House More images	
Chesterfield and attached front garden wall	Clifton	Villa		1742		ST5732272920	1280512	Upload Photo	
1–16 Charlotte Street	Bristol city centre	Stepped terrace		1787–c. 1800		ST58077301	1202055	1–16 Charlotte Street More images	
Christ Church with St Ewen	Bristol city centre	Church		1728		ST588730	1282367	Christ Church with St Ewen More images	
Christ Church, Clifton Down	Clifton	Church		1841		ST571739	1202095	Christ Church, Clifton Down More images	
Church Hill House	Brislington	Apartments		c. 1730		ST621708	1282352	Church Hill House More images	
Church House	Bristol city centre	House		19th century		ST5887973480	1220220	Upload Photo	
Church of the Holy Trinity with St Edmund	Horfield	Church		15th century		ST593766	1202667	Church of the Holy Trinity with St Edmund More images	
Church of Holy Trinity, Hotwells	Hotwells	Church		1829		ST571725	1282233	Church of Holy Trinity, Hotwells More images	
Church of Holy Trinity, Stapleton	Stapleton	Church		1857		ST613758	1204074	Church of Holy Trinity, Stapleton More images	
The Clifton Club	Clifton	Terrace	Francis Greenway	1806–1809		ST569731	1292433	The Clifton Club More images	
Guthrie Memorial Chapel, Clifton College	Clifton	Public school	Charles Hansom	From 1866		ST569737	1355185	Upload Photo	
South African War Memorial, Clifton College	Clifton	War memorial	Alfred Drury	1904		ST569737	1282343	South African War Memorial, Clifton College More images	
Clifton Observatory	Clifton	Windmill		18th century		ST566733	1282362	Clifton Observatory More images	
1–23 Cornwallis Crescent	Clifton	Terrace	William Paty	1791–1827	8 January 1959	ST5672	1282314	1–23 Cornwallis Crescent More images	
Council House	Bristol city centre	Gate pier		1935–1952		ST584727	1282341	Council House More images	
Dorset House (formerly Alva House and Dorset House) and attached terrace and balustrade						ST5665473407	1282215	Dorset House (formerly Alva House and Dorset House) and attached terrace and balustrade More images	
4 Dowry Square	Hotwells	House		1748		ST572727	1202206	4 Dowry Square More images	
6 Dowry Square	Hotwells	House		1725		ST572727	1202208	6 Dowry Square More images	
7 Dowry Square	Hotwells	House		1725		ST572727	1202209	7 Dowry Square More images	
9 Dowry Square	Hotwells	House		1725		ST572727	1202210	9 Dowry Square More images	
10 Dowry Square	Hotwells	House		1746		ST572727	1280221	Upload Photo	
11 Dowry Square	Hotwells	House		1746		ST572727	1282299	Upload Photo	
12 Dowry Square	Hotwells	House		1750		ST572727	1206485	Upload Photo	
Engineer's House	Clifton	House		1831		ST565735	1282070	Engineer's House More images	
Former Everard's Printing Works	Bristol city centre	Printing works		1900–01		ST588730	1281234	Former Everard's Printing Works More images	
Foster's Almshouses	Bristol city centre	Gate		1483	4 March 1977	ST586732	1282306	Foster's Almshouses More images	
Freemasons' Hall	Bristol city centre	Gate		1821–1823		ST582729	1282205	Freemasons' Hall More images	
Georgian House	Clifton	Gate		1788–1791		ST581728	1202244	Georgian House More images	
Gothic Tower in gardens of Goldney House	Clifton	Tower		1764		ST571737	1282329	Gothic Tower in gardens of Goldney House More images	
The Granary	Bristol city centre	Wall		1869		ST589727	1202674	The Granary More images	
Holy Cross Inns Court Vicarage	Knowle	House		Early 15th century		ST587691	1202314	Holy Cross Inns Court Vicarage More images	
Holy Trinity Church, Lawrence Hill	Lawrence Hill	Church		1829–1832		ST600734	1282076	Holy Trinity Church, Lawrence Hill More images	
Hercules Statue approximately 100 metres south of Goldney House	Clifton	Statue		1758		ST5744972721	1282327	Hercules Statue approximately 100 metres south of Goldney House More images	
Hydraulic engine house	Hotwells	Hydraulic engine house		1888		ST571721	1202648	Hydraulic engine house More images	
Hydraulic engine house chimney	Hotwells	Hydraulic engine house		1888		ST571721	1218654	Upload Photo	
Nos. 1–14 (consecutive) Royal Promenade and attached front basement railings	Clifton	Terrace		1845–1853		ST5719673146	1218827	Nos. 1–14 (consecutive) Royal Promenade and attached front basement railings	
Nos. 1–15 and attached walls and piers	Clifton	Stepped terrace	Foster and Okely	1840–1843		ST5718572744	1206248	Upload Photo	
6 King Street	Bristol city centre	House		c. 1720		ST588727	1202325	6 King Street More images	
7 and 8 King Street	Bristol city centre	House		c. 1665		ST588727	1202326	7 and 8 King Street More images	
Nos. 14–34 (consecutive) and attached front basement area railings	Clifton	Terrace	Foster and Okely	c. 1843		ST5675473040	1219389	Nos. 14–34 (consecutive) and attached front basement area railings More images	
16 King Street	Bristol city centre	House		c. 1665		ST588727	1202328	16 King Street More images	
17 King Street	Bristol city centre	House		c. 1665		ST588727	1282240	17 King Street More images	
66 Prince Street	Bristol city centre	House		c. 1725		ST5860672467	1202453	Upload Photo	
King William and Naval Volunteer Public Houses	Bristol city centre	Row		c. 1670		ST588727	1292605	King William and Naval Volunteer Public Houses More images	
Kingsley Hall	Old Market Street	Row		1706		ST596731	1207565	Kingsley Hall More images	
Lewin's Mead Unitarian meeting house	Bristol city centre	Chapel		1706		ST58947332	1202353	Lewin's Mead Unitarian meeting house More images	
The Lido, Bristol	Clifton	Manager's house		1850		ST576735	1323692	The Lido, Bristol More images	
Litfield House and attached front basement balustrades	Clifton	Villa	Charles Dyer	1830		ST5680673377	1202354	Upload Photo	
Llandoger Trow	Bristol city centre	Public house		1664	8 January 1959	ST5887672713	1202324	Llandoger Trow More images	
Lloyds Bank	Bristol city centre	Public house		1854–1858		ST587729	1187398	Lloyds Bank More images	
Lower Arcade	Bristol city centre	Shopping arcade		1824–25	8 January 1959	ST591733	1202024	Lower Arcade More images	
Numbers 11, 13 and 15 Manor Road and Attached Garden Wall	Fishponds	House		1720		ST6334276006	1282219	Numbers 11, 13 and 15 Manor Road and Attached Garden Wall More images	
Merchant Tailors Hall	Bristol city centre	Guild hall		1740–41		ST588731	1282105	Merchant Tailors Hall More images	
Merchant Venturers Almshouses	Bristol city centre	Almshouse		1696–1699	8 January 1959	ST587727	1202333	Merchant Venturers Almshouses More images	
Mortimer House	Clifton	House		Early 19th century		ST5708673167	1202096	Mortimer House More images	
Norland House	Clifton	House		c. 1830		ST568735	1281026	Upload Photo	
Nos. 1–13 and attached front basement area railings	Clifton	Terrace		1788		ST5687773102	1291489	Nos. 1–13 and attached front basement area railings	
No. 11 and attached front area railings	Bristol city centre	House		1717–1722		ST5840872932	1202402	Upload Photo	
No. 10 and attached front area railings	Bristol city centre	House		1717–1722		ST5840872932	1207742	Upload Photo	
Nos. 20 to 24 and attached railings	Bristol city centre	House		1717–1722		ST5840872932	1207796	Nos. 20 to 24 and attached railings	
Nos. 29 to 40 and attached basement area railings, terrace, balustrade and wall to No. 40	Clifton	Terrace		1791–1827		ST5709672814	1207461	Upload Photo	
No. 10 and attached railings	Bristol city centre	House		1717–1722		ST5840872932	1279607	No. 10 and attached railings	
Nos. 15 to 25 (consecutive) and attached front basement area and garden railings to north east	Clifton	Terrace		c. 1855		ST5720373079	1291767	Upload Photo	
Nos. 36, 37 and 38 Queen Square Terrace	Bristol city centre	Terrace		c. 1703		ST5871672478	1202468	Upload Photo	
No. 61 Queen Charlotte Street and attached front area wall	Bristol city centre	House		Early 18th century		ST5887872635; 51°27′08″N 2°35′36″W	1217921	No. 61 Queen Charlotte Street and attached front area wall More images	
Old Council House	Bristol city centre	Council house		1824–1827		ST587729	1207433	Old Council House More images	
Old Library	Bristol city centre	Council house		1738–1740		ST588727	1282241	Old Library More images	
Nos. 1–14 Lansdown Place and attached front area balustrades and piers	Clifton	Terrace		1835		ST5733573184	1218951	Upload Photo	
15 The Paragon	Clifton	House	Stephen Hunter	c. 1814	8 January 1959	ST5672	1202628	Upload Photo	
1–14 The Paragon	Clifton	Terrace	John Drew / Stephen Hunter	1809–1814	8 January 1959	ST5672	1210010	1–14 The Paragon	
Arnos Manor Hotel	Brislington	House		1760	8 January 1959	ST615710	1201988	Arnos Manor Hotel More images	
Prospect House and attached front basement balustrades	Clifton	House	Thomas Paty	1765		ST5735072908	1205847	Upload Photo	
59 Queen Charlotte Street	Bristol city centre	House		1709	8 January 1959	ST588727	1202464	Upload Photo	
1—9 Queen Square	Bristol city centre	Terrace		1701–1727		ST591722	1217926	1—9 Queen Square More images	
27–28 Queen Square	Bristol city centre	House		Early 18th century		ST591722	1282151	Upload Photo	
Sailor's Refuge Queen Square	Bristol city centre	House		1709–1711		ST591722	1202467	Sailor's Refuge Queen Square More images	
Custom House Queen Square	Bristol city centre	Custom house		1836		ST591722	1282153	Custom House Queen Square More images	
Rotunda, bastion and connecting wall approximately 150 metres south west of Goldney House	Clifton	Wall	Batty Langley	1753–1757		ST5733772694	1202106	Upload Photo	
Redland Court	Redland	House		1732–1735		ST582749	1291739	Redland Court More images	
Royal West of England Academy	Clifton	House		1857		ST578733	1282156	Royal West of England Academy More images	
Shakespeare Public House	Bristol city centre	House		1725		ST586725	1209010	Shakespeare Public House More images	
St Bartholomew's Hospital, Christmas Street	Bristol city centre	Model dwelling		1865		ST586731	1202066	St Bartholomew's Hospital, Christmas Street More images	
Raised pavement, railings and vaults fronting Nos. 1 to 52 for approximately 330 metres	Clifton	Garage		Late 18th/early 19th century		ST5692772928	1202516	Raised pavement, railings and vaults fronting Nos. 1 to 52 for approximately 330 metres	
St George, Brandon Hill	Clifton	Church		1821–1823		ST581728	1202248	St George, Brandon Hill More images	
St Luke's Church	Brislington	Church		15th century		ST621708	1205151	St Luke's Church More images	
St Mary on the Quay	Bristol city centre	Church		1839–1843		ST586730	1052289	St Mary on the Quay More images	
St Mary the Virgin, Henbury	Henbury	Church		c. 1200		ST562788	1205113	St Mary the Virgin, Henbury More images	
St Matthias	Fishponds	College		c. 1200		ST633763	1202400	St Matthias More images	
St Michael on the Mount Without	Kingsdown	Church		15th century		ST585733	1282109	St Michael on the Mount Without More images	
St Nicholas	Bristol city centre	Church		1769		ST589729	1202553	St Nicholas More images	
St Nicholas' Almshouses	Bristol city centre	Almshouse		1652–1656		ST587727	1209635	St Nicholas' Almshouses More images	
St Peter's Church	Castle Park, Bristol	Church		15th century		ST5912273096	1282177	St Peter's Church More images	
Church of St Philip and St Jacob	Bristol city centre	Church		Early 13th century		ST594730	1218100	Church of St Philip and St Jacob More images	
St Thomas the Martyr	Bristol city centre	Church		Early 13th century		ST590728	1202562	St Thomas the Martyr More images	
St Vincent's Works	St Philip's	Works		1891		ST602725	1282118	St Vincent's Works More images	
St Werburgh's Church	St Werburghs	Church		1758		ST602725	1025007	St Werburgh's Church More images	
Statue of Edward VII	Clifton	Statue	Henry Poole	1912		ST5776073413	1292038	Statue of Edward VII More images	
Temple Church	Bristol city centre	Church		c. 12th century		ST592726	1291644	Temple Church More images	
The orangery approximately 20 metres south west of Goldney House	Clifton	Orangery		c. 1730		ST5733772694	1282328	The orangery approximately 20 metres south west of Goldney House More images	
The Old Deanery Cathedral School	College Green	House		Late 17th/early 18th century		ST5830972644	1025060	The Old Deanery Cathedral School More images	
Wall, piers and gateway Thornton Hall	Clifton	Gateway		1830		ST 57677333	1282167	Upload Photo	
Stoke House, Clifton Theological College	Stoke Bishop	House		1669		ST562756	1208857	Stoke House, Clifton Theological College More images	
The Victoria	Clifton	Manager's house		1850		ST576735	1323692	The Victoria More images	
Victoria Rooms	Clifton	Concert hall		1839–1841		ST577734	1202480	Victoria Rooms More images	
Fountains, lamps, balustrades, railings and statues to front of Victoria Rooms	Clifton	Balustrade		1912		ST577734	1218308	Fountains, lamps, balustrades, railings and statues to front of Victoria Rooms More images	
25–31 Victoria Street	Bristol city centre	Jettied house		17th century		ST591728	1291692	25–31 Victoria Street More images	
Walls, gates and railings to the front of Unitarian Chapel	Bristol city centre	Chapel	William Blackburn	1791		ST5866873294	1282213	Upload Photo	
Western College	Cotham	Theological college		1905–06		ST584739	1207773	Western College More images	
Wills Memorial Building	Clifton	Theological college		1914–1925		ST580731	1218203	Wills Memorial Building More images	
Worcester House and attached front area railings and piers	Clifton	Terrace	Charles Underwood	1851–1853		ST5722173542	1202713	Upload Photo	
Screen walls to main entrance of Arnos Vale Cemetery	Arnos Vale	Walls		1837	4 March 1977	ST6078171653	1201986	Screen walls to main entrance of Arnos Vale Cemetery More images	
Church of St Peter	Bishopsworth	Church		1842	4 March 1977	ST5705468669	1205207	Church of St Peter More images	
St Anne's Tunnel East Portal	Brislington	Tunnel	Isambard Kingdom Brunel	c. 1836 – 1840	4 March 1977	ST6251971980	1201949	Upload Photo	
St Anne's Tunnel West Portal	Brislington	Tunnel	Isambard Kingdom Brunel	c. 1836 – 1840	4 March 1977	ST6240072048	1201950	Upload Photo	
Fox's Wood Tunnel West Portal	Brislington	Tunnel	Isambard Kingdom Brunel	c. 1840	12 July 2012	ST6278871774	1409150	Upload Photo	
Cutler's Hall	Broadmead	Guildhall		16th century	8 January 1959	ST5924973322	1217854	Cutler's Hall More images	
Bakers' Hall	Broadmead	House		18th century	8 January 1959	ST5926273298	1282148	Bakers' Hall More images	
Screen walls, piers wrought iron railings and gates to Nos. 19 and 21 Merchant Street	Broadmead	Walls		Late 18th century	4 March 1977	ST5918773283	1202374	Upload Photo	
Merchant Taylors' Almshouses	Bristol city centre	Almshouses		1701	8 January 1959	ST5917373276	1025053	Merchant Taylors' Almshouses More images	
The Market	Bristol city centre	Market	Samuel Glascodine, RS Pope	18th and 19th century	8 January 1959	ST5888772951	1202292	The Market More images	
Banker's House, to rear of No. 35 Corn Street	Bristol city centre	House		c. 1760	1 November 1966	ST5874472998	1202151	Upload Photo	
No. 33 King Street	Bristol city centre	House		Mid-18th century	8 January 1959	ST5876772722	1282242	No. 33 King Street More images	
No. 35 Corn Street	Bristol city centre	House		14th and 15th centuries	1 November 1966	ST5875272986	1298787	Upload Photo	
Neptune statue, St Augustine's Quay	Bristol city centre	Statue	John Randall	1723	8 January 1959	ST5855272769	1202528	Neptune statue, St Augustine's Quay More images	
No. 56 Corn Street	Bristol city centre	House	Thomas Paty	1782	8 January 1959	ST5886573024	1202154	No. 56 Corn Street More images	
Bristol stock exchange and attached railings	Bristol city centre	Office	H Williams	1903	4 March 1977	ST5878772942	1207568	Bristol stock exchange and attached railings More images	
Bristol Commercial Rooms and attached railings	Bristol city centre	Gate	C A Busby	1810	8 January 1959	ST5879072998	1202152	Bristol Commercial Rooms and attached railings More images	
Nos. 15 to 19 Orchard Street and attached front railings	Bristol city centre	House		1721	8 January 1959	ST5845872980	1202403	Upload Photo	
Abbey House, Cathedral School	Bristol city centre	Porter's lodge		17th century	30 December 1994	ST5829772626	1202130	Abbey House, Cathedral School	
Former tramway generating station	Bristol city centre	Power station	William Curtis Green	1899	1 November 1966	ST5927872941	1282287	Former tramway generating station More images	
Nos. 13 and 14 Orchard Street and attached front area railings	Bristol city centre	House		1717–1722	8 January 1959	ST5842572949	1207768	Upload Photo	
Nos. 27, 28 and 29 Orchard Street and attached front area railings and gates	Bristol city centre	House		c. 1720	8 January 1959	ST5843172917	1202407	Upload Photo	
Nos. 25 and 26 Orchard street and attached front area railings and lamp	Bristol city centre	House	John Price	c. 1720	8 January 1959	ST5844172927	1202406	Upload Photo	

== See also ==
- Buildings and architecture of Bristol
- Grade I listed buildings in Bristol
- Grade II listed buildings in Bristol
