= Susanna Winkworth =

English translator and philanthropist

Susanna Winkworth (13 August 1820 – 25 November 1884) was an English translator and philanthropist, elder sister of translator Catherine Winkworth.

== Early life and education ==
Susanna Winkworth was born in London, the eldest daughter of silk merchant Henry Winkworth and his wife Susanna Dickenson. Henry's third daughter, Selina Mary, was the mother of Norman Collie.

Susanna was educated at home; among her tutors were prominent English Unitarians James Martineau and William Gaskell.

== Career ==
=== Writer ===
Winkworth translated the memoir and essays of German theologian Barthold Georg Niebuhr, in Life and Letters (1851 and 1852). She followed with more German religious literature, with translations of the Theologia Germanica (1854) and twenty-five sermons of medieval mystic Johannes Tauler (1858). She completed an unfinished biography of Martin Luther by Julius Hare (1855), and collaborated with her sister on Signs of the Times (1856). Another translation, German Love, from the Papers of an Alien (1858) was based on the writings of Max Müller. Her last notable publications were a translation of Bunsen's God in History (1868–1870), and an 1883 memorial edition of her sister's writings, after Catherine Winkworth's death in 1878.

=== Philanthropy ===
Winkworth took an interest in urban life in Bristol, while living with her family at Clifton. She invested in housing at Dowry Square, built more units for low-income renters at Jacob's Well, and managed a sanitary mission. Susanna Winkworth also took a turn as governor of The Red Maids' School, and served on the board of governors of The Cheltenham Ladies' College.

She died in 1884, age 64, and her remains were buried in the St. John's churchyard in Clifton. In the year 2000 a blue plaque was installed, marking the home of Catherine and Susanna Winkworth in Cornwallis Crescent, Bristol.
