= Buckingham Baptist Chapel =

Church in Bristol, England

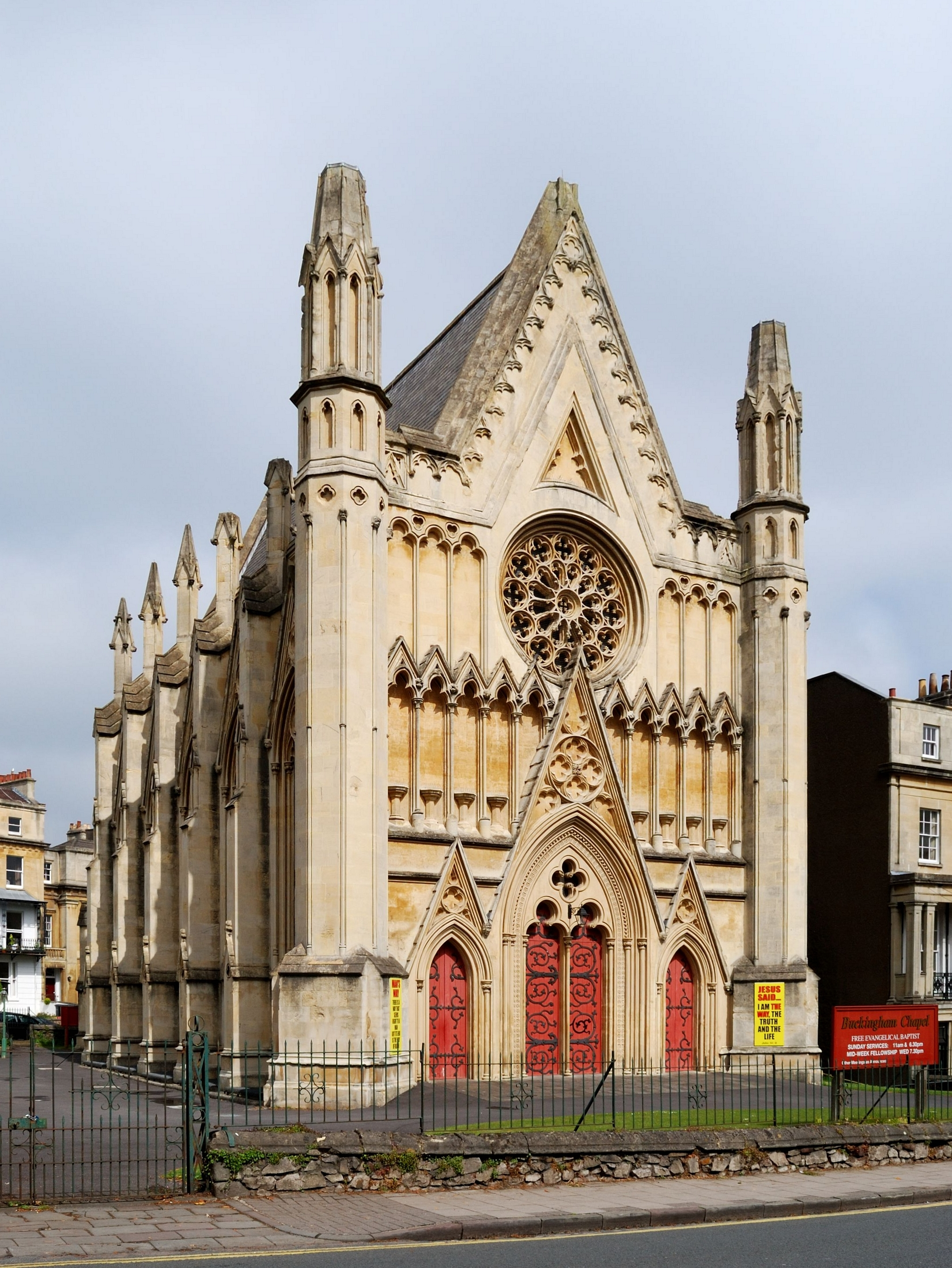

- Location within Bristol

General information
- Architectural style: Gothic Revival
- Location: Bristol, England
- Coordinates: 51.456414°N 2.614046°W
- Completed: 1842

Design and construction
- Architect: Richard Shackleton Pope

Buckingham Baptist Chapel is a Gothic Revival church in Queens Road, Clifton, Bristol, England.

== History ==
The church was built in 1842 to the designs of Richard Shackleton Pope. It is one of the earliest Baptist chapels built in this style.

The chapel describes itself as 'independent evangelical baptist'. It is a former member of the Baptist Union, which it left on 7 April 1972 (hence 'independent') due to a membership decision based on 'lack of clarity in its teachings on the deity of Christ'.

The church has been led by Pastor Oliver Gross since 1 December 2015. The church currently has two other elders and two deacons, with varying roles in the upkeep of the church and its ministries, in addition to an associate member involved mainly in preaching and outreach ministries, particularly with Romanian and Roma communities in Bristol.

The church has several main meetings per week; two Sunday services and a midweek prayer and Bible study meeting on Wednesdays. Other meetings include a prayer meeting on the first Friday evening of each month and a ladies' meeting every other Tuesday.

The church has several outreach ministries such as a Sunday school held during the morning service every week, Tiger Tots (a parent and toddler group) held on Fridays during school term-time, a club for teenagers called Lighthouse that is also held on term-time Fridays, and a monthly young adults group on a Saturday evening.

There are several yearly events run by the church, such as a church party, missionary Sunday, anniversary service, Christmas carol singing and a Bonfire Night party held at the home of some church members.

It has been designated by English Heritage as a Grade II listed building.

== See also ==
- Churches in Bristol
- Grade II* listed buildings in Bristol
