= Merchant Venturers Almshouses =

Listed building in Bristol, England

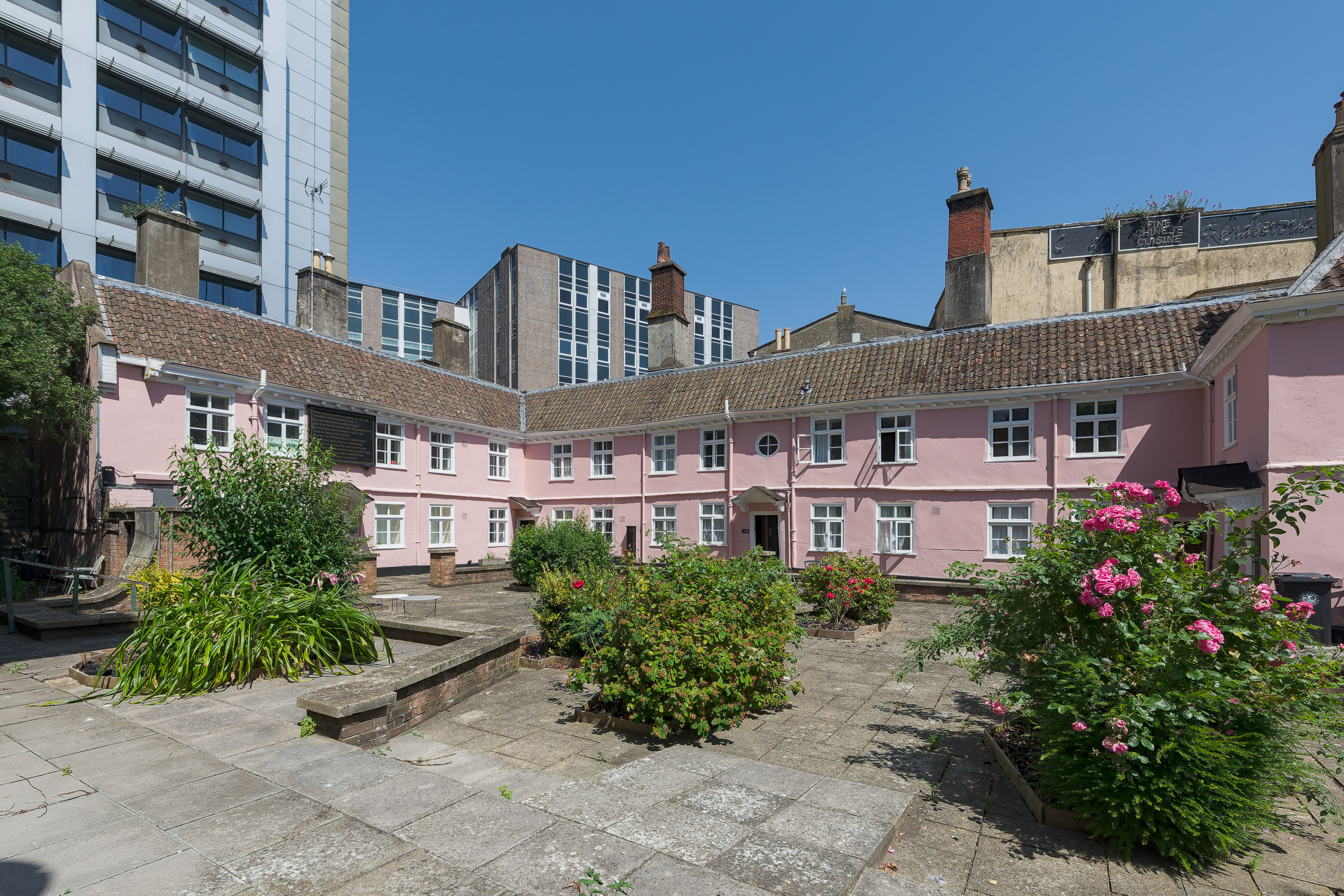

- Location within Bristol

General information
- Architectural style: Georgian
- Location: King Street, Bristol, England
- Coordinates: 51.452220°N 2.595026°W
- Completed: 1696
- Client: Society of Merchant Venturers

Listed Building – Grade II*
- Official name: Merchant Venturer's Almshouses
- Designated: 8 January 1959
- Reference no.: 1202333

Merchant Venturers Almshouses (grid reference ST587727) is a historic building on King Street in Bristol, England. It has been designated as a Grade II* listed building.

== History ==
It was built around 1696 by the Society of Merchant Venturers for convalescent and old sailors to see out their days, often after fever or blindness during service on the ships of the Bristol slave trade. It is now private accommodation, apartments 1 to 10.

Arms of the Merchant Venturers on the King Street elevation

They are built of Pennant stone in an early Georgian style. The pantile hipped roof has lateral and ridge stacks. There is an oculus over the central doorway, however most of the windows are 20th-century replacements. It has scroll-bracketed door canopies at irregular angles. The Society of Merchant Venturers arms are displayed on the side of the building fronting on to Kings Street.

The almshouses were originally built around a quadrangle however bombing and road realignment mean that it is now left with only three sides. It used to be accompanied by the Merchants Hall but this was destroyed in the Bristol Blitz of World War II.

In 2014 a long lease for the almshouses was signed for £620,000.

The plaque on the wall is a poem:
"Freed from all storms the tempest and the rage
Of billows, here we spend our age.
Our weather beaten vessels here repair
And from the Merchants' kind and generous care
Find harbour here; no more we put to sea
Until we launch into Eternity.
And lest our Widows whom we leave behind
Should want relief, they too a shelter find.
Thus all our anxious cares and sorrows cease
Whilst our kind Guardians turn our toils to ease.
May they be with an endless Sabbath blest
Who have afforded unto us this rest."

== Archives ==
Records of Merchant Venturers' Almshouse are held at Bristol Archives (Ref. SMV/4/1) (online catalogue).

== See also ==
- Grade II* listed buildings in Bristol
- List of British almshouses
