= John Eveleigh (architect) =

English surveyor and architect

John Eveleigh was an English surveyor and architect in Bath.

He began his practice in Bath in the 1780s, but went bankrupt after the failure of the Bath City Bank and moved to Plymouth.

== List of works ==
- Camden Crescent, Bath (1788)
- 32-44 Caledonia Place, Bristol (1788)
- Summer Hill Place, Sion Hill, Bath (1789)
- Beaufort Buildings, London Road, Bath (1790)
- St Catherine's Hermitage, Lansdown, Bath (1791)
- Grosvenor Place, Bath (1791)
- Somerset Place, Bath (1791)
- Lambridge Place, Bath (1792)
- Plymouth Guildhall (1800)
