= Kingsley Hall, Bristol =

Listed building in Bristol, England

Kingsley Hall
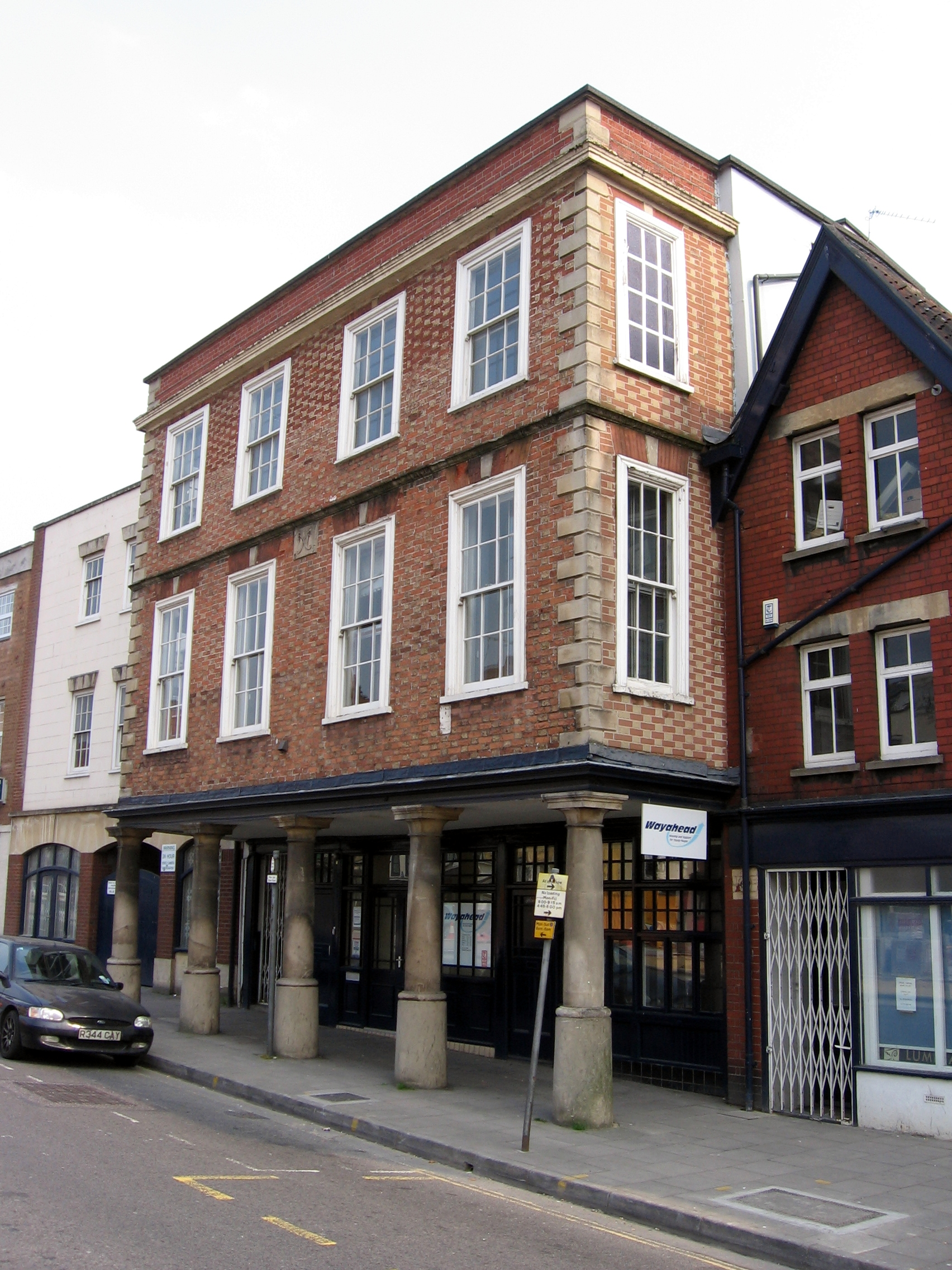
- The building in 2007

- Location within Bristol

General information
- Architectural style: Georgian
- Location: Old Market, Bristol, England
- Coordinates: 51.455919°N 2.581369°W
- Year built: 1706
- Renovated: Late 19th century

Listed Building – Grade II*
- Official name: Kingsley Hall
- Designated: 8 January 1959
- Reference no.: 1207565

Kingsley Hall (grid reference ST596731) is at 59 Old Market Street in Old Market, Bristol, England.

The hall was built as a private house in 1706 and restored in the late 19th century for use as a political club and office premises. It was originally occupied by the East Bristol Conservative Party. In 1911 it became the Bristol headquarters of the Independent Labour Party who renamed it in honour of the Christian Socialist Charles Kingsley.

In January 1959, it was designated as a Grade II* listed building.

It is now used as offices by 1625 Independent People, a charity housing young people.

In January 2025, the building was awarded £4.7 million in funding to renovate it into a community hub with accommodation, a "skills kitchen", and a café to help young people who have experienced homelessness or been in care build skills, improve their wellbeing, and access training and jobs.

== See also ==
- Grade II* listed buildings in Bristol
