= Western College, Bristol =

Listed building in Bristol, England

Western College
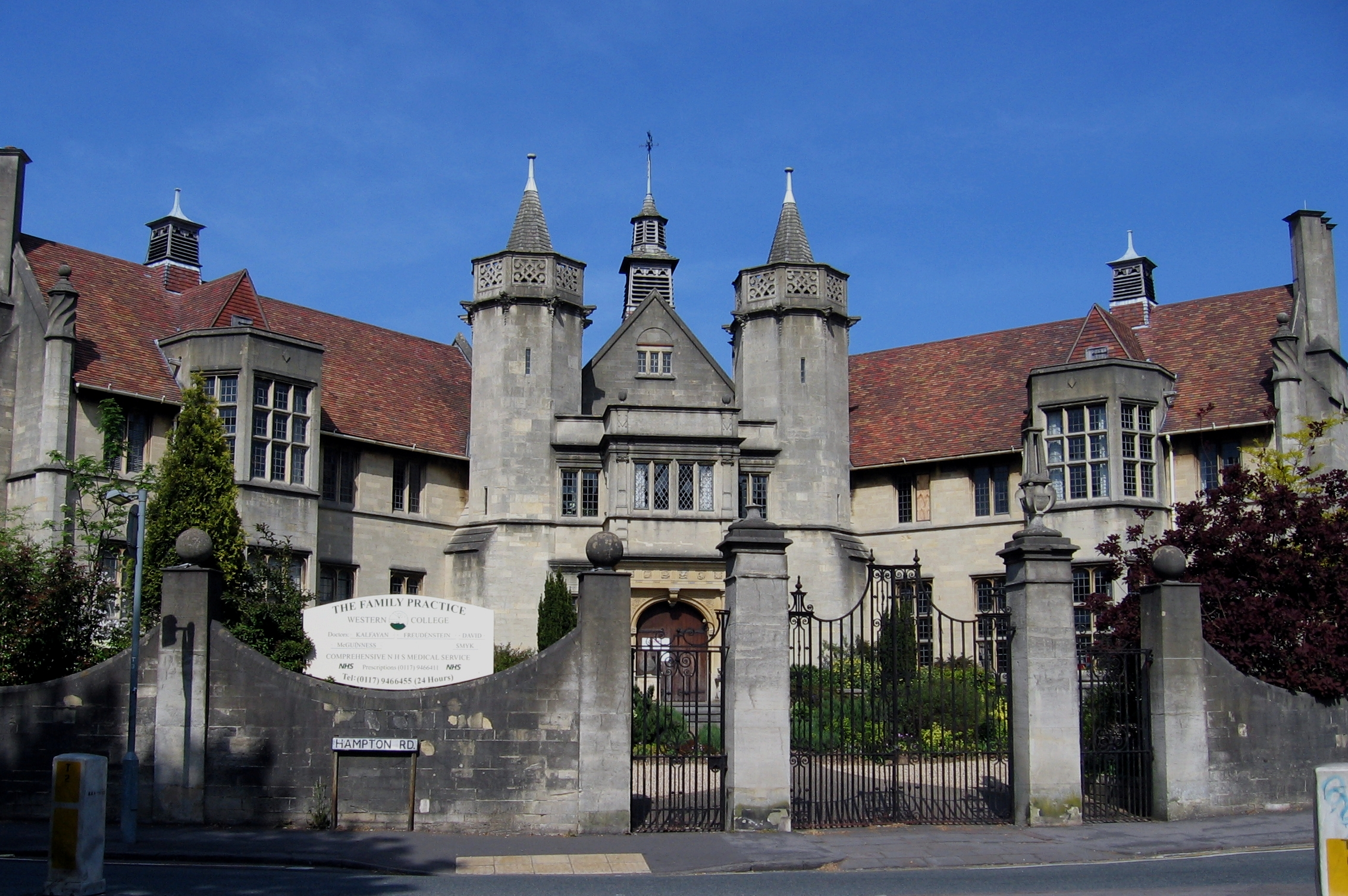
- Western College, Bristol

- Location within Bristol

General information
- Location: Bristol, England
- Coordinates: 51.4627°N 2.6031°W
- Opened: 27 September 1906

Design and construction
- Architect: Henry Dare Bryan

Listed Building – Grade II*
- Official name: Western House
- Designated: 1 November 1966
- Reference no.: 1207773

Western College, in Bristol, England, opened on 27 September 1906 as a theological college for the Congregational Union of England and Wales.

The building was designed by the Bristol architect Henry Dare Bryan, and given Grade II* listed status in 1966. It closed in 1968, and the building was subsequently used as the headquarters of the Southern Universities Joint Examination Board, and since 1993 as a medical practice.

== Gallery ==
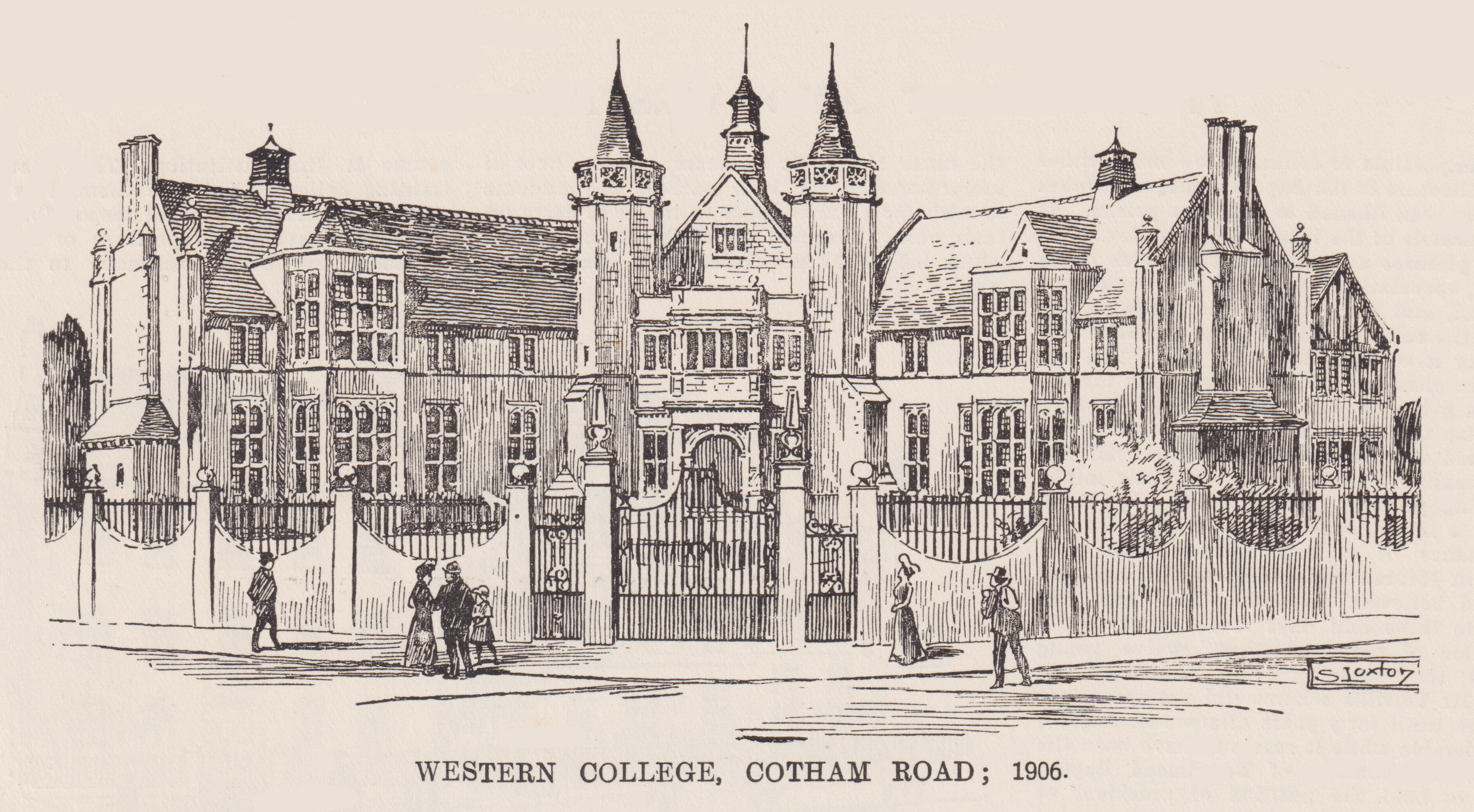
Western College, Bristol, 1906

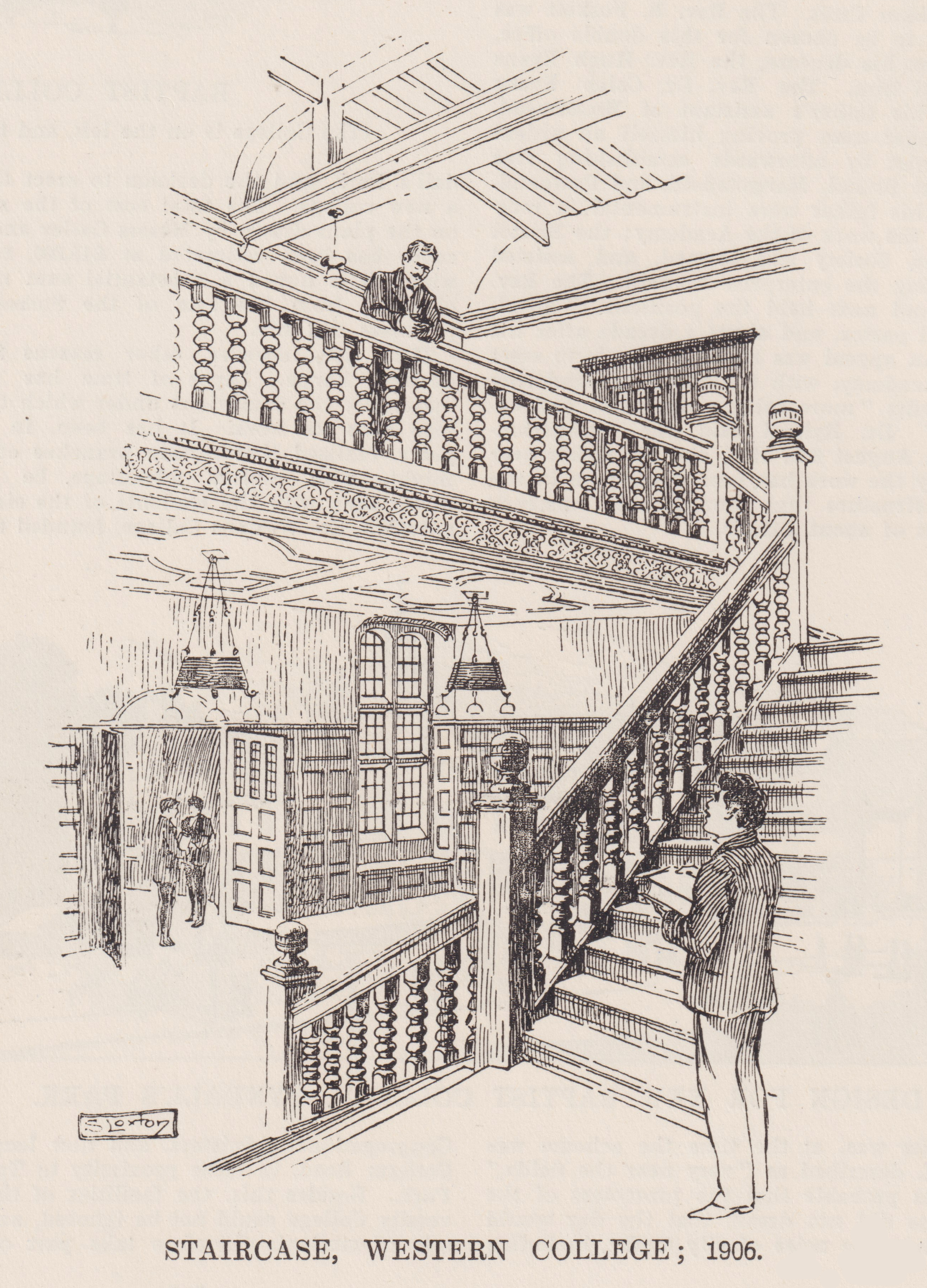
Staircase in Western College, 1906

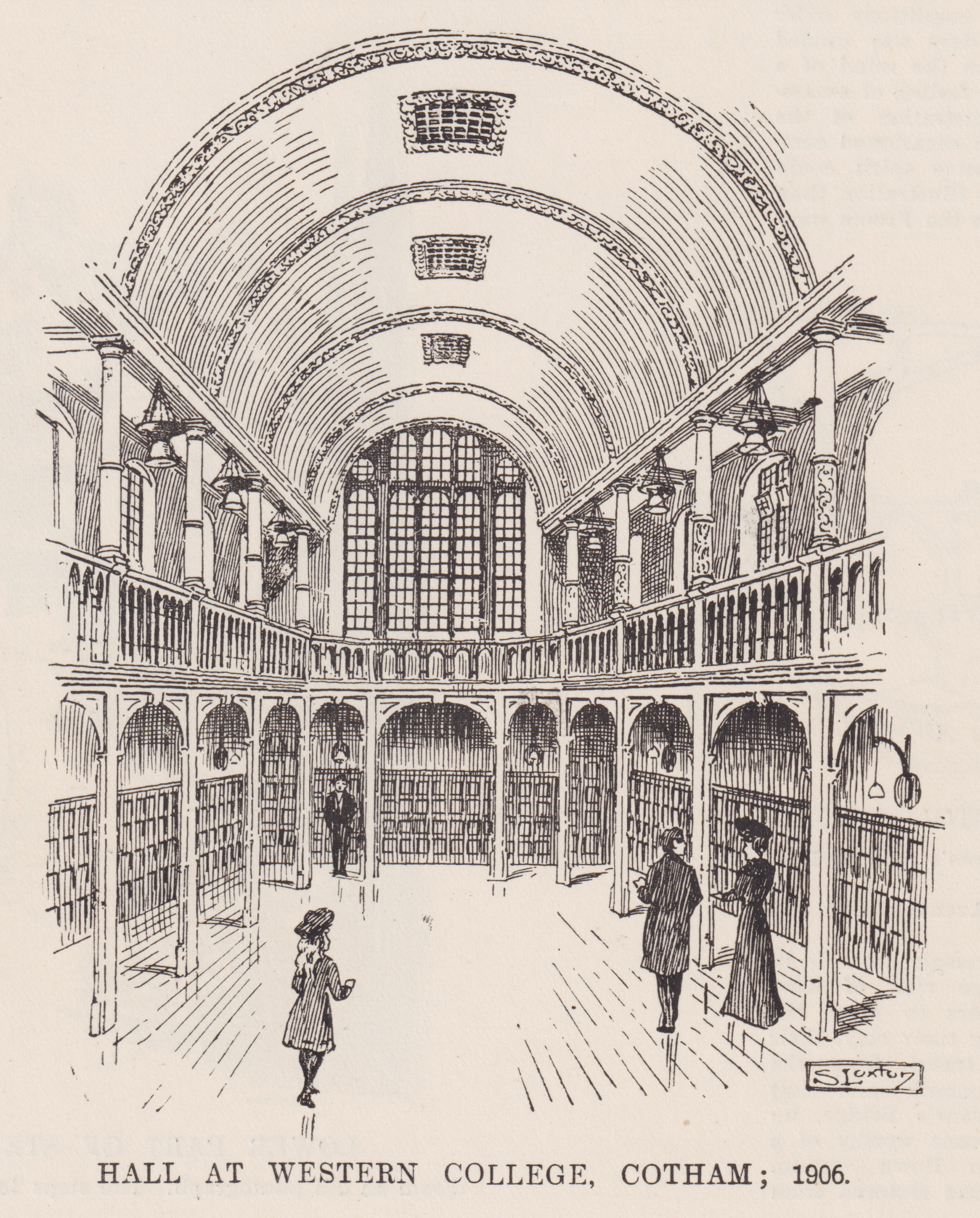
Western College Hall, Bristol, 1906

== See also ==
- Grade II* listed buildings in Bristol
