= The Shakespeare, Bristol =

Listed pub in Bristol, England

The Shakespeare
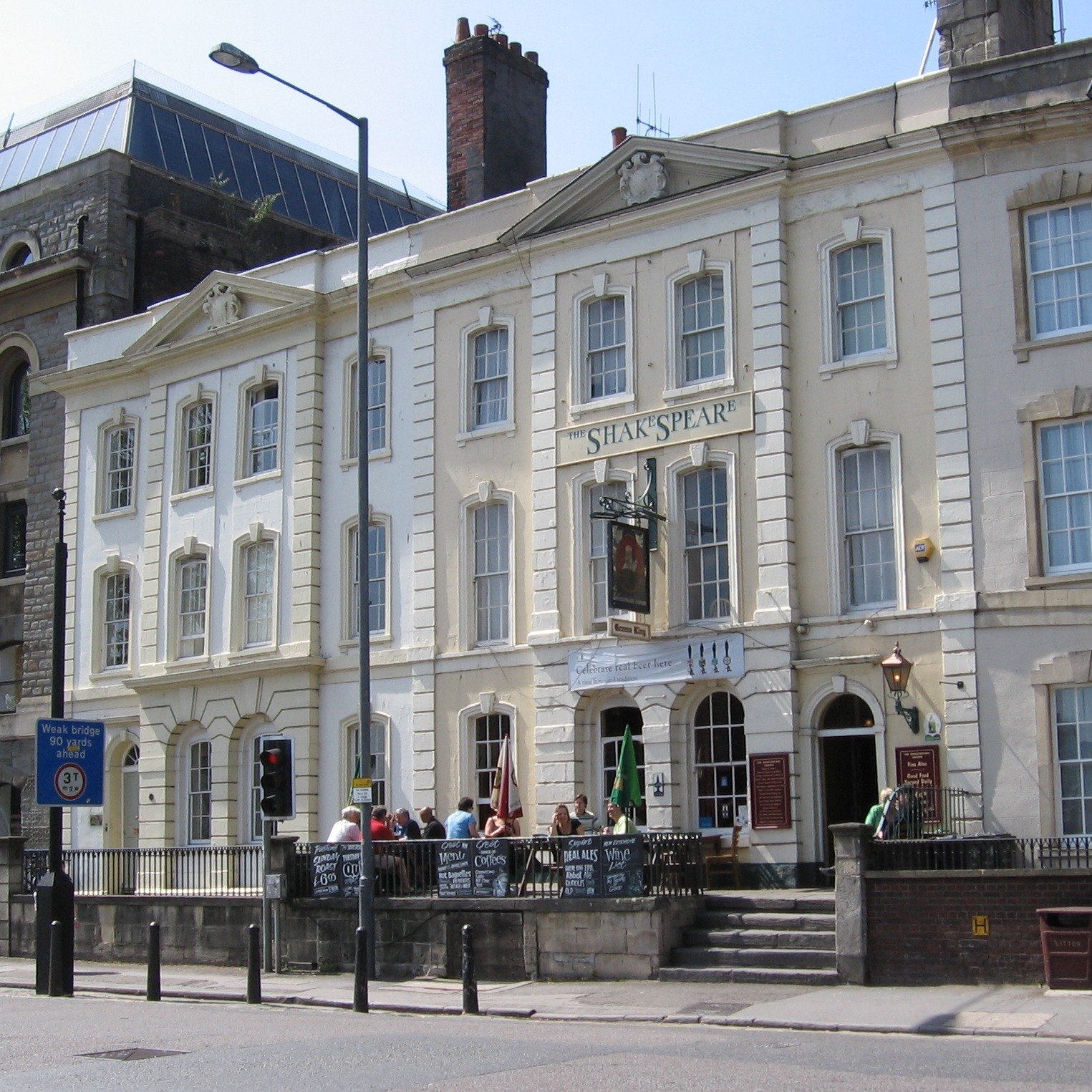
- The Shakespeare in 2007

- Location within Bristol

General information
- Architectural style: Georgian
- Location: Prince Street, Bristol, England
- Coordinates: 51.45°N 2.5972°W
- Year built: 1725

Design and construction
- Architect: John Strahan

Listed Building – Grade II*
- Official name: The Shakespeare Public House
- Designated: 8 January 1959
- Reference no.: 1209010

The Shakespeare is a historic pub on Prince Street in Bristol, England. Built in 1725 by the Bristol builder John Strahan as a pair of attached Georgian-style houses, it was converted into a pub in 1777 at which time it supplied refreshment to dock workers at the adjoining port. It has been a Grade II* listed building since 1959.

== History ==
Prince Street in Bristol was named after Prince George of Denmark, who was the husband of Queen Anne and lived from 1653 to 1708. The public house takes its name from the nearby Theatre Royal home of the Bristol Old Vic.

The building dates from 1725 and was built by John Strahan as a pair of attached Georgian houses that would have been occupied by merchants. No. 68 Prince Street was commissioned by John Hobbs and bears a pediment carved with two falcons or 'hobbies' reminding posterity of the origin of the house. In 1777 it was converted into a public house which was patronised by warehousemen and dockworkers at the nearby port.

== The building ==
The Shakespeare was designated as a Grade II* listed building on 8 January 1959, being an example of a pair of attached merchant's houses in the Georgian style. The construction is of limestone ashlar, with brick chimney stacks and party wall, and a pantile-covered roof. The houses have symmetrical fronts and are two rooms deep. Each house has three storeys, the upper two each having four windows. The arched doors are on the outer edges of the lower storey, with three windows towards the centre of the building. The central two windows on the ground floor of each house have semi-circular arches and are pedimented and set forwards. There is a frieze, cornice and parapet. The interior of No. 68 Prince Street is well preserved and has a panelled entrance hall and an elliptical arch in a framed wall separating the other ground floor rooms, which are also panelled. There is a fine curved, mahogany staircase.

== See also ==
- Grade II* listed buildings in Bristol
