= George Tully (architect) =

English carpenter and architect (died 1770)

George Tully (died 1770) was a carpenter and surveyor in Bristol, England.

Born in Surrey, he was apprenticed to carpenters in Bristol and became a burgess in 1715. He died in 1770.

Areas of Bristol laid out to his plans include Dowry Square and Chapel Row (1720), King Square (c.1740), Park Street (1758) and Brunswick Square (1766). His building designs include Dowry Chapel (1746), the Friends' Meeting House (1747), Infirmary (1749) and Wesley's Chapel in Broadmead.
