= Church of Holy Trinity, Hotwells =

Anglican church in Bristol, England

Church of Holy Trinity
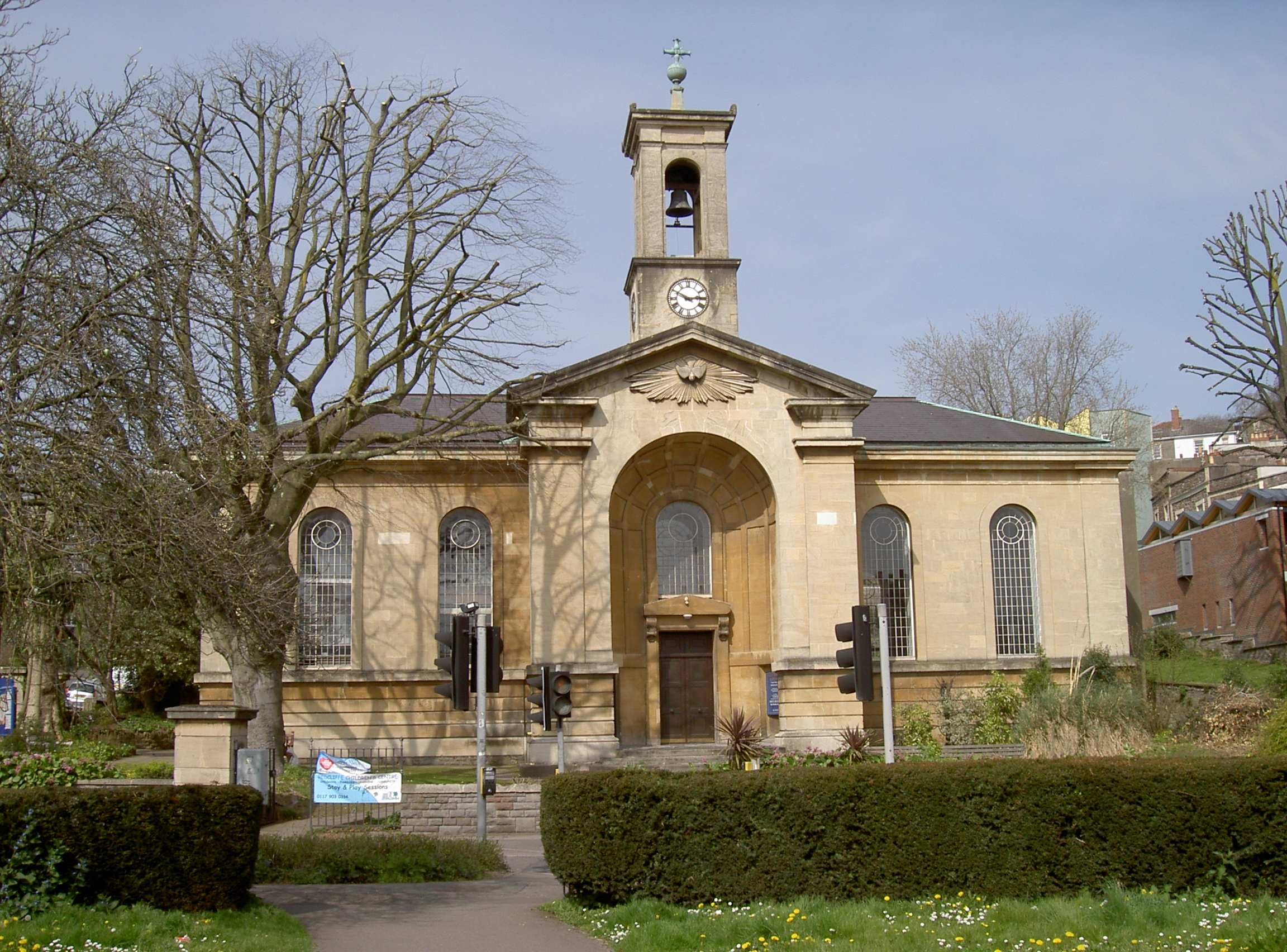

- Location within Bristol

General information
- Architectural style: Neoclassical
- Location: Bristol, England
- Coordinates: 51.4498°N 2.6187°W
- Completed: 1829

Design and construction
- Architect: Charles Robert Cockerell

Church of Holy Trinity is an Anglican church in Hotwells, Bristol, England. It has been designated as a grade II* listed building.

== History ==
The church was built in 1829 by Charles Robert Cockerell with an interior by T Burrough and consecrated on 10 November 1830.

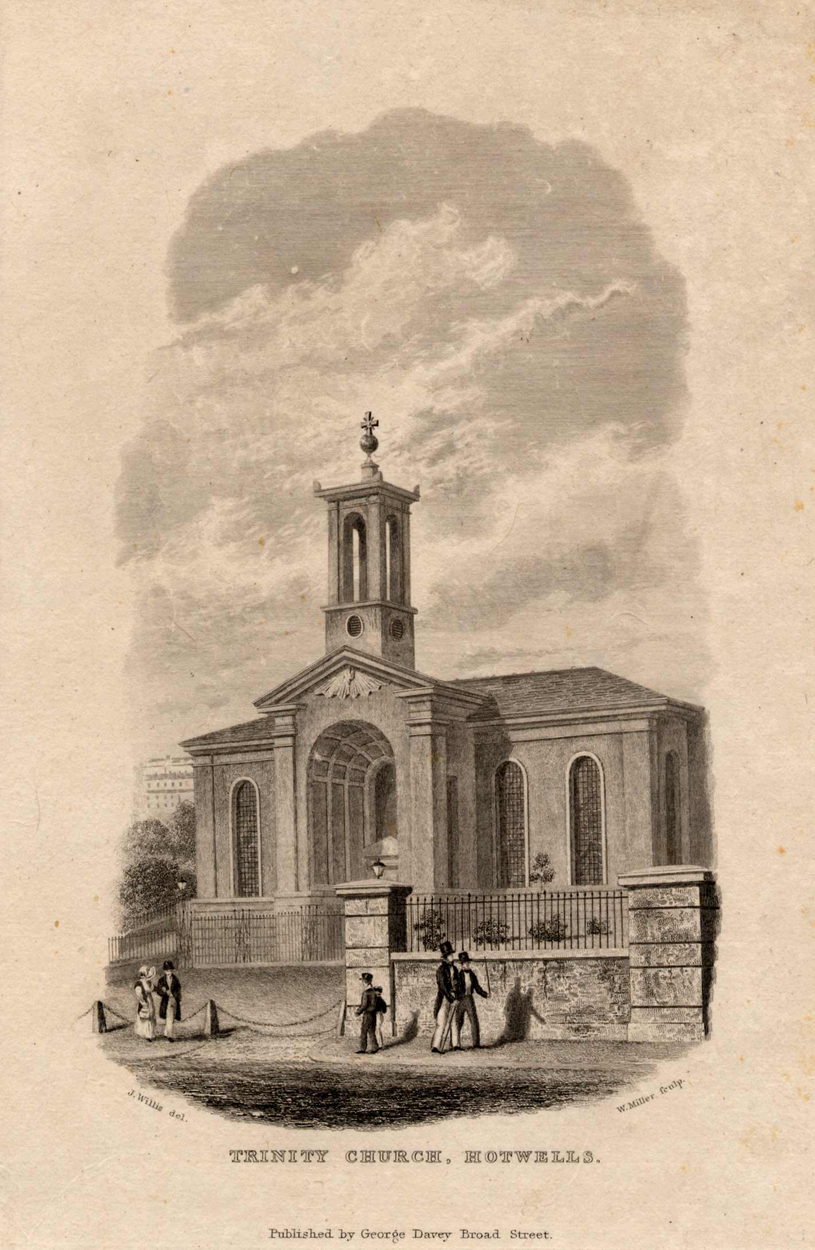
Engraved print of Holy Trinity church, Hotwells, Bristol, UK, from c.1838, looking from the south. The street scene shows five people walking along the front of the church.

The interior forms a rectangle about 85 by 60 feet (26 by 18 m) and Cockerell used Wren's method of space division based on eight structural columns. The church was completely rebuilt after being gutted during the Bristol Blitz of World War II. Nothing survives of the original cruciform, galleried interior, except the use of a shallow glazed dome. The south front of the building which faces the main A4 road has a symmetrical design of five round arched windows. There is a central porch with Doric pilasters.

Since the rebuilding in the 1950s a kitchen, toilets and office space have been added. In 2004 the roof was repaired and asbestos removed from the dome. The pews can be moved for concerts and special services.

The parish and benefice is part of the Diocese of Bristol.

== Archives ==
Parish records of Holy Trinity church, Hotwells, Bristol are held at Bristol Archives (Ref. P.HTC) (online catalogue) including baptism and marriage registers. The archive also includes records of the incumbent, churchwardens, parochial church council, schools and vestry, plus plans and photographs.

== See also ==
- Churches in Bristol
- Grade II* listed buildings in Bristol
