= King William Ale House =

Pub in Bristol, England

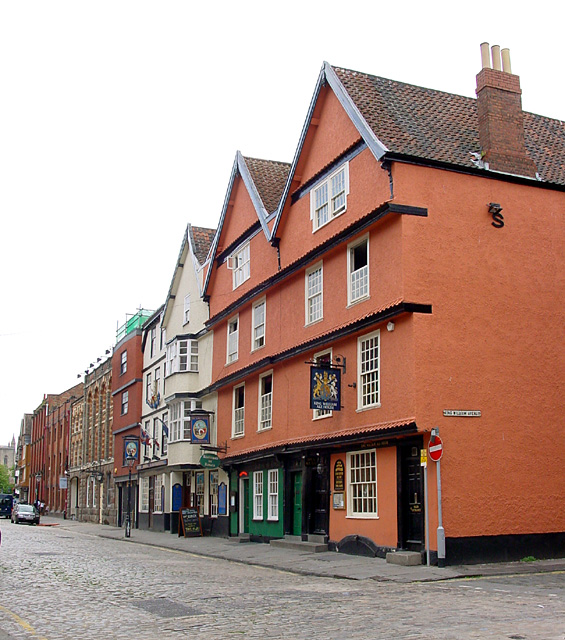
- King William Ale House

- Location within Bristol

General information
- Location: King Street, Bristol, England
- Coordinates: 51.45170°N 2.59490°W
- Year built: 1670

Listed Building – Grade II*
- Official name: King William and Naval Volunteer Public Houses
- Designated: 8 January 1959
- Reference no.: 1292605

The King William Ale House is a historic public house situated on King Street in Bristol, England. It dates from 1670 and was originally part of a row of three houses. The three have been designated by English Heritage as a Grade II* listed building since 8 January 1959. It includes a mixture of 17th-century and 18th-century features, is terracotta coloured, but currently serves as a public house owned and operated by Samuel Smith Old Brewery.

== History ==
The King William Ale House stands as part of a group of three houses, which were built in approximately 1670; originally built as a refuge for poor women, the buildings were later converted into public houses. The three buildings were designated as a Grade II* listed building on 8 January 1959, and currently include two public houses, the King William Ale House as well as The Famous Royal Navy Volunteer, with a restaurant between them.

The building is timber-framed, with brick stacks; the front of the building is gabled with three jettied floors. It has a single-storey wing to the back block on Little King Street, which also dates to the 17th century. The sash windows of the building are in an 18th-century style, but were restored in the late 20th century. The King Street entrance includes an 18th-century shop front, with a 17th-century door frame.

== Present usage ==
The King William Ale House is owned and operated by Samuel Smith Old Brewery. It has two entrances, one on King Street, the other on Little King Street. Inside there is a stone fireplace and a number of seating booths. The pub also has sufficient space for pool tables. The draught ales are kept in kegs rather than casks.

== See also ==
- Grade II* listed buildings in Bristol
