= The Clifton Club =

Private members club in Bristol, England

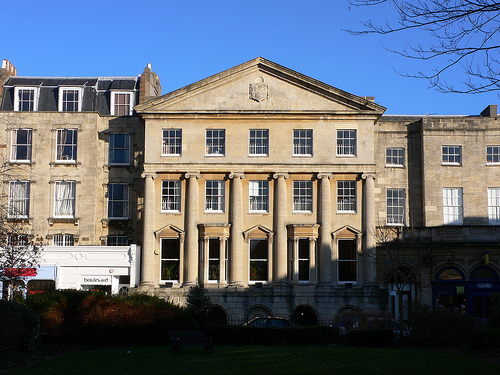
- The Club's exterior

- Location within Bristol

General information
- Location: 22 The Mall, Clifton, Bristol BS8 4DS, United Kingdom, Bristol, England
- Coordinates: 51.4552°N 2.6208°W

Design and construction
- Designations

Listed Building – Grade II*
- Official name: The Clifton Club
- Designated: 8 January 1959
- Reference no.: 1292433

Website
- www.thecliftonclub.co.uk

The Clifton Club is a traditional private members club in Bristol, England, founded in 1818 as a meeting place for the gentlemen of the prosperous port of Bristol.

== History ==
The club was founded in Clifton, an affluent suburb of Bristol, in 1818 by a host of local gentlemen. It is therefore one of the earliest remaining such clubs in the country: only Brooks's, White's, Boodle's, the Royal Thames Yacht Club, Marylebone Cricket Club, and the Liverpool Athenaeum are older. The meeting held to discuss the club's founding was held in what was then the Clifton Hotel – which subsequently became the club's current home. The club originally had premises in Birdcage Walk. After several years the club's use had dwindled and the decision was taken to disband. In 1850 several of the members of the original club resurrected the club at new premises.

== Archives ==
Records of the Clifton Club are held at Bristol Archives (Ref. 35716) (online catalogue).

== Membership ==
The Clifton Club has for over 190 years been one of the most socially exclusive organisations in Bristol. Membership must be gained on the invitation and recommendation of at least two members of good standing who have each known the candidate for at least three years. Historically the club's membership has included the heads of major Bristol business, local landed gentry, and the higher echelons of the professions. The club has a long and well documented link with the Society of Merchant Venturers; to this day many members of the society are also members of the Clifton Club. Other Bristol institutions whose memberships overlap with that of the club include the Bristol Savages and the Antient Society of St Stephen's Ringers.

The club has reciprocal arrangements with a number of clubs around the world of a similarly exclusive nature, including the Travellers Club and the Lansdowne Club in London, The Liverpool Athenaeum, The Royal Scots Club in Edinburgh, Western Club in Glasgow, Phyllis Court in Henley-on-Thames, the Royal Automobile Club of Australia, Union Club of British Columbia and The Ontario Club in Canada, The Cape Town Club and Durban Club in South Africa, The Capital Club in Cairo, the University Club of San Francisco, and The Cornell Club in New York.

For the first 188 years of its existence, membership of the club was restricted to men only. In 2006 the members, in a move which caused a degree of controversy amongst the membership, voted to allow women to become full members of the club.

== Premises and facilities ==
The Clifton Club's premises stand at 22 The Mall, Clifton, Bristol. Originally built in 1806-09 as the Clifton Assembly Rooms and Hotel, the club purchased the building in the mid-19th century. It was designed by Francis Greenway, later held in Newgate prison on charges of forgery and transported to Australia where he became famous as the father of Australian architecture, and is the only remaining building of his design in the United Kingdom. It is a Grade II* listed building.

The building has an imposing three-storey stone facade, and offers members facilities including a salon/drawing room which also contains the main bar, dining room, committee room, bridge room, and snooker room. The club also owns much of the property surrounding the club.

== See also ==
- Grade II* listed buildings in Bristol
