= Somerset Place, Bath =

Somerset Place

- Location within Somerset
- 51°23′35″N 2°22′09″W
- Location: Bath, Somerset, England

History
- Built: 1790-1820

Site notes
- Architect: John Eveleigh

Listed Building – Grade I
- Official name: Nos 5 to 20 (consec) Somerset Place
- Designated: 12 June 1950
- Reference no.: 1394986

Somerset Place is a Georgian Grade I listed crescent in Bath, England. The facades were designed by the architect John Eveleigh, who went bankrupt during the creation of the building, which started in 1790 but was not completed until the 1820s.

In 1784 Thomas Paine purchased an area of pasture including Great Lydes to build houses overlooking Bath, although there is evidence of Iron Age and Roman settlement on the area. Twenty houses were originally planned, but numbers 1 to 4 were not built.

Some of the crescent was destroyed during the Second World War and rebuilt as student accommodation in the 1950s and 1960s for Bath College of Domestic Science. It used to form part of the campus of Bath College, but has since been sold. It was used for student accommodation and the Bath Spa University English Language Programme.

In the 2010s a major redevelopment of the western end of the terrace took place, including the construction of No. 4.
