= Sailors Refuge, Bristol =

Listed building in Bristol, England

Sailors Refuge
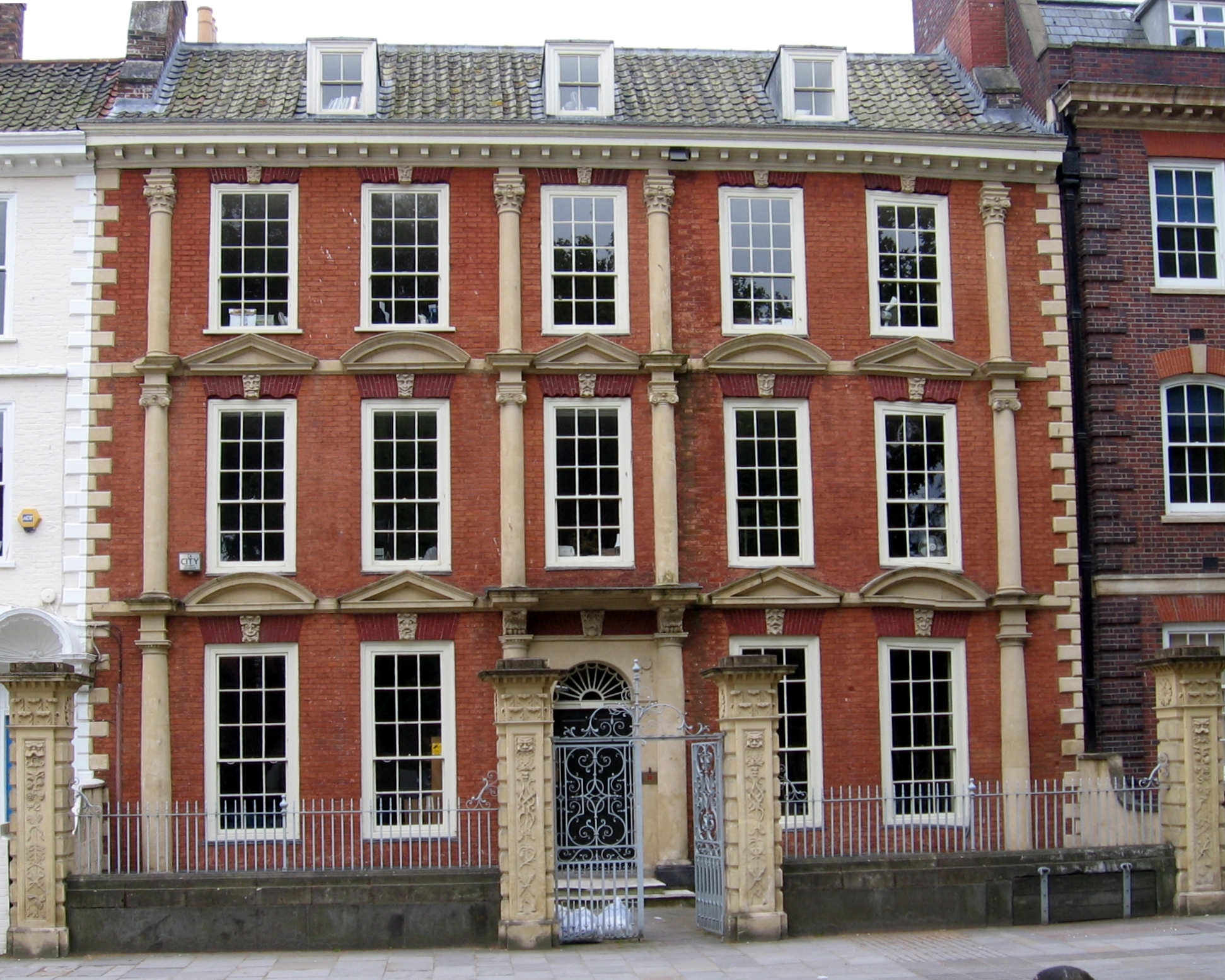
- Sailors Refuge in 2007

- Location within Bristol

General information
- Architectural style: Early Georgian
- Location: Bristol, England
- Coordinates: 51.449674°N 2.593803°W
- Construction started: 1709
- Completed: 1711

Listed Building – Grade II*
- Official name: 29 Queen Square
- Designated: 8 January 1959
- Reference no.: 1202467

The Sailors Refuge is a historic house situated at 27–29 Queen Square in Bristol, England.

It dates from 1709–11 and is one of the few remaining houses from the original construction of the square. It was one of the architecturally richer houses, and provides an example of what the more demanding segment of houseowners required.

It is built in an early Georgian naive Palladian style. The classical orders on the facade, though they are conventionally ordered from bottom to top, in the sequence Doric, Ionic, Corinthian, are placed so naively that they have no architectural relationship to the pediments over the windows or the cornice. The lack of any visible support for the window pediments, in the form of columns or projecting architraves, is similarly naive, and not in accord with proper architectural usage.

It has been designated by English Heritage as a Grade II* listed building.

Until 2021 it served as the regional office for Historic England and English Heritage in the South West.

== See also ==
- Grade II* listed buildings in Bristol
