= Hydraulic engine house, Bristol Harbour =

Engine house in Bristol, England

Hydraulic engine house
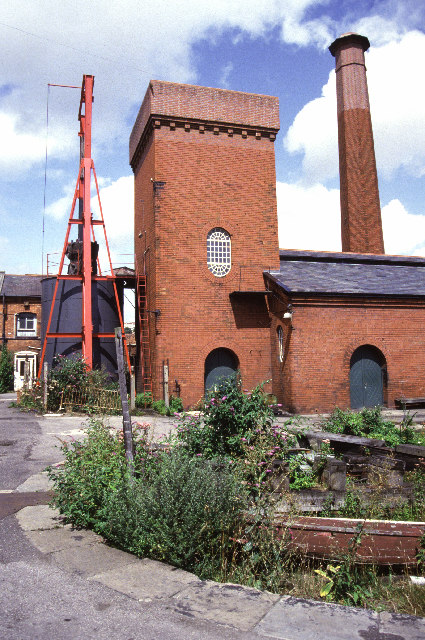

- Location within Bristol

General information
- Location: Bristol Harbour, Bristol, England
- Coordinates: 51.4469°N 2.6183°W
- Year built: 1888

Listed Building – Grade II*
- Official name: Hydraulic engine house
- Designated: 18 February 1972
- Reference no.: 1202648

The Hydraulic engine house is part of the "Underfall Yard" in Bristol Harbour in Bristol, England.

The octagonal brick and terracotta chimney of the engine house dates from 1888, and is Grade II* listed, as is the hydraulic engine house itself. It replaced the original pumping house which is now The Pump House public house. It is built of red brick with a slate roof and originally contained two steam engines made by the Worthington Corporation. These were compound surface condensing cylinders of 17.5 inches (440 mm) diameter. These were replaced in 1907 by the current machines from Fullerton, Hodgart and Barclay of Paisley. It powered the docks' hydraulic system of cranes, bridges and locks until 2010.

Water is pumped from the harbour to a header tank and then fed by gravity to the high pressure pumps, where it is pressurised thence raising the external hydraulic accumulator. This stores the hydraulic energy ensuring a smooth delivery of pressure and meaning that the pumps do not need to be running the whole time nor be capable of supplying the instantaneous peak demands. The working pressure is 750 lbs/square inch. The external accumulator was added about 1954 when the original inside the building's tower became difficult to service (but it remains in place). The building originally contained a pair of steam powered pumps however these were replaced with three electrically driven ones in 1907. The engine house provided the power for equipment such as the lock gates and cranes until 2010.

The visitor centre in the hydraulic power house opened in time for Easter 2016.

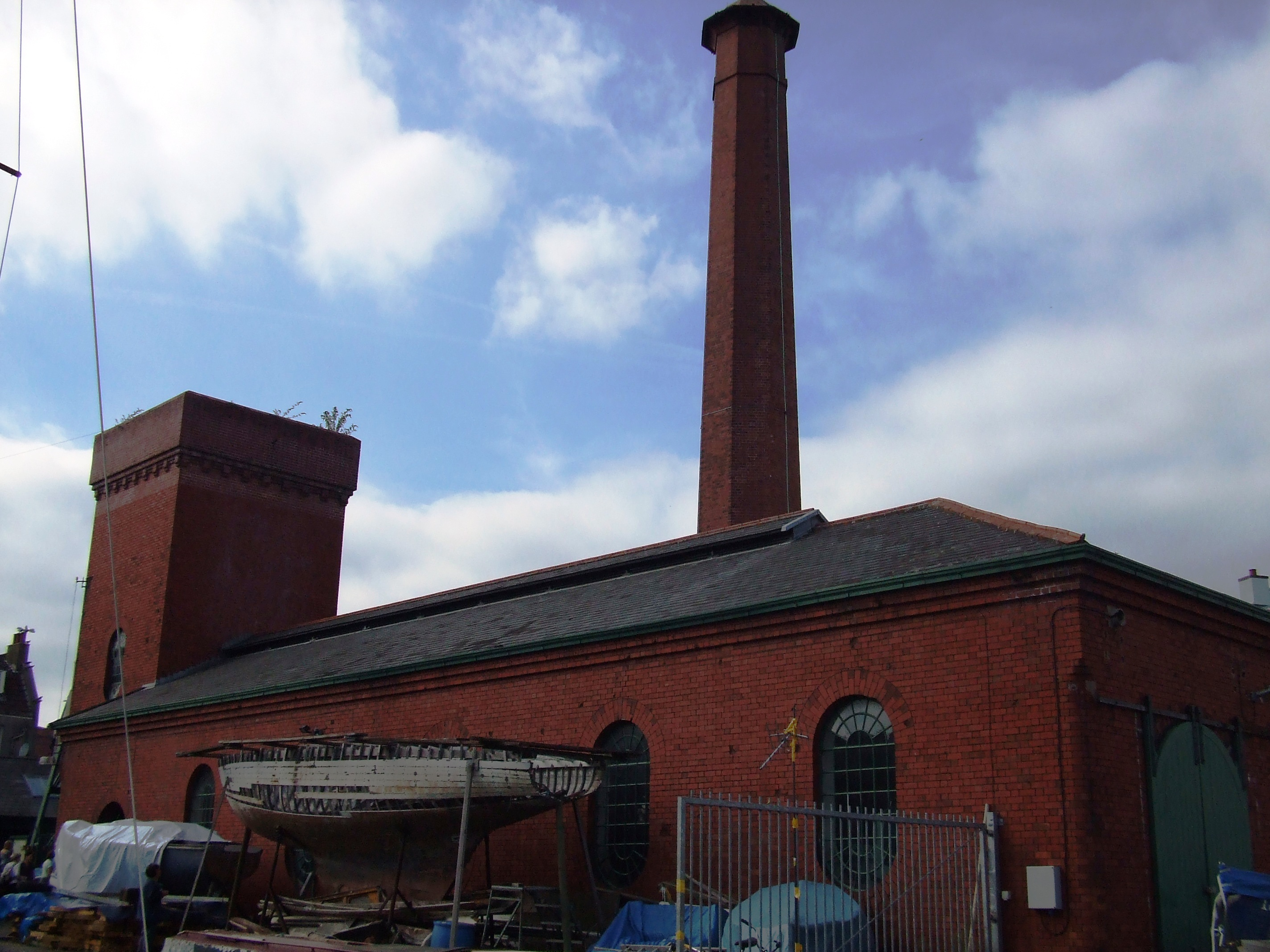

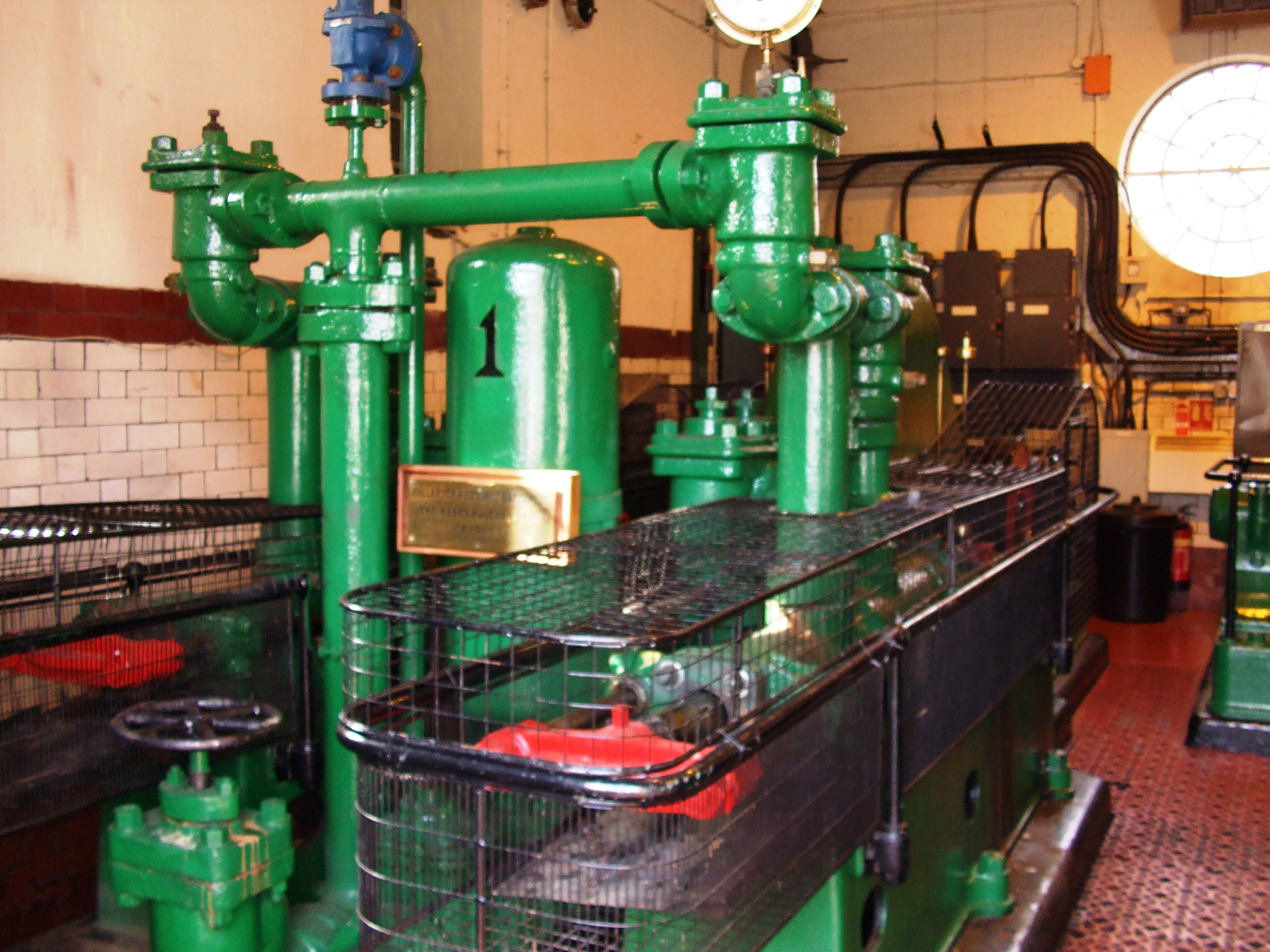
Fullerton, Hodgart and Barclay engine

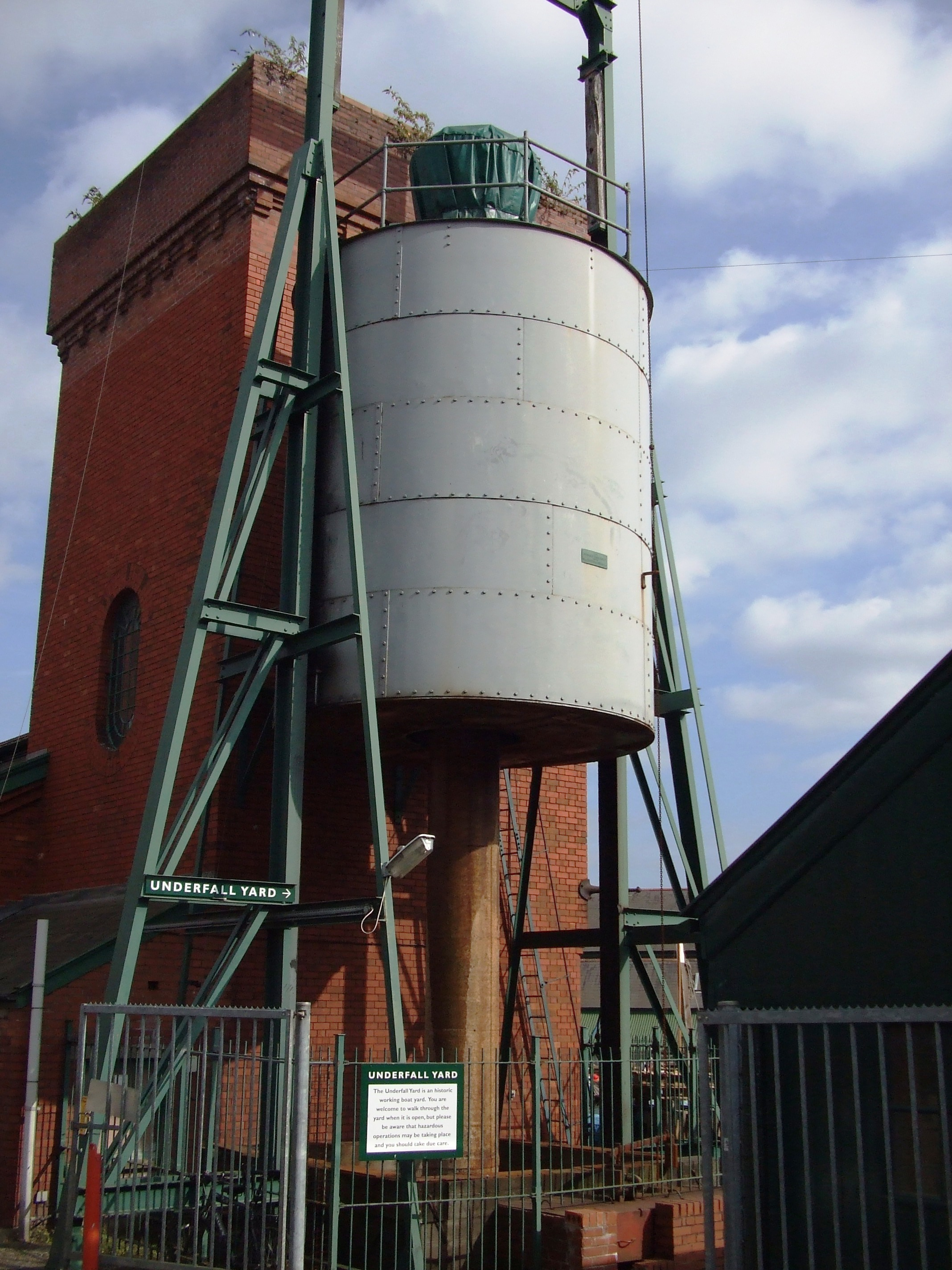
External Hydraulic accumulator

== See also ==
- Grade II* listed buildings in Bristol
