= Charles Wesley's House =

Historic building in Bristol, England

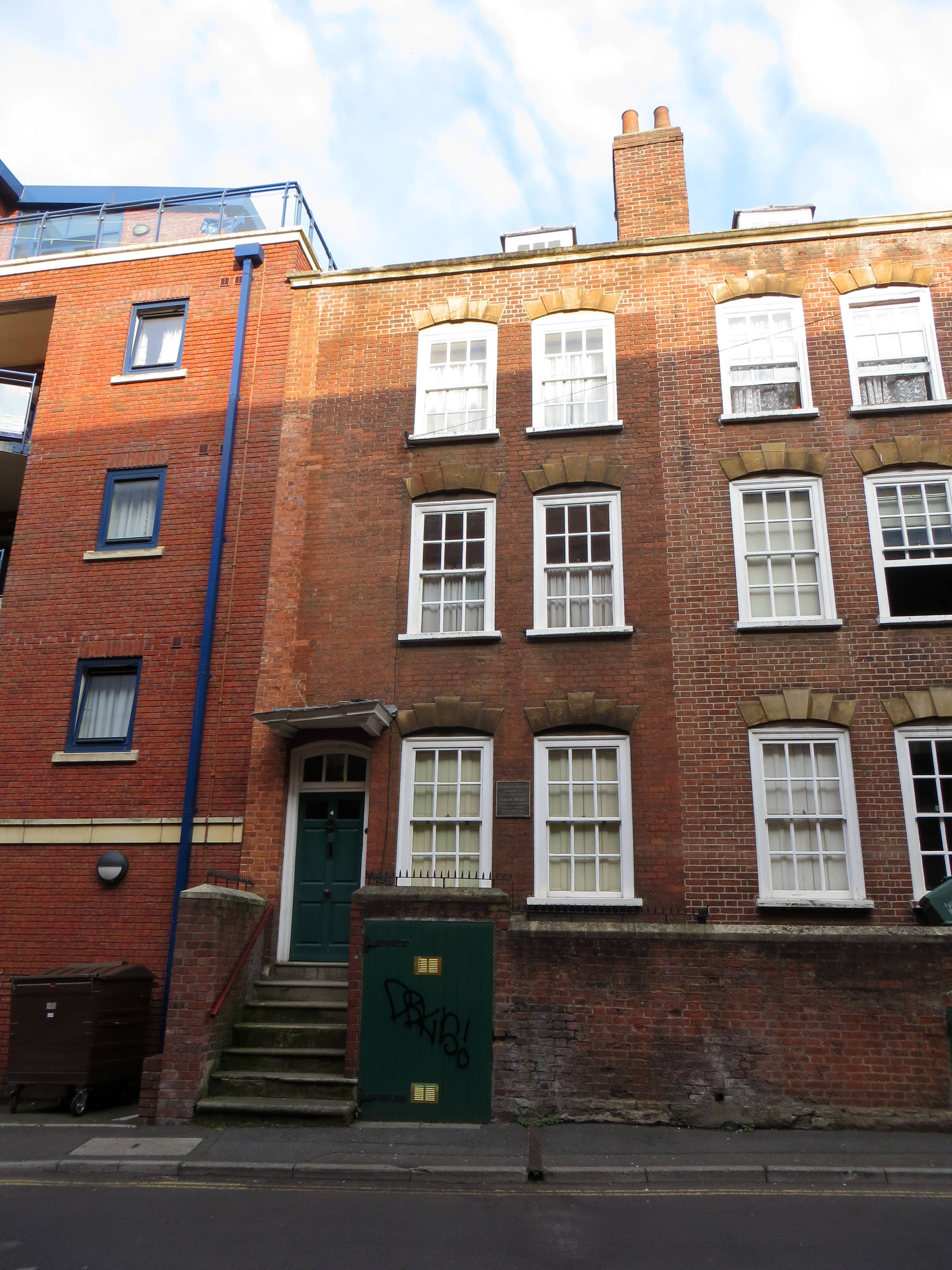
- Charles Wesley's house, No. 4 Charles Street, Bristol

- Location within Bristol

General information
- Location: Bristol, England
- Coordinates: 51.4603°N 2.5923°W

Listed Building – Grade II*
- Official name: 4 and 5, Charles Street
- Designated: 8 January 1959
- Reference no.: 1205019

Charles Wesley's House (grid reference ST589736) is a restored historic building at 4 Charles Street, Bristol, England. From 1749 to 1778 it was the house of Charles Wesley, hymn writer and co-founder of Methodism, and his wife Sarah Wesley, née Gwynne. It was Charles Wesley's main residence during 1756–71. It was the childhood home of his sons Charles Wesley junior and Samuel Wesley. They were musical child prodigies, who both became renowned organists and composers. The house's interior has been restored to its 18th-century appearance, with period fittings.

== Wesley family ==
Charles Wesley (1707–1788), and his wife, Sarah Gwynne (1726–1822) from Brecknockshire, moved into the house in September 1749, after their marriage earlier that year.

Initially, Charles continued his "itinerations", that is travelling and preaching around the country, and so was often away from home. Sarah sometimes accompanied him. By 1756 this lifestyle had taken its toll on his health, and after that year he made no further long journeys to distant parts of the country. However, he still spent much of his time away in London, attending to the Methodist community there.

He was the Methodist "minister in residence" for Bristol, and was described in the St James's Church parish records as a "preacher at the Horsefair". Charles and Sarah had many children, all baptised at St James's. In between Charles junior (1757–1834) and Samuel (1766–1837) they had a daughter, Sarah (1759–1828), who like her mother was often called Sally. There were other children, but they died young, and were buried in St James's churchyard.

== Child prodigies ==
The early musical education of Charles junior and Samuel mostly took place in the family home. The boys' earliest musical influence was their mother, who had a good singing voice and played the harpsichord. Hymn tunes and the works of Handel were the family's favourite pieces.

The first music teachers for the two prodigies were both local church organists. From around the age of six, Charles junior had lessons from Edmund Rooke, who was organist at All Saints' Church from 1759 and at Bristol Cathedral during 1769–73. From a similar age, Samuel had lessons from David Williams, who was the organist at All Saints' Church from 1772. Charles junior's public performances in Bristol included a 1769 harpsichord concerto at the Assembly Room, and an Easter 1774 organ concerto in Bristol Cathedral. On that occasion Samuel was aggrieved as he had expected to be the one giving the performance.

From 1771 onwards the family had two households, the other being in Chesterfield Street, Marylebone, London. Charles and Charles junior moved to the London house that year, and the whole family had moved to London by 1778. The London house was demolished in the mid-19th century.

== Architecture ==
The two attached houses at 4 and 5 Charles Street have been designated by English Heritage as a Grade II* listed building. It is early 18th-century, early Georgian in style, and built of brick with three storeys. At the front each house has two sash windows per floor, with stepped voussoirs over the windows. The houses are surrounded by modern buildings.

== See also ==
- John Wesley's New Room
- John Wesley's House
- Grade II* listed buildings in Bristol
