= St Nicholas' Almshouses =

Listed building in Bristol, England

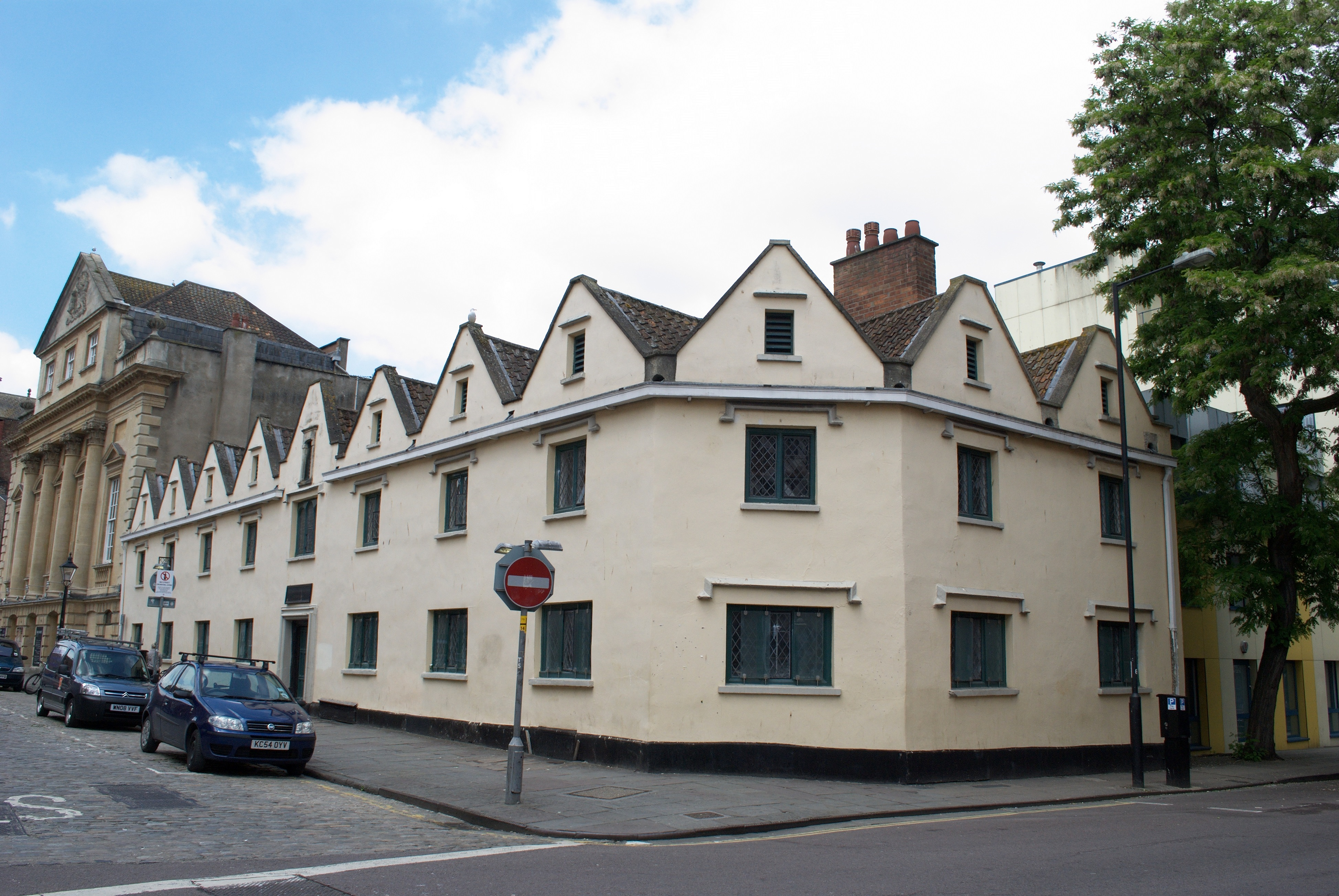
- The almhouses in 2010

- Location within Bristol

General information
- Location: King Street, Bristol, England
- Coordinates: 51.4522°N 2.5950°W
- Construction started: 1652
- Completed: 1656

Listed Building – Grade II*
- Official name: St Nicholas' Almshouses
- Designated: 8 January 1959
- Reference no.: 1209635

St Nicholas' Almshouses (grid reference ST587727) is a historic building on King Street in Bristol, England.

It was built in 1652 to 1656, extended in the 19th century and restored in 1961 by Donald Insall. The foundations of a bastion of the city wall were revealed during restoration. It has been designated by English Heritage as a Grade II* listed building.

The almshouse was one of the first buildings on King Street, a new development then outside the city wall and beside the "Back Street Gate".

The building was damaged during the Bristol Blitz and now presents only a facade to the street. It no longer serves the homeless as it did in previous centuries. It is now student accommodation.

== See also ==
- Grade II* listed buildings in Bristol
- List of British almshouses
