= Berkeley Crescent, Bristol =

Crescent of Georgian houses in Bristol, England

Berkeley Crescent
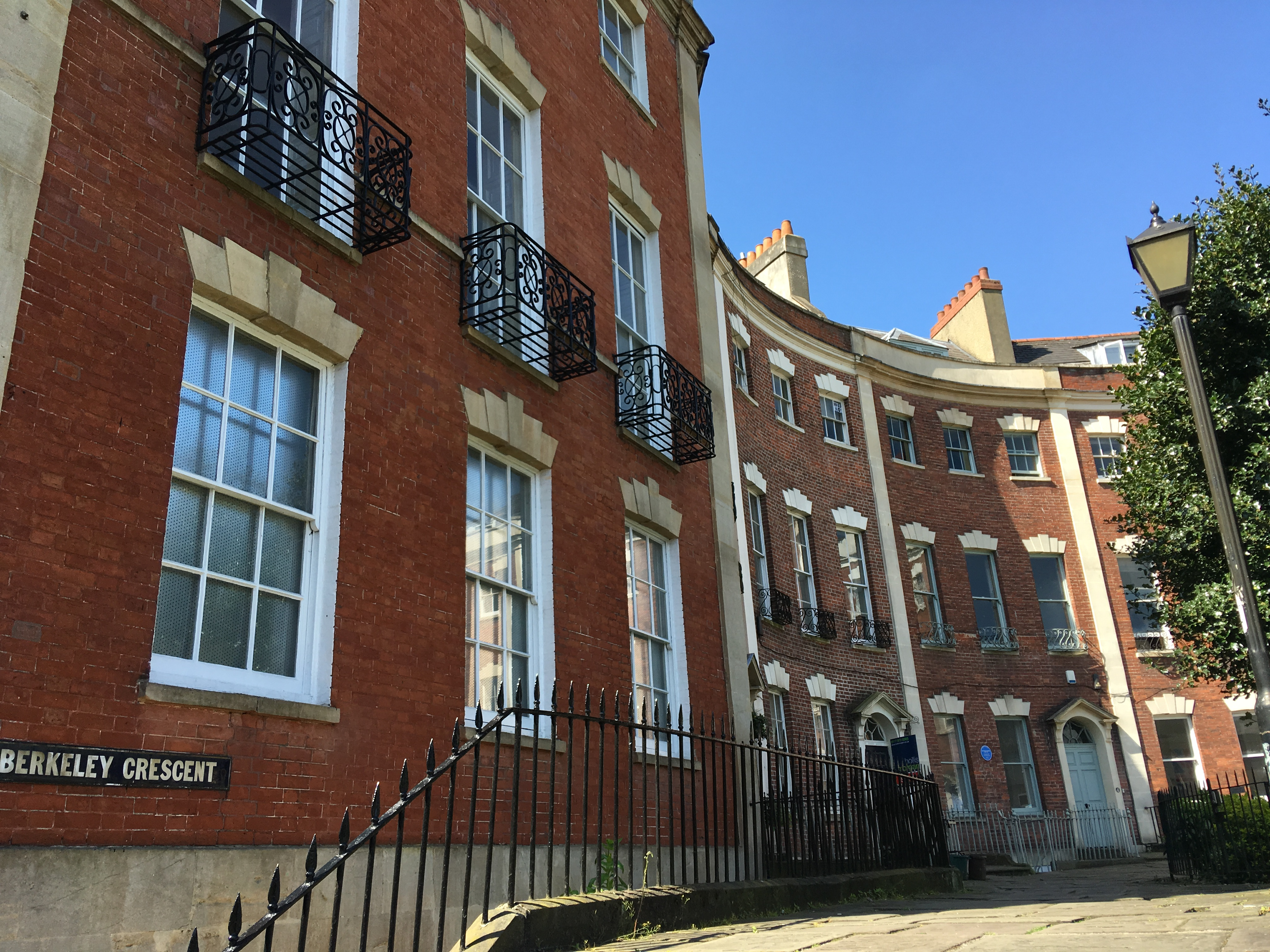
- Berkeley Crescent, Bristol

- Location within Bristol

General information
- Location: Bristol, England
- Coordinates: 51.455898°N 2.6088854°W
- Year built: 1787–c. 1800

Design and construction
- Architects: Thomas Paty; William Paty (possibly)

Listed Building – Grade II*
- Official name: 1 to 6 and attached railings 19 and attached railings
- Designated: 8 January 1959
- Reference no.: 1282395

Berkeley Crescent is a late 18th-century Grade II* listed crescent of six Georgian houses with a private communal garden in Bristol, England.

== History ==
It was designed by Thomas Paty (1713–1789) in 1787 and completed in c. 1800, possibly by his son, William Paty (1758–1800). It was originally intended to be part of Berkeley Square. In the 14th century, the site was known as Bartholomew Close.

Numbers 1–6 cover the south and east side of the crescent and are designated a Grade II* listed building; the listing includes 19 Berkeley Square. The houses are in the mid-Georgian style, constructed in brick with limestone dressings and a slate mansard roof. Each three-storey house has an attic and basement which has a double-depth plan. There is a raised flagged pavement with steps at each end.

== Location ==
The crescent is located within the Park Street and Brandon Hill conservation area between Berkeley Square and the Triangle in the Clifton area of Bristol. The postcode is within the Hotwells and Harbourside ward and electoral division, which is in the constituency of Bristol West. Quarter runs serviced apartments, called Berkeley Suites, at 6 Berkeley Crescent. The old Lyndale Hotel was situated at the end of the terrace at 19 Berkeley Square.

The Bristol Museum and Art Gallery, Cabot Tower in Brandon Hill Park, and the Wills Memorial Building of the University of Bristol are close by. The crescent was formerly in the parish of St Augustine the Less and is now in the parish of St Stephen with St James and St John the Baptist with St Michael, Bristol and St George, Bristol.

== See also ==
- Grade II* listed buildings in Bristol
