= The Victoria, Bristol =

Listed pub in Clifton, Bristol, England

The Victoria
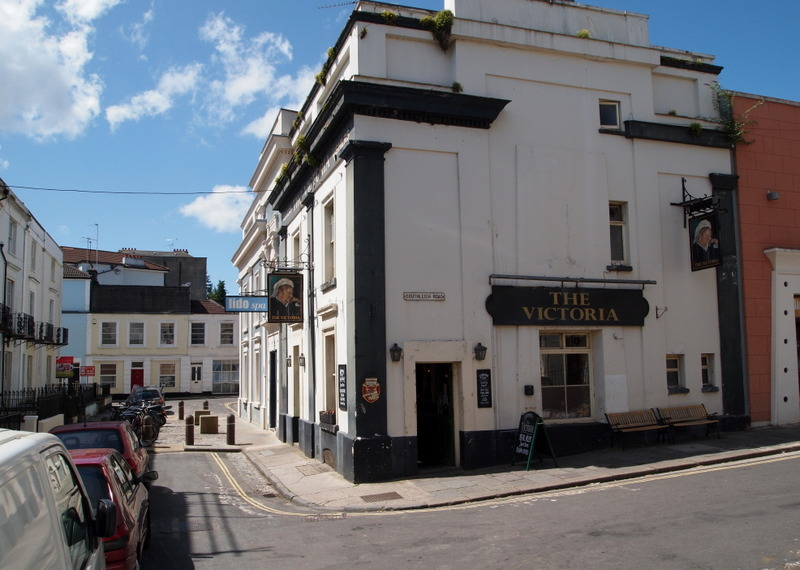
- The pub in 2012

- Location within Bristol

General information
- Location: Bristol, England
- Coordinates: 51.4589°N 2.6117°W
- Years built: c. 1867

Listed Building – Grade II*
- Official name: The Clifton Pool and The Victoria Public House
- Designated: 12 June 1998
- Reference no.: 1323692

The Victoria (grid reference ST576735) is a public house dating from 1867 in Bristol, England. It was built using part of the front building of The Lido. Inside there are two rooms and an original 19th-century fireplace, with the remainder of fixtures and fittings replaced more recently. The Victoria was designated Grade II* listed building status in 1998.

== History ==
The Victoria public house occupies a corner of the site of The Lido, taking a portion of the front building. On one side of the building is the spa entrance to the lido, with the pool on the other side. The public house was converted from part of the original lido buildings and was opened by 1867. The door to the public house is a later addition, meaning the building frontage has one door in the centre for the pool and one slightly to the right.

The interior of the pub comprises two rooms, with the original 19th-century fireplace remaining in the pub. The remainder of the interior has been replaced with modern fixtures and fittings. The lido and accompanying public house were designated Grade II* listed building status on 12 June 1998 and is set in a conservation area.

The pub remained open during the lido's closure and was not considered for demolition when the pool was. Originally a tied house of Georges Bristol Brewery, it passed to Ushers of Trowbridge in the 1960s and then through several hands. Since early 2006 the pub has been refurbished and operated by Dawkins Ales, a small local pub group and brewery, the third pub owned by the brewery.

== See also ==
- Grade II* listed buildings in Bristol
