= Cornwallis Crescent, Bristol =

Crescent of Georgian townhouses in Bristol, England

Cornwallis Crescent
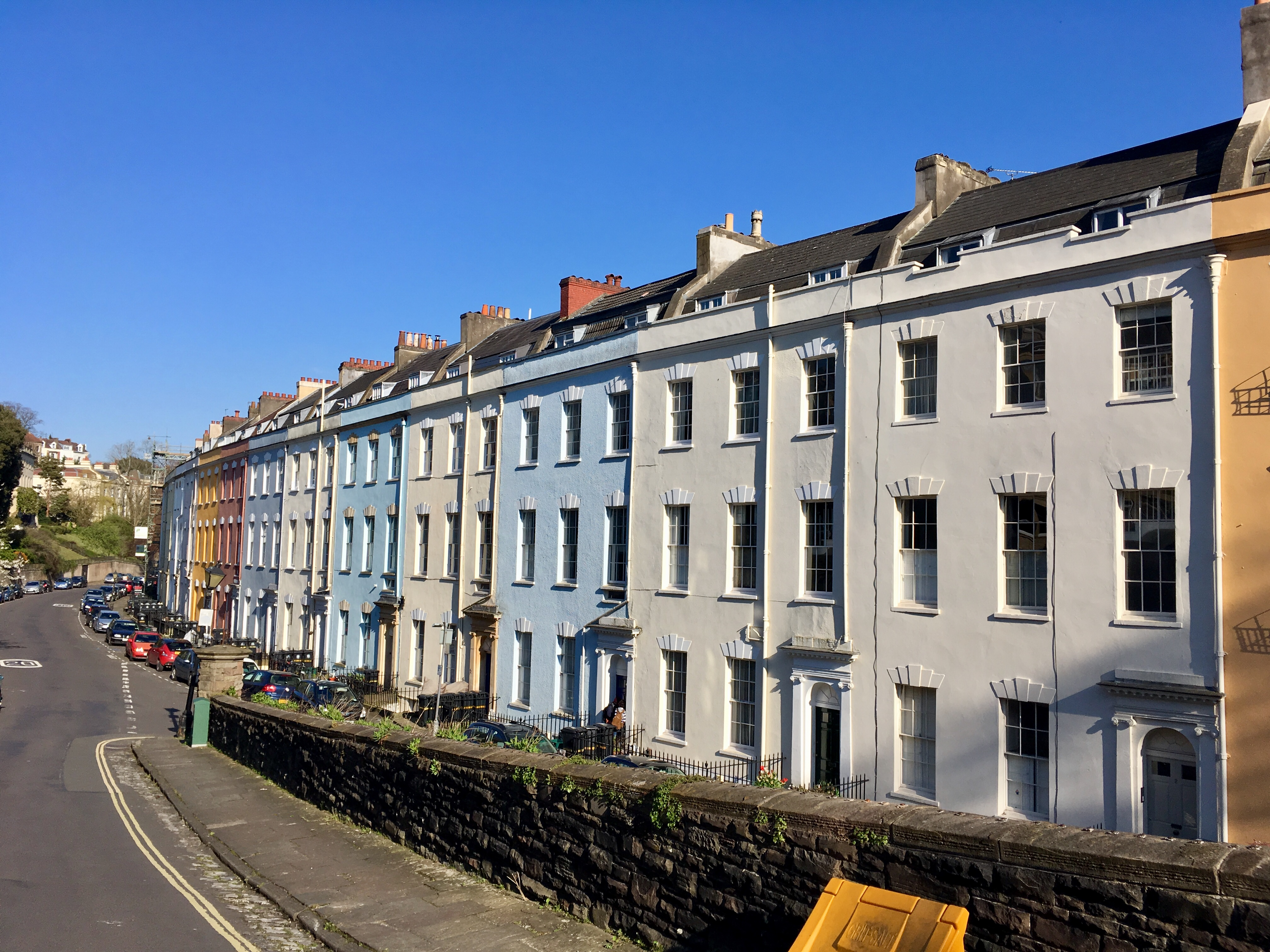
- Cornwallis Crescent

- Location in Bristol

General information
- Location: Bristol, England
- Coordinates: 51.4542°N 2.6265°W

Cornwallis Crescent is a late 18th-century crescent of Georgian town houses, located between York Gardens and Cornwallis Avenue in the Clifton area of Bristol, England. The postcode is within the Hotwells and Harbourside ward and electoral division, which is in the constituency of Bristol West.

The crescent, with private communal gardens, is located within the Clifton conservation area which has listed buildings and mid Georgian style which are constructed in brick with a limestone ashlar front and the rear of render over brick with limestone dressings. It has a slate mansard half-hipped roof. Each three-storey house has an attic and basement which has a double-depth plan.

== History ==
Building work on Cornwallis Crescent started in 1791, possibly under William Paty, but stopped in 1793 due to the bankruptcy of the developers. It was officially completed by 1827.

The communal gardens in the east and west part of the Crescent were completed in 1880.

There is a commemorative plaque at No. 31 Cornwallis Crescent, where philanthropist Susanna Winkworth and hymnologist Catherine Winkworth used to live.

The Clifton Suspension Bridge, Clifton Observatory and the Bristol Marina are close by.

== See also ==
- Grade II* listed buildings in Bristol
