= Caledonia Place, Bristol =

Street in Clifton, Bristol, England

Coordinates: 51.454338°N 2.623196°W

Caledonia Place
- Location within Bristol
- OS grid reference: ST568729
- Unitary authority: Bristol
- Ceremonial county: Bristol
- Region: South West
- Country: England
- Sovereign state: United Kingdom
- Post town: BRISTOL
- Postcode district: BS
- Dialling code: 0117
- Police: Avon and Somerset
- Fire: Avon
- Ambulance: South Western
- UK Parliament: Bristol East

Caledonia Place is a late 18th-century terrace of 31 Georgian houses, located between West Mall and Princess Victoria Street in the Clifton area of Bristol, England. The postcode is within the Clifton ward and electoral division, which is in the constituency of Bristol West.

== History ==
Caledonia Place was completed in 1843 by architects T. Foster and W. Okely; the area has Grade II listed buildings and mid-Georgian style. Each three-storey house has an attic and basement and has rear elevations differentiated by fine cast-iron Grecian balconies. In 1852 Lord Macaulay lived at No. 16 Caledonia Place.

Nos. 32 to 44 Caledonia Place were completed in 1788 to the design of Bath architect and surveyor, John Eveleigh. The central and end houses of the terrace are pedimented and broken forward with the variation giving the terrace a palatial appearance. Nos. 43 and 44 were converted into one in 1922 to form a bank.

In February 2015, following the introduction of a controlled parking zone by Bristol City Council, English Heritage advised the council that it should have sought listed building consent for the erection of parking restriction signs on railings outside listed buildings on the street.

The Mall, one of Clifton's thriving commercial thoroughfares, and to the southern end of the terrace is the Avon Gorge and Clifton Suspension Bridge are close by.

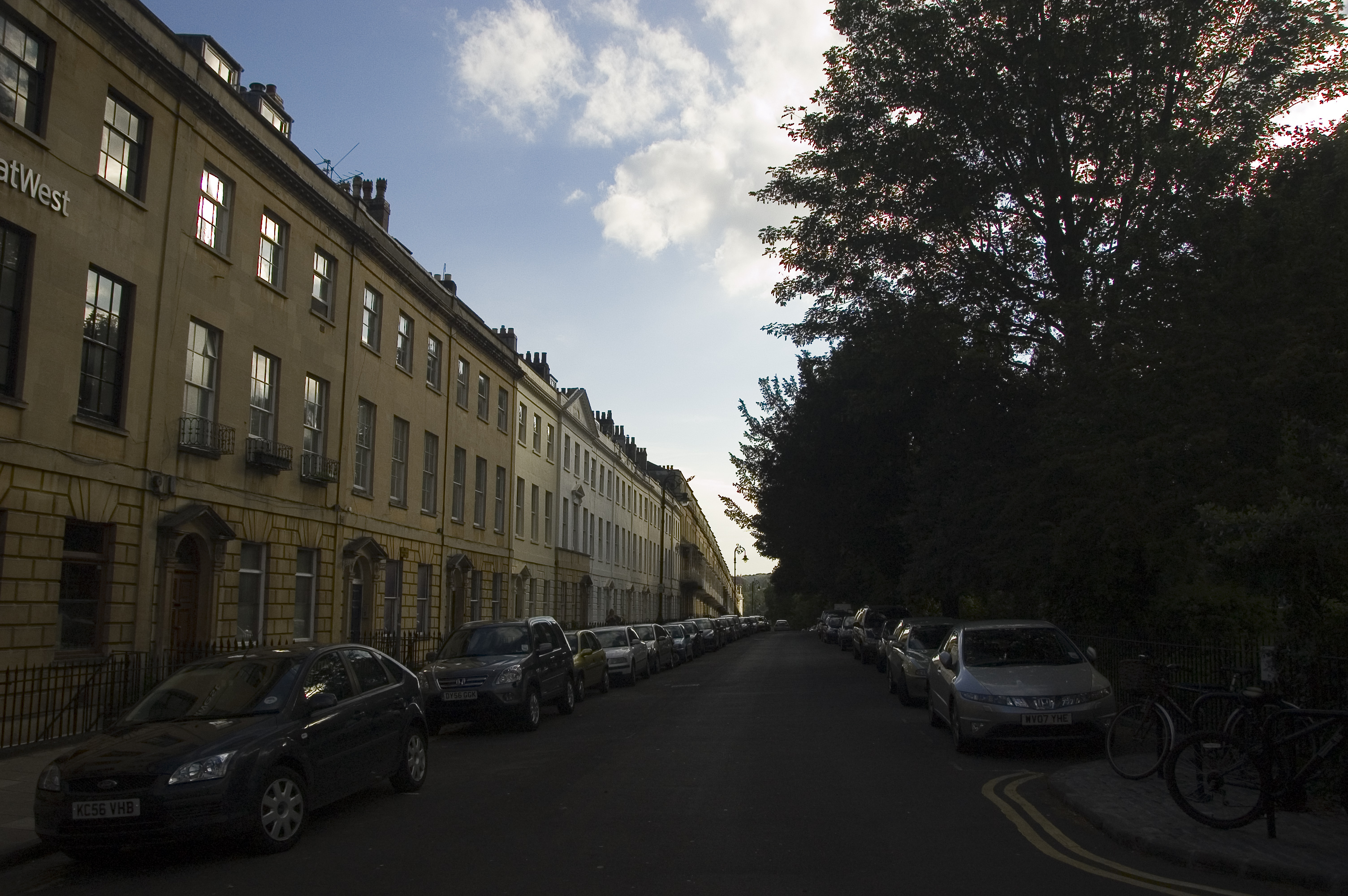
The eastern end of the terrace

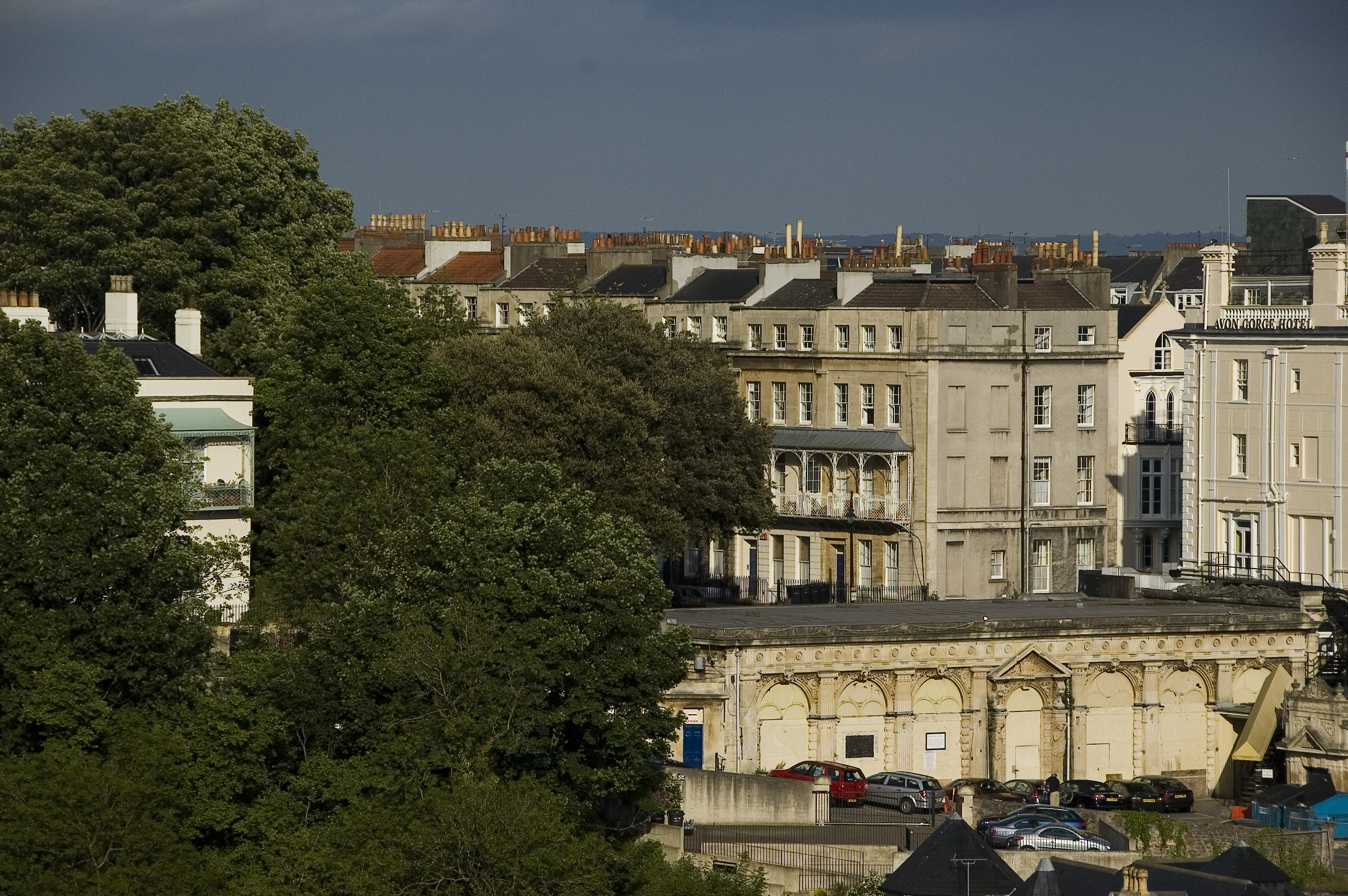
The western end of the terrace, from Clifton Suspension Bridge

== See also ==
- Grade II* listed buildings in Bristol
