= Holy Cross Inns Court Vicarage =

Listed building in Bristol, England

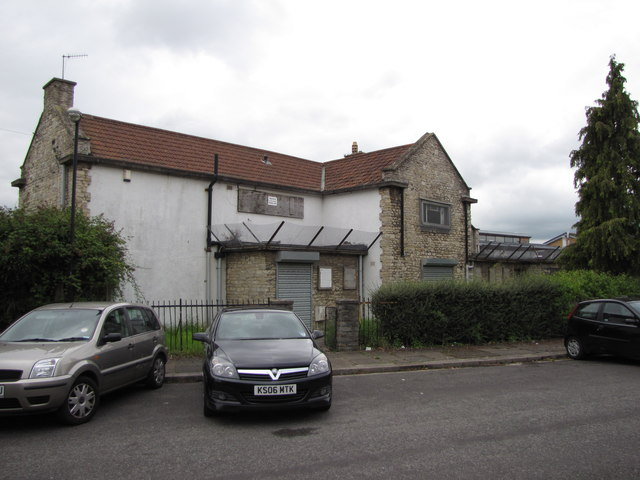
- The building in 2011

- Location within Bristol

General information
- Architectural style: Perpendicular Gothic
- Location: Knowle West, Bristol, England
- Coordinates: 51.4194°N 2.5953°W
- Year built: 15th century

Listed Building – Grade II*
- Official name: Holy Cross Inns Court Vicarage
- Designated: 8 January 1959
- Reference no.: 1202314

The Holy Cross Inns Court Vicarage (grid reference ST587691) is in the Knowle West area of Bristol, England.

It was built in the 15th century. The surviving fragment, a stair turret, comes from what was once a much larger house, which was probably built for the lawyer Sir John Innys, who died in 1439.

The 15th-century remains are designated by Historic England as a Grade II* listed building. The stair turret is on the Buildings at Risk Register and described as being in fair condition, suffering slow decay.

== See also ==
- Grade II* listed buildings in Bristol
