= Dowry Square =

Square in Bristol, England

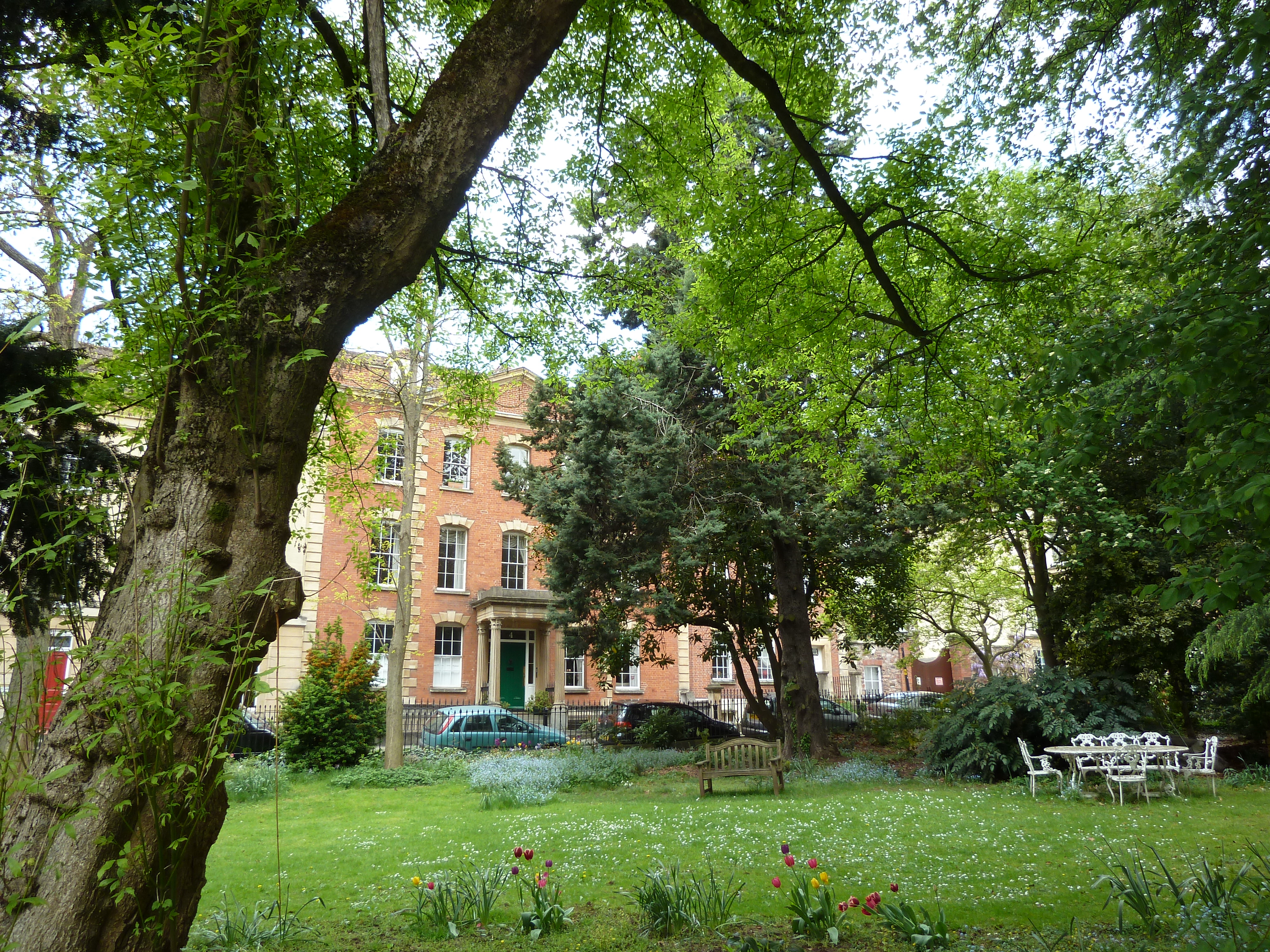
- Nº4 Dowry Square, viewed through the gardens in the centre of the square

- Location within Bristol
- Location: Bristol, England
- Postal code: BS8
- Coordinates: 51.4511°N 2.6201°W

Construction
- Construction start: 1727
- Completion: 1750

Other
- Designer: George Tully
- Website: dowrysquare.uk

Dowry Square is a square and green space in the Hotwells area of Bristol, England.

It was laid out in 1727 by George Tully and building continued until 1750. The houses are three-storeyed with attics, simply detailed and with channelled pilasters to the party walls.

In 1799 Dr Thomas Beddoes opened a laboratory in Dowry Square as the Pneumatic Institution where he worked with Sir Humphry Davy.

== Architecture ==
Many of the buildings have been designated as Grade II* or Grade II listed.

- No. 1 (Grade II)
- No. 2 (Grade II)
- No. 3 (Grade II)
- No. 4 (Grade II*)
- No. 5 (Grade II)
- No. 6 (Grade II*)
- No. 7 (Grade II*)
- No. 8 (Grade II)
- No. 9 (Grade II*)
- No. 10 (Grade II*)
- No. 11 (Grade II*)
- No. 12 (Grade II*)
- No. 13, established in 1811 as the Clifton Dispensary (Grade II)
- Nos. 14 and 15 (Grade II)
- No. 16 York House (Grade II)
- K6 telephone kiosk (Grade II)
- Plinth and railings around Dowry Square gardens (Grade II)

== See also ==
- Grade II* listed buildings in Bristol
