= The Famous Royal Navy Volunteer =

Historic building on King Street in the English city of Bristol

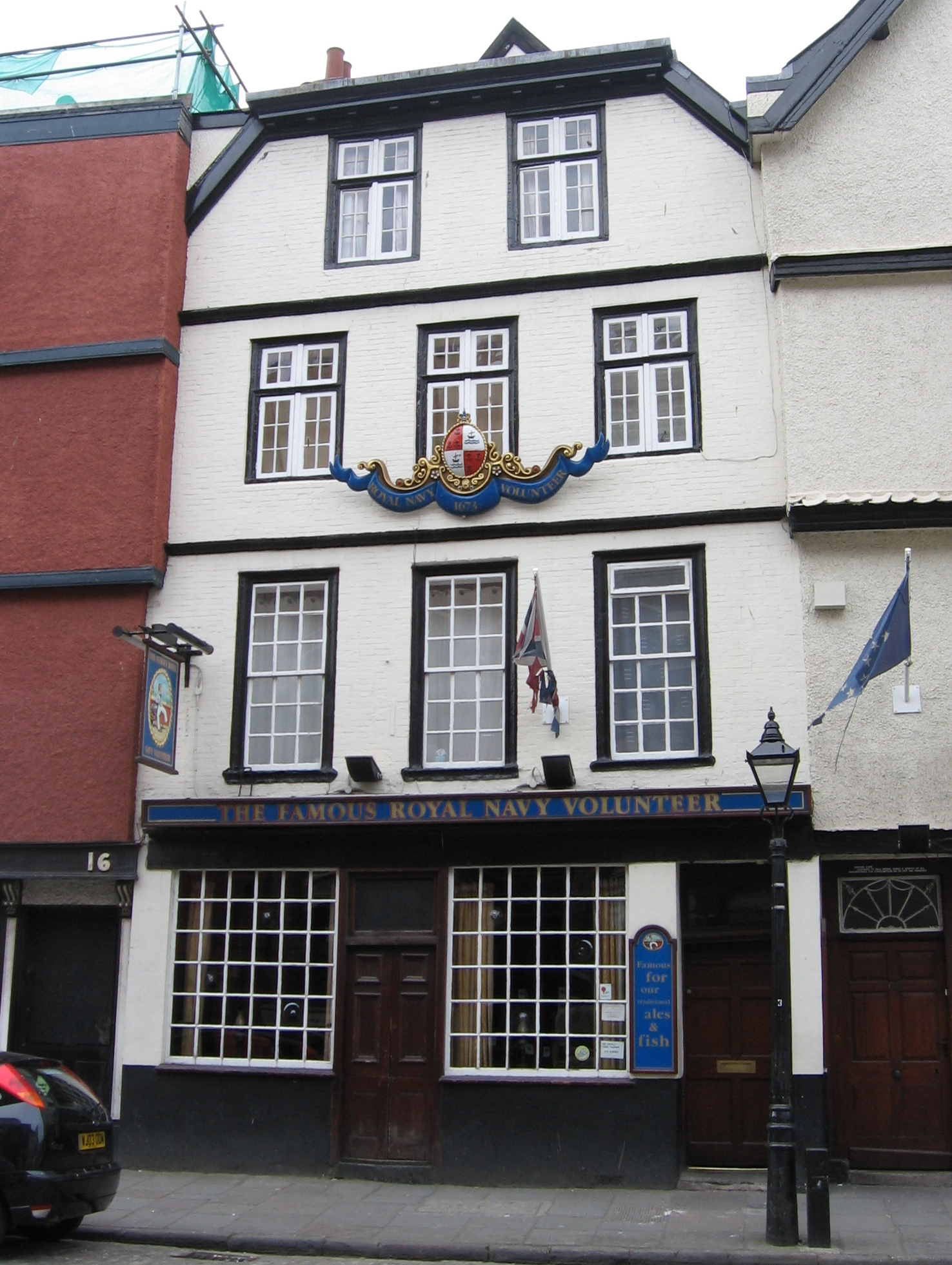

- Location within Bristol

General information
- Location: Bristol, England
- Coordinates: 51.4517°N 2.5946°W
- Completed: 1665

The Famous Royal Navy Volunteer is a pub on King Street in the English city of Bristol. Previously known as the Naval Volunteer, Royal Naval Volunteer and Royal Navy Volunteer, it is located at 17 King Street and 18 King Street.

17 King Street dates from 1665 and has been designated by English Heritage as a grade II* listed building.
