= 6 King Street, Bristol =

Listed building in Bristol, England

6 King Street
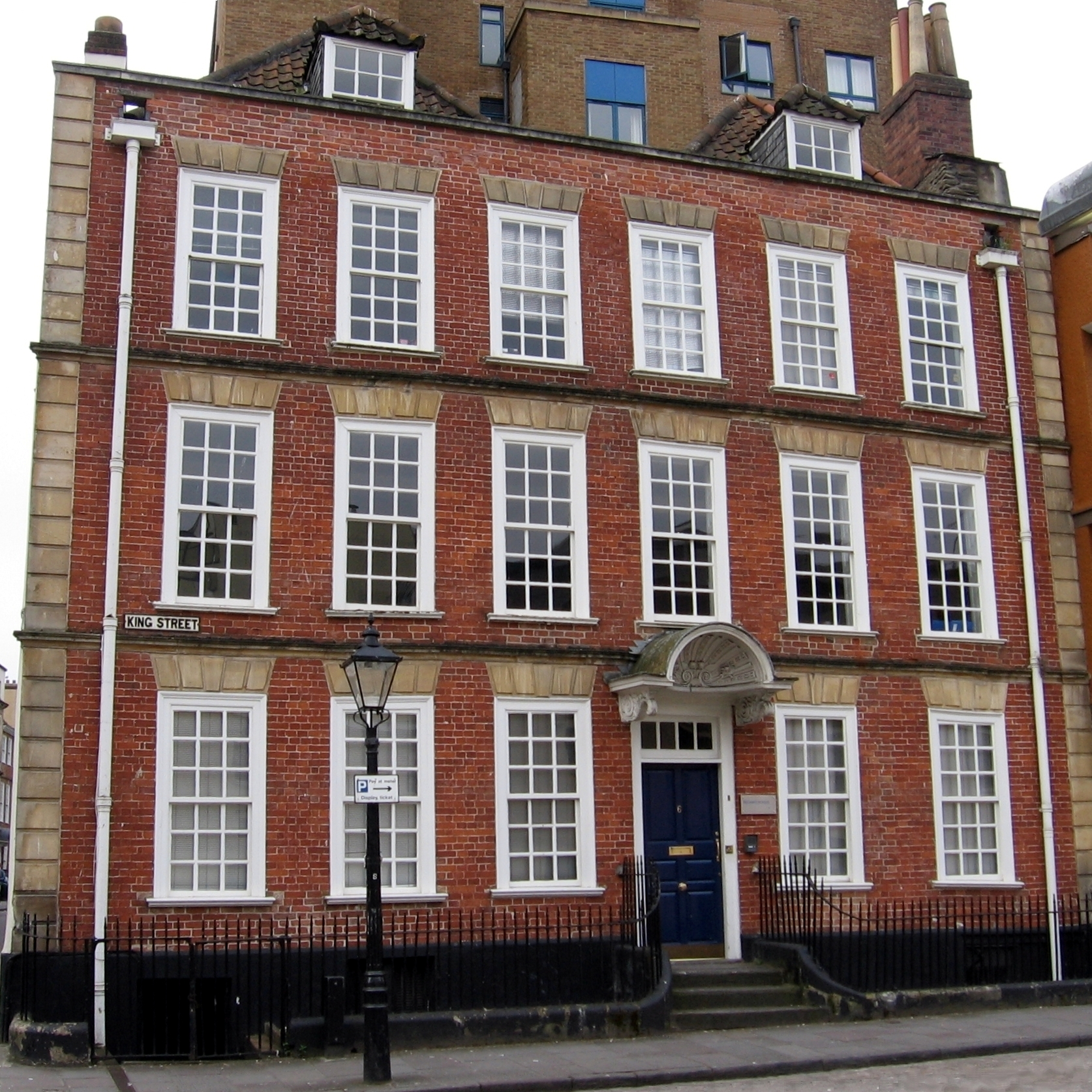

- Location within Bristol

General information
- Location: King Street, Bristol, England
- Coordinates: 51.4519°N 2.5935°W
- Years built: c. 1665

Technical details
- Structural system: Timber frame

Listed Building – Grade II*
- Official name: Number 6 and attached railings
- Designated: 8 January 1959
- Reference no.: 1202325

6 King Street is a historic house situated on King Street in Bristol, England.

It dates from 1665, but the present early Georgian frontage dates from about 1720. It is thought that the original roof had gables, similar to those seen on the neighbouring 7 and 8, which were cut back to form the hips seen today. The interior retains many 18th-century features.

It has been designated by English Heritage as a Grade II* listed building.

As of 2025 it is occupied by an architectural firm.

== See also ==
- Grade II* listed buildings in Bristol
