= Grade II listed buildings in Bristol =

There are many Grade II listed buildings in Bristol, United Kingdom.

In England and Wales the authority for listingc is granted by the Planning (Listed Buildings and Conservation Areas) Act 1990 and is administered by English Heritage, an agency of the Department for Digital, Culture, Media and Sport.

In the United Kingdom the term "listed building" refers to a building or other structure officially designated as being of special architectural, historical or cultural significance.

== A–C ==
Name (alternative name)	Built	Location	Grid ref^{[A]}	Ref(s)^{[B]}	Photo
A Bond Tobacco Warehouse	1905	Cumberland Basin Bristol Harbour	ST571722		
Academy Cinema (Christadelphian Hall, Magic Box)	1914	Cheltenham Road	ST590744		
Alderman Proctor's Drinking Fountain	1872	Clifton Down	ST566738		
Church of All Saints, Clifton	1868	Clifton, Bristol			
Arley Chapel (Polish Church of Our Lady of Ostrobrama)	1855	Arley Hill, Cotham			
Armada House, Bristol (Nova House)	1903	Telephone Avenue	ST587728		
B Bond Warehouse; Create Centre & Bristol Archives	1908	Smeaton Road, Spike Island	ST570720		
Former National Westminster Bank		36, Corn Street	ST58797296		
Brislington House	1806	Brislington	ST631702		
Bristol Beacon (formerly Colston Hall)	1860s	Colston Street			
Bristol Cenotaph	1932	The Centre	ST 587731		
Bristol Grammar School	1877	Tyndall's Park			
Bristol Hippodrome	1911	11–14 St Augustines Parade	ST590729		
Bristol Improv Theatre (formerly The Polish Ex-Servicemen's Club)	c.1850	50, St Paul's Road, Clifton	ST575734		
Bristol North Baths	c.1912	Gloucester Road, Bishopston	ST589749		
Bristol Zoo		Clifton	ST570741		
Brown's Restaurant (former City Museum and Library) (former University Refectory and Dining Room)	1867–71	Queens Road	ST580732		
Cabot Tower	1897	Brandon Hill			
Callandar House	18th century	Clifton Hill House, Clifton	ST571737		
Canon's House	1991	Canons Way, Canon's Marsh	ST583723		
Central Police Station, Bristol (Bridewell)	1928	Nelson Street, Broadmead			
Chatterton's house and school, and attached screen wall	1749	Redcliffe Way, Redcliffe			
Christmas Steps	1720 & 1800	Bristol city centre	ST586731	,,,,	
Church of All Hallows	1899	All Hallows Road, Easton			
Church of St Jude the Apostle with St Matthias-on-the-Weir	1849	Braggs Lane, Old Market			
City Road Baptist Church (former City Road Baptist Chapel)	1861	Upper York Street, Stokes Croft			
17 and 19 Clare Street	1899	Clare Street			
Clarks Wood Company warehouse	c.1863	Silverthorne Lane, St Philips	ST605726		
Clifton College		Clifton	ST569737		
Clifton Down railway station	1874	Clifton	ST576741		
22 and 24 Clifton Wood Road		Clifton Wood Road	ST576726		
Coldharbour Road Cottages	c. 1600	Redland, Bristol	ST576751		
Edward Colston statue	1895	M Shed museum; formerly on The Centre	ST586731		
Collegiate School (formerly Colston's School) (former Bishops Palace)	c.1725				
Coroners Court, Bristol (School, now court and mortuary)	1857–58	Backfields, Stokes Croft			
Cossham Memorial Hospital	1905–07	Kingswood			
Cotham Park obelisks	18th century	Cotham Park, Cotham	ST585740		

== D–H ==
Name (alternative name)	Built	Location	Grid ref^{[A]}	Ref(s)^{[B]}	Photo
Dower House (formerly Stoke Park House)	1553 (Rebuilt c.1760–70)	Stoke Lane, Stoke Park, Stapleton	ST614767		
Dowry Square	1727–50	Hotwells	ST572727		
Electricity House	1935–37	The Centre			
Emanuel Court	1869	Guthrie Road, Clifton			
Employment Exchange, Bristol (Labour Exchange)	1931	All Saints Street, Broadmead			
Everyman Bristol (Whiteladies Picture House)	1920–21	Whiteladies Road, Clifton	ST576742		
Old Fish Market, Bristol (now public house)	1873	45–57 Baldwin Street			
Former Gardiners offices (part of Christopher Thomas Brothers' Soap Works)	1865–67	Old Bread Street			
Former pattern-maker's shop and stores	1888	Underfall Yard Bristol Harbour			
Former premises of Marble Mosaic Company	mid-19th century	Avon Street (East end)			
Gardiners warehouse (part of Christopher Thomas Brothers' Soap Works)	1865 and 1884	Straight Street (Broad Plain)	ST596729		
Glenside (Beaufort Hospital) (Blackberry Hill Hospital)	1861	Fishponds	ST625763		
Glenside Museum (Previously hospital chapel)	1861	Fishponds	ST625763		
Goldney Hall	1720	Clifton	ST571737		
Hatchet Inn	1606	Frogmore Street			
Henbury Village Hall (Henbury School)	1830	Church Lane, Henbury			
Pissoir on Horfield Common	late-19th century	Gloucester Road, Horfield	ST5947876850		

== I–R ==
Name (alternative name)	Built	Location	Grid ref^{[A]}	Ref(s)^{[B]}	Photo
37 and 39 Jamaica Street	1905 and 1909	Stokes Croft	ST590738		
Keepers Cottage	c.1690	Brislington			
Kensington Baptist Church (Kensington Baptist Chapel)	1888	Stapleton Road, Easton	ST604741		
14 and 15 King Street	c.1860	King Street, Bristol	ST588727		
32 King Street	c.1860	King Street, Bristol	ST588727		
34 King Street	early 18th century	King Street, Bristol	ST588727		
35 King Street	1870	King Street, Bristol	ST588727		
The King's Head	1600s	60 Victoria Street, Bristol	ST592727		
Kingsweston Iron Bridge	1821	Kings Weston Road, Sea Mills	ST544772		
Mauretania Public House	1870	Park Street, Bristol			
Merchant Hall	1868	The Promenade, Clifton Down			
Muller House	1862		ST598755		
Montpelier High School, Bristol (Formerly Colston's Girls' School)	1891		ST590744		
Nova Scotia	early 19th century	Spike Island	ST571721		
Old City Gaol, Bristol	1832	Cumberland Road, Bristol Harbour			
Old Lodge	early 19th century	166 Henleaze Road, Henleaze	ST577766		
Old Duke	1780	King Street, Bristol	ST588727		
Palace Hotel	c.1860	West Street, Old Market	ST597732		
Patent slip and quay walls	1888	Underfall Yard Bristol Harbour			
The Pavilions (Former Central Electricity Generating Board Headquarters)	1975–78	Bridgwater Road, Bedminster Down	ST561696		
Portland Square (Gates & Railings of gardens)	early 18th century	St Pauls	ST594737		
Prince's Wharf and Wapping Wharf		Bristol Harbour			
Prince Street Bridge		Bristol Harbour	ST585724		
Printers Devil (former Queen's Head)	18th century	Broad Plain	ST595729		
The Pump House	1870	Cumberland Basin, Hotwells, Bristol Harbour	ST571723		
Queen Elizabeth's Hospital	1847	Berkley Place			
Queen Square			ST591722		
Queen Victoria Statue	1888	College Green, Bristol	ST583727		
Robinson's Warehouse	1875	Bathurst Parade	ST585725		

== R–Z ==
Name (alternative name)	Built	Location	Grid ref^{[A]}	Ref(s)^{[B]}	Photo
Seven Stars Public House	18th century	Thomas Lane	ST591727		
Shaftesbury Chambers	1904	Corn Street			
Shakespeare Inn	1636	Victoria Street	ST592726		
Stag and Hounds	1483 rebuilt early C18	Old Market Street, Old Market	ST595731		
St Aidan	1902	Nicholas Lane, St George			
St Alban, Redland	1907	Coldharbour Lane, Redland			
St John the Baptist	1834	Frenchay	ST639773		
St John's Place	1841	Apsley Road, Clifton			
St Luke's Church, Barton Hill	1840s	Queen Ann Road, Barton Hill			
St Mary le Port Church (Tower)	15th century		ST589730		
St Mary Magdalene, Sneyd Park	1860	Mariners Drive, Sneyd Park			
St Mary, Fishponds	1821	Manor Road, Fishponds			
St Mary, Shirehampton	1929	High Street, Shirehampton			
St Matthews Church, Cotham	1833–35	Clare Rd Cotham	ST587740		
St Matthias (Lodge)	1852	Fishponds	ST633763		
St Oswald's Church	1927	Cheddar Grove, Bedminster Down			
St Paul	1831	Coronation Road, Southville			
Trinity Road Library (Originally St Philips Public Library)	1896	Trinity Road, Lawrence Hill	ST600734		
16 Victoria Street	c.1875	Victoria Street	ST591728		
Warehouse premises of Hardware (Bristol) Limited (part of Christopher Thomas Brothers' Soap Works)	1882	Old Bread Street	ST596728		
Wills Hall	1920s	Stoke Bishop			
Woodlands Christian Centre (former Church of St Mary the Virgin)	1870–81	Belgrave Road / Woodland Road	ST5802473811		
Wool Hall	1830	St Thomas Street	ST591727		

== Notes ==
^{A} Grid reference is based on the British national grid reference system, also known as OSGB36, and is the system used by the Ordnance Survey.
^{B} References are to the data sheets for each site on Images of England which is funded by English Heritage and the Heritage Lottery Fund, to create a 'point in time' photographic record of England's listed buildings. The list is of the buildings listed at the turn of the millennium; it is not an up-to-date record of all listed buildings. The listing status and descriptions shown on the Images of England website are the listings as at February 2001.

== See also ==
- Buildings and architecture of Bristol
- Grade I listed buildings in Bristol
- Grade II* listed buildings in Bristol
