= King's Head =

King's Head or Kings Head may refer to:

== Pubs ==
- King's Head, a popular pub name
- The King's Head, Amlwch, Anglesey, Wales
- King's Head Inn, Aylesbury, Buckinghamshire, England
- The King's Head, Beverley, East Riding of Yorkshire, England
- King's Head, Bexley, London, England
- King's Head, Bolton, Greater Manchester, England
- The King's Head, Bristol, England
- The King's Head, Fulham, London, England
- King's Head, Gunnerside, North Yorkshire, England
- King's Head, Merton, London, England
- King's Head Hotel, Mitcham, later renamed Burn Bullock (public house)
- Kings Head Hotel, Monmouth, Wales
- Kings Head Hotel, Richmond, North Yorkshire, England
- King's Head, Roehampton, London, England
- King's Head, Shrewsbury, Shropshire, England
- King's Head, Tooting, London, England
- Kings Head, West Tilbury, Essex, England
- Old King's Head, Kirton, Lincolnshire, England
- Old King's Head Hotel, Chester, Cheshire, England
- Kings Head Tavern, Hurstville, Australia, scene of 2003 Kings Head Tavern shooting

== Other uses ==
- Kings Head, Nova Scotia, a headland in Melmerby Beach Provincial Park, Canada
- King's Head Club or Green Ribbon Club, a 17th-century English political association
- King's Head Mill, Battle, Sussex, England
- King's Head Society, an 18th-century organisation funding dissenting academies in England
- King's Head Theatre, London, England

== See also ==
- Live at the Kings Head Inn, an album by Avail
