= Eveline Dew Blacker =

British architect (1884–1956)

- Born: 1884; Bristol, England
- Died: 21 May 1956 (aged 71–72); Clifton, Bristol, England
- Occupation: Architect
- Known for: Bristol Cenotaph

Eveline Dew Blacker (1884 – 21 May 1956) was a British architect based in Bristol, widely described as the city's first female architect. From 1918 to 1936 she was in practice with Harry Heathman as Heathman & Blacker, a partnership that contributed to the design of inter-war housing schemes in Bristol and of the Bristol Cenotaph, for which she has been described as the first female architect to win a competition for a war memorial.

== Early life and training ==
Blacker was born in Bristol in 1884, the daughter of Dr Arthur E. Blacker. In 1901 the family moved to 20 Victoria Square in Clifton, where she lived out her life. She attended Redland High School for Girls, and by 1905 was seeking work as an architectural student. She subsequently entered the office of Sir George Oatley, with whom she trained for four years before remaining for a further period as an assistant. By the time of the 1911 census, when she was still living in Victoria Square, she was recorded simply as an architect.

== Career ==
Blacker emerged into public view through architectural competitions during and immediately after World War I. In 1918 she shared a prize at the National Eisteddfod of Wales for a design for agricultural labourers' cottages, while Harry Heathman received a separate award in the same competition. Early in 1919 the two were reported to have come first, out of more than 100 entrants, in a Scottish housing competition promoted by the Institute of Scottish Architects and the Local Government Board for Scotland. The Town Planning Review later recorded them as winners of the principal premium in the section for cottage and flatted housing layouts.

From 1918 until 1936 she practised with Heathman in the Bristol firm of Heathman & Blacker, sometimes also styled in contemporary sources as Miss E. Blacker and H. Heathman. The practice was based at 4 Colston Street, and in June 1919 was among the prize winners in Bristol Corporation's major competition for new municipal housing. Heathman & Blacker were then among the architects selected to advise on the city's post-war housing programme.

Much of Blacker's known work belongs to Bristol's inter-war municipal expansion. At Hillfields, in the demonstration area of the city's early council housing scheme, Heathman & Blacker produced one of the experimental two-bedroom terrace types and also a three-bedroom non-parlour design that informed later short terraces built more widely on Bristol estates. The firm also designed many of the neo-Georgian houses in Sea Mills, along with Benjamin Wakefield. Beyond municipal housing, the firm provided designs for private houses and commercial commissions in Bristol.

=== Bristol Cenotaph ===
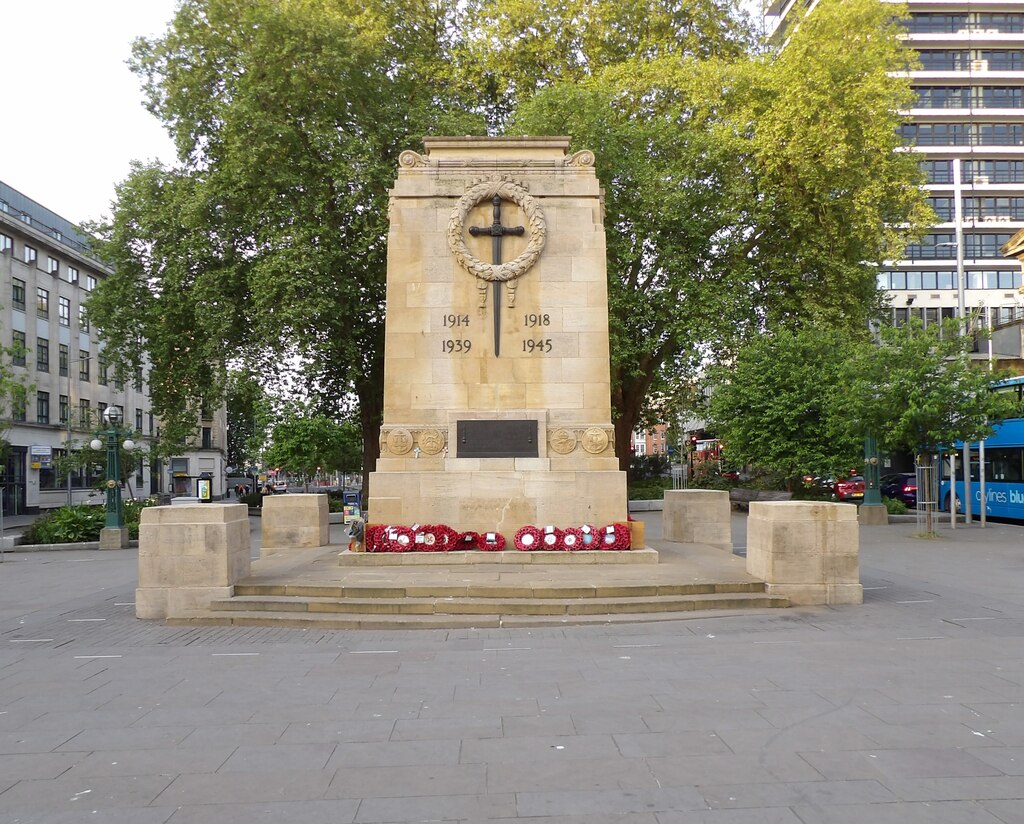
The Bristol Cenotaph

Blacker's best-known work is the Bristol Cenotaph at The Centre. Bristol was slow to establish a principal civic memorial to its World War I dead, and it was only in 1931 that a competition restricted to local architects was organised, with George Lawrence acting as assessor. Eighteen entries were submitted, of which three were shortlisted for exhibition and public voting at the City Art Gallery. The design by Heathman & Blacker was chosen ahead of proposals by Adrian E. Powell and Charles Roy Beecroft.

Although reports from the time generally referred to the winning architects as "Messrs" Heathman & Blacker, Sarah Whittingham later noted that "'Mr Blacker' was Miss Eveline Blacker". The memorial itself, unveiled on 26 June 1932 before a crowd reported at 50,000, is a Portland-stone cenotaph in the broad tradition of Lutyens's Whitehall monument. It stands on a stepped base and incorporates laurel wreaths, bronze swords, Bristol heraldic devices and a frieze of regimental badges beneath a sarcophagus-like upper stage. Pevsner later described it as a significant, if late, competition success for Heathman & Blacker.

== Later life and death ==
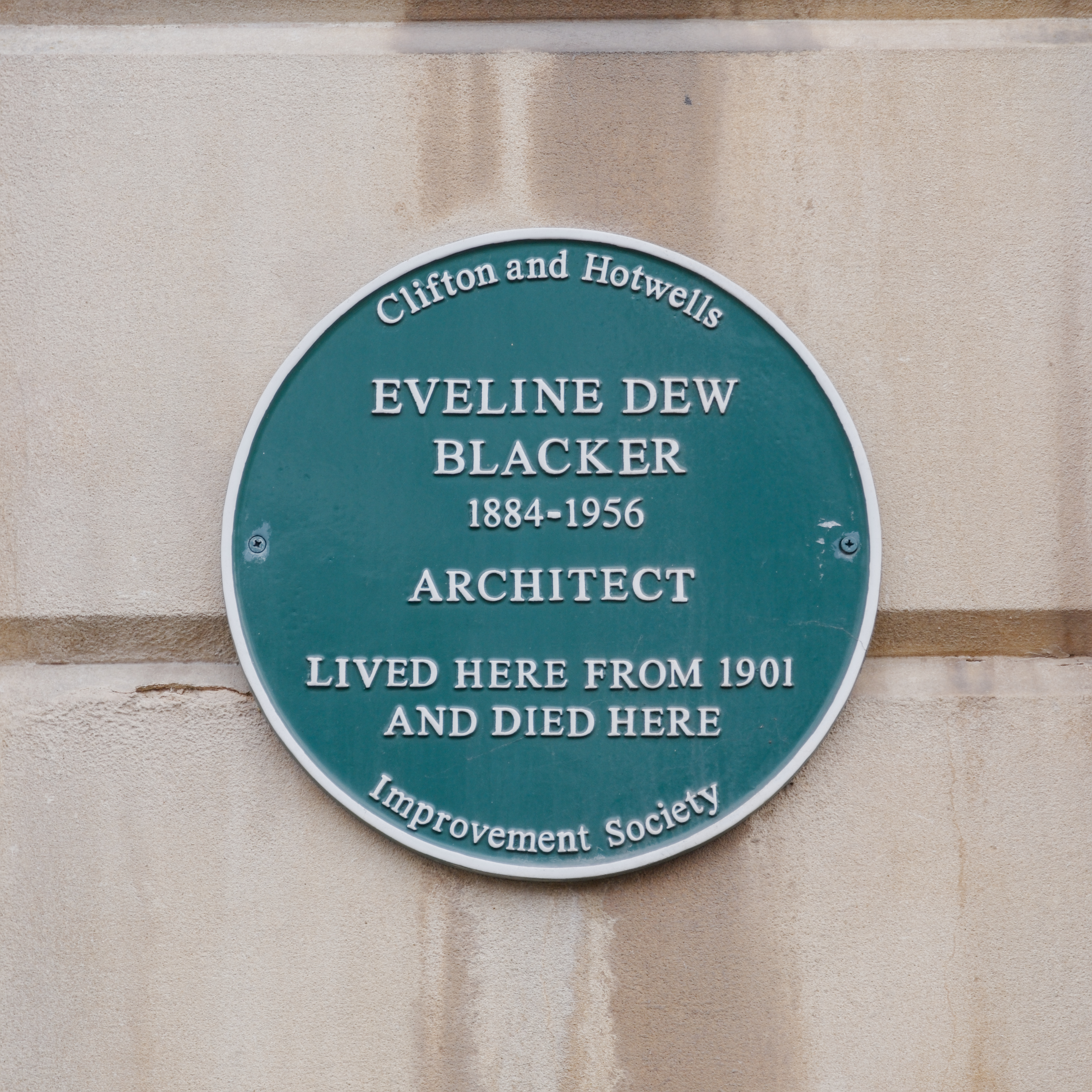
Plaque for Blacker installed by the Clifton and Hotwells Improvement Society in 2016

Blacker remained at 20 Victoria Square for the rest of her life. When her father died in 1925, she and her sisters Winifred and Muriel were named among the chief mourners at his funeral held in St Andrew's Church. She died in Clifton on 21 May 1956.

== Legacy ==
Eugene Byrne included her among the less well-known women of the city, describing her as an architect who "co-designed Bristol's cenotaph as well as a lot of inter-war Bristol housing". In 2016 the Clifton and Hotwells Improvement Society unveiled a plaque at 20 Victoria Square to mark the sixtieth anniversary of her death.
