= Marsh Street =

Street in Bristol, England

Coordinates: 51°27′10.11″N 2°35′46.27″W

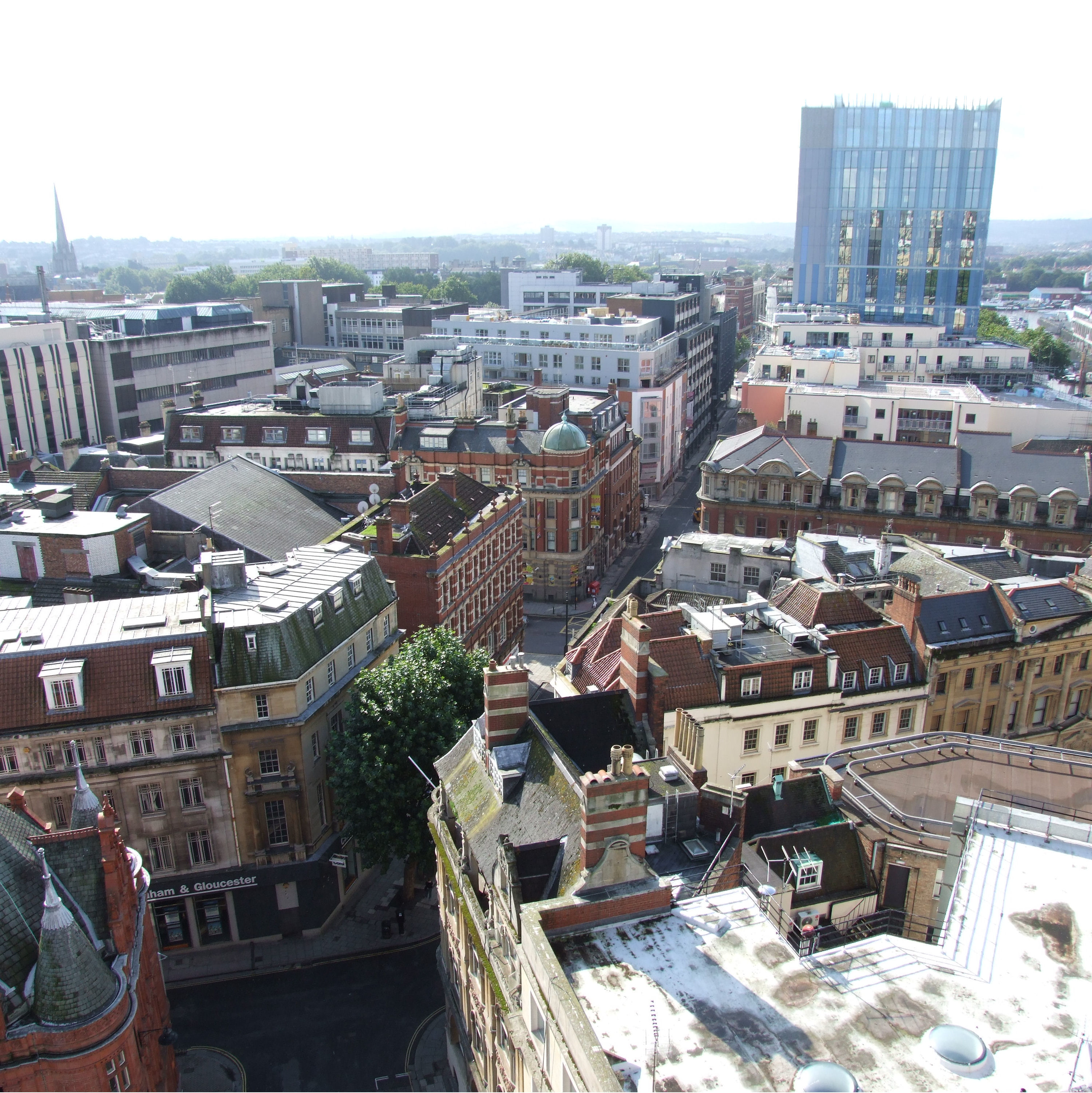
Marsh Street from St. Stephens Tower

Marsh Street is a street in the city of Bristol, England.

Located in the historic city centre of Bristol, it runs in a northerly direction for about 200 yards from its junction with King Street and Prince Street to Clare Street.

The street is noted in the diary of Samuel Pepys as the birthplace of his maid and love interest Deb Willet.

In 1967, the Bristol and West building society built its then headquarters in Marsh Street. The building has since been converted to different use.
