= SWEB Energy =

British electricity supplier (1947–1993)

- Formerly: South Western Electricity Board
- Founded: 14 August 1947
- Defunct: 10 December 1993
- Parent: Southern Company (1995-1999); Western Power Distribution (1999); EDF Energy (from 1999)

SWEB Energy, formerly South Western Electricity Board (SWEB) was a British state-owned regional electricity company operating in South West England which was privatised by the Thatcher government. Although sold many times, the 'SWEB' brand name survived until 2006.

The distribution network operator for the former SWEB area is now National Grid Electricity Distribution. The incumbent electricity retail company is EDF Energy.

== South Western Electricity Board (SWEB) ==
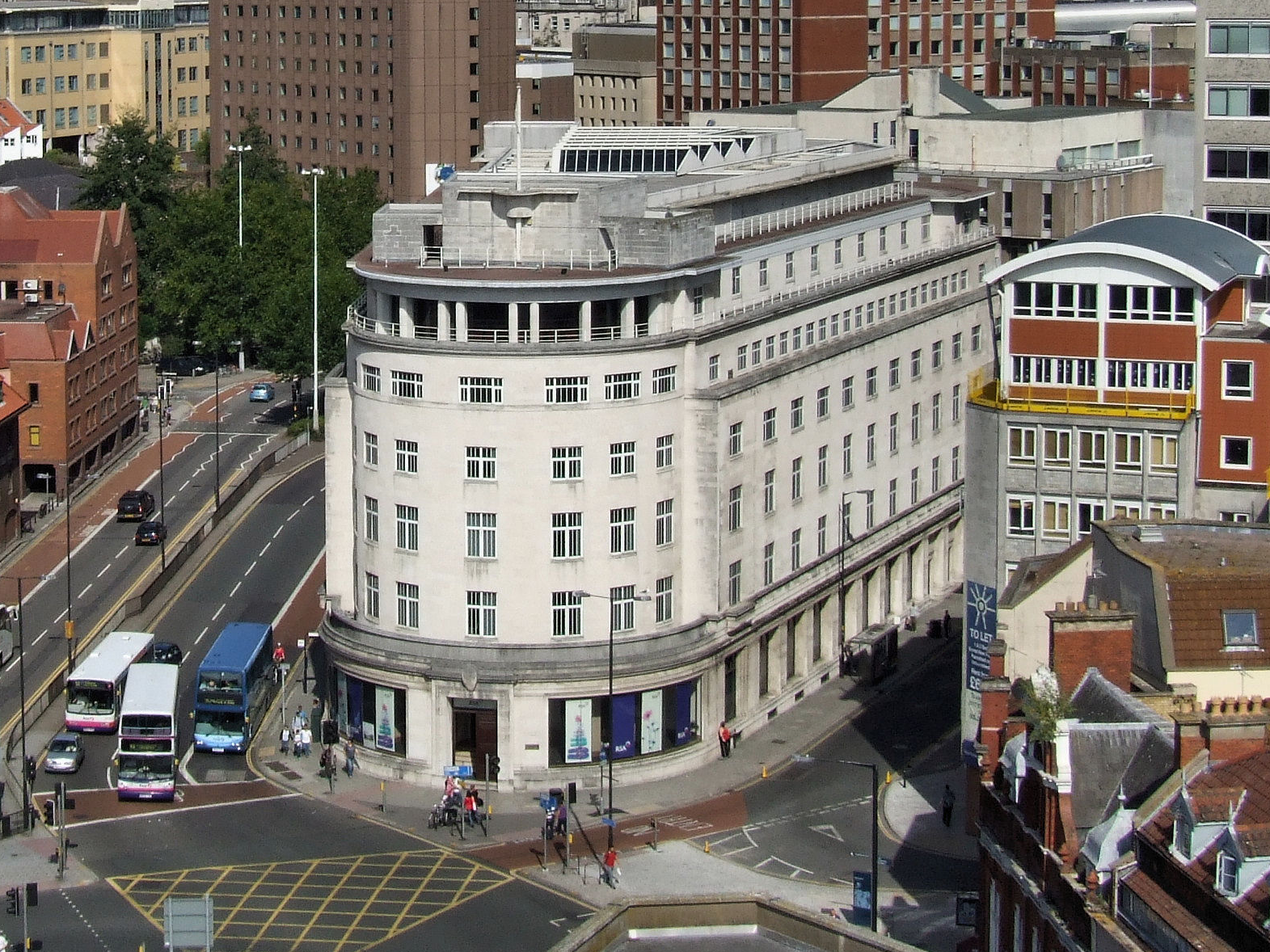
Former headquarters of the board, Electricity House, The Centre, Bristol

The board was responsible for the purchase of electricity from the electricity generator (the Central Electricity Generating Board from 1958) and its distribution and sale of electricity to customers. The key people on the board were: Chairman A.N. Irens (1964, 1967), Deputy Chairman S.F.C. Whitmore (1964, 1967), and full-time member C.E. Knight (1964, 1967).

The total number of customers supplied by the board over its operational life was:

Number of SWEB customers 1949–89
Year	1948/9	1960/1	1965/6	1970/1	1975/6	1978/9	1980/1	1985/6	1987/8	1988/9
No. of customers, 1000s	506	789	890	960	1040	1084	1107	1169	1206	1227

Electricity, in GWh, sold by South Western Electricity Board

=== Existing electricity suppliers taken over at nationalisation ===
The Electricity (Allocation of Undertakings to Area Boards) Order 1948 (SI 1948/484) transferred the electricity business of the following local authorities and private companies to the new board effective 31 March 1948.

==== Local authorities ====
- Barnstaple Corporation
- Bath Corporation
- Bridport Corporation
- Bristol Corporation
- Exeter Corporation
- Lyme Regis Corporation
- Plymouth Corporation
- Plympton St. Mary Rural District Council
- Taunton Corporation
- Tiverton Corporation
- Torquay Corporation

==== Private companies ====
- Bideford and District Electricity Supply Company
- Bridgwater and District Electric Supply Traction Company
- Brixham Gas and Electricity Company
- Bude Electric Supply Company
- Burnham and District Electric Supply Company
- Chudleigh Electric Light and Power Company
- Cornwall Electric Power Company
- Culm Valley Electric Supply Company
- Dawlish Electric Light and Power Company
- East Devon Electricity Company
- Exe Valley Electricity Company
- Holsworthy Electric Supply Company
- Ilfracombe Electric Light and Power Company
- Lynton and Lynmouth Electric Light Company
- Mid-Somerset Electric Supply Company
- Minehead Electric Supply Company
- North Somerset Electric Supply Company
- Paignton Electric Light and Power Company
- St. Austell and District Electric Lighting Power Company
- Salcombe Gas and Electricity Company
- Seaton and District Electric Light Company
- South Somerset and District Electricity Company
- Teignmouth Electric Lighting Company
- Wellington District Electricity Company
- West Devon Electric Supply Company
- Weston-super-Mare and District Electric Supply Company

== Company timeline ==
In 1990, SWEB Energy was formed from the privatisation of the South Western Electricity Board.

In 1995, SWEB Energy was bought by the American utility Southern Company.

In 1999, the company was bought by the PPL Corporation distribution company Western Power Distribution and was split into two. Western Power itself (officially known as WPD South West) dealt with the local distribution, metering and substations, and the 'SWEB' brand name was continued as a retail energy utility.

In June 1999, SWEB was sold to French-owned EDF Energy. The acquisition was authorised by the European Commission in Jul.1999. EDF discontinued the 'SWEB' brand name on 5 June 2006.
