= Kensington Baptist Church =

Baptist church in Bristol, England

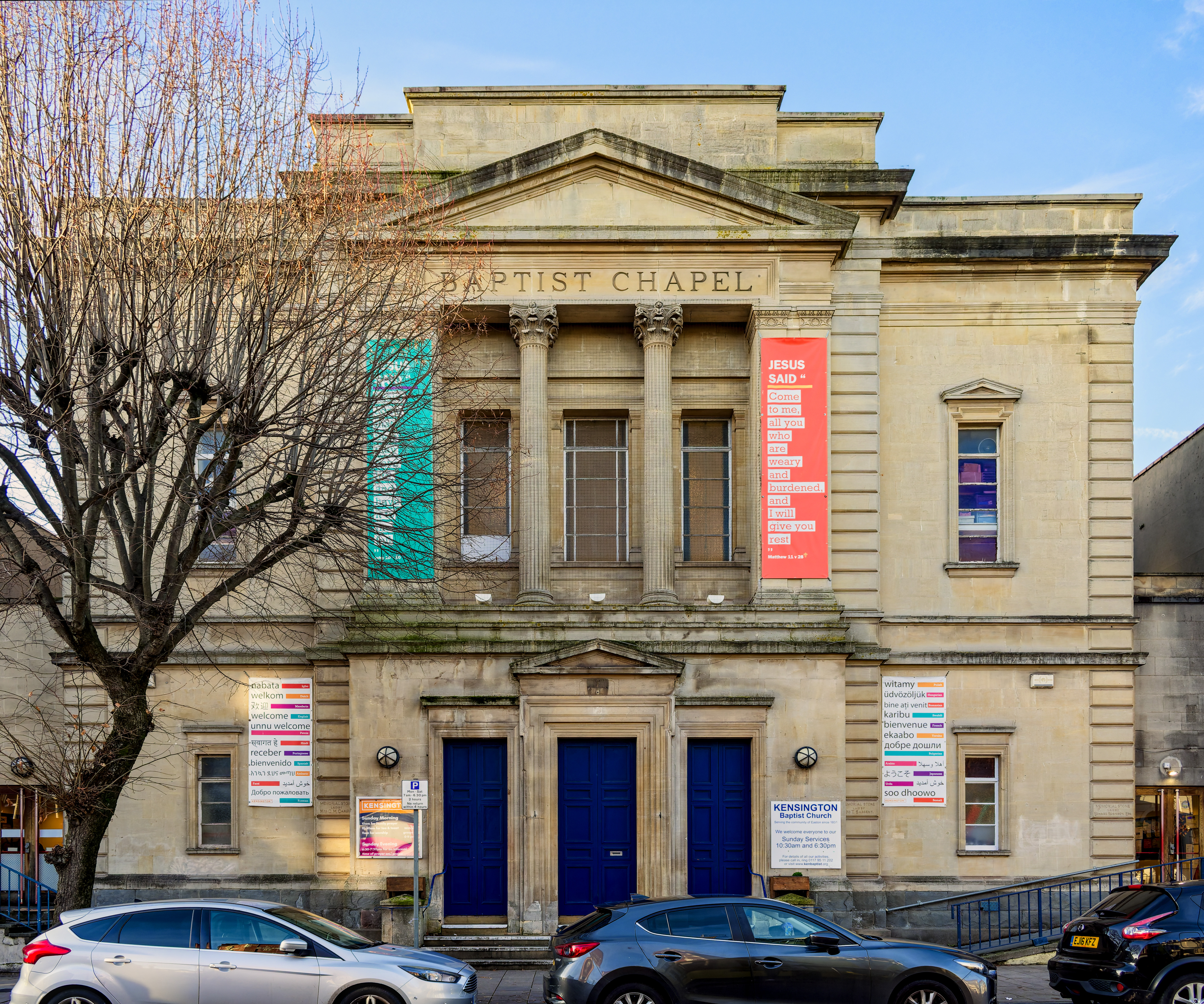
- Kensington Baptist Church
- 51.46460°N 2.57033°W
- OS grid reference: ST 60474 74116
- Location: Easton, Bristol
- Country: England
- Denomination: Baptist
- Website: kenbaptist.org

History
- Founded: 25 July 1831

Architecture
- Architect: Thomas Lennox Watson
- Architectural type: Neoclassical
- Construction cost: £7,046

Listed Building – Grade II
- Official name: Kensington Baptist Chapel
- Designated: 30 December 1994
- Reference no.: 1208763

Kensington Baptist Church (also known as Kensington Baptist Chapel or the Kensington Tabernacle) is located on Stapleton Road in the Easton area of Bristol, England. Established in 1831, the congregation originally worshipped in Thrissell Street before moving to its current Grade II listed building in 1888. The church was an early adopter of the multi-site church model in Bristol and has long-standing community and youth ministries.

== History ==
The congregation was founded on 25 July 1831. Its first place of worship was in the Thrissell Street Chapel, which was then the only Baptist chapel in the parish of St Philip and Jacob. This original building was destroyed by fire on 20 February 1855, believed to have been caused by over-heated gas pipes in the singing gallery. While the main chapel was gutted, the adjoining schoolrooms were saved, and the congregation met at Castle Green Chapel during the reconstruction works in 1856. By 1877, under the Rev. W. Osborne, the chapel had been renovated and the Sunday school had doubled in extent, though the building remained inadequate for the dense population of the area.

In 1881, the Rev. Cornelius Griffiths began a pastorate that saw membership grow to 316. In 1886, land was purchased from the Maule's Nursery Estate on Stapleton Road. The new chapel opened on 10 April 1888 with sermons by the Rev. Charles Spurgeon of Greenwich, son of Charles Haddon Spurgeon. In June that same year, the name "Kensington" was formally adopted to distinguish itself from the Stapleton Road Congregational Chapel. The church was officially registered as the replacement for Thrissel Street Chapel for the solemnisation of marriages on 3 July 1888.

The church maintained close ties with East London evangelical work through pastors like the Rev. Douglas Brown and the Rev. D. Hayes in the early 20th century. In 1968, the church left the Baptist Union of Great Britain over doctrinal differences.

Under Pastor Andrew Paterson (1988–2012), the church underwent modernisation and became the first to use the multi-site church model in Bristol. During a 2002 refurbishment, the congregation met at Riverside Leisure Centre, leading to the experimental church plant of Riverside Christian Fellowship from 2003 to 2006. In 2007, 50 members went to revitalise Headley Park Church in Bishopsworth. In 2009, two satellite congregations were launched: Bristol City Centre Church (BC3), which met in a Premier Inn, and The Village Church in Emersons Green. BC3 eventually merged with Broadmead Baptist Church in 2019.

== Architecture and fittings ==
Designed by Thomas Lennox Watson of Glasgow, the church is a Neoclassical building described as Grecian in style. The symmetrical frontage features a broken-forward pediment and a first-floor distyle in antis Corinthian loggia. The base is constructed of Pennant stone, while the upper walls are Box ground Bath stone. The building was constructed at a cost of £7,046. Internally, the church comprises two principal spaces: the Muller Hall, located nearest to Seymour Road, and the Community Hall, which sits closest to Stapleton Road.

The interior measures 80 feet long by 54 feet wide and contains galleries on all four sides supported by columns. The floor is inclined toward the platform at the Seymour Road. Modern renovations in 2002 replaced pews with chairs and added a lift. An organ made by W. G. Vowles was installed in 1900 with funds raised through subscription.

In recent years, the church has undertaken internal and external architectural interventions to support its expanding community work. This included the insertion of new administrative offices within the upper voids of the existing stairwells, accessible from the mezzanine level. Maintenance projects have also been required to repair delaminating Pennant stone on the exterior and replace deteriorating timber windows in the Community Hall. To combat local anti-social behaviour and prevent loitering, security was improved through the installation of taller railings and gated access to the side steps facing Stapleton Road.

== Ministry and community activities ==
Historically, the church has been a host for community outreach and events. In 1887, a Japanese Bazaar featuring lanterns and gymnastic performances was held to fund the building work and alleviate outstanding debt. In the early 20th century, the church was also known for musical renderings, including Mendelssohn's Elijah. The church also has a history of association with the St John Ambulance Brigade, hosting their annual parade services in the 1930s. During World War II, it hosted appeals for the British Red Cross and sent items to the 15th (Scottish) Infantry Division, where its former minister, the Rev. J. I. Carlyle Litt, served as chaplain.

Youth ministry was a major focus of the church in the 1950s, when rallies led by evangelist Don Summers attracted over 1,200 attendees. The church also operated a Parents-Teachers Fellowship in the 1950s to engage the families of Sunday school students. By 2024, the church continued to serve as a multicultural facility with around 200 regular worshippers, though had experienced issues with anti-social behaviour in the area.

== See also ==
- List of churches in Bristol
- Grade II listed buildings in Bristol
