= 35 King Street, Bristol =

Building in Bristol, England

35 King Street
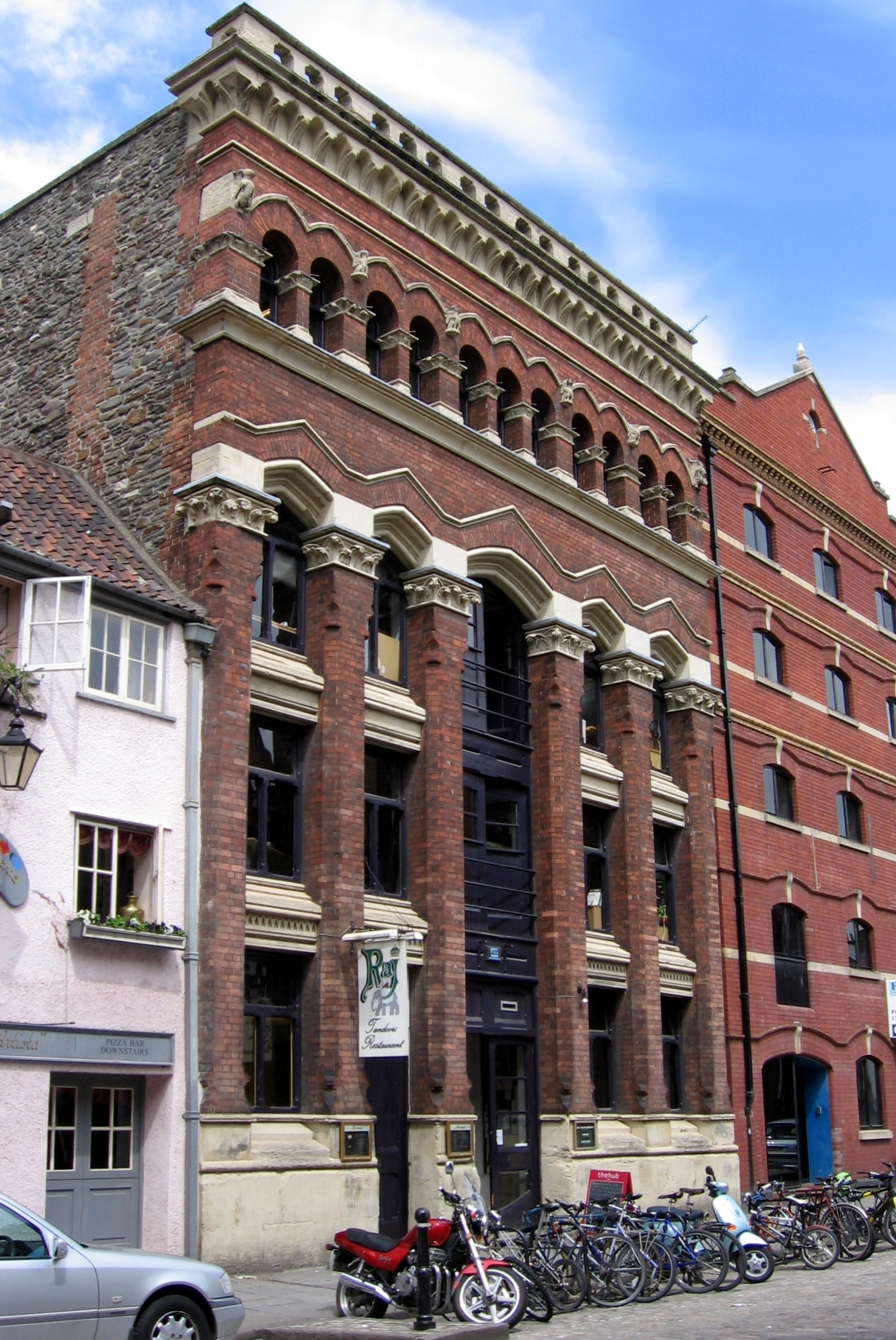

- Location within Bristol

General information
- Location: Bristol, England
- Coordinates: 51.4522°N 2.5950°W
- Completed: 1870

The 35 King Street (grid reference ST587727) is a former cork warehouse in King Street, Bristol, England, currently housing an Indian restaurant and serviced office space.

It was built around 1870 and is an example of the Bristol Byzantine style.

It has been designated by English Heritage as a grade II listed building.

== See also ==
- Grade II listed buildings in Bristol
