= Former Gardiners offices =

Building in Bristol, England

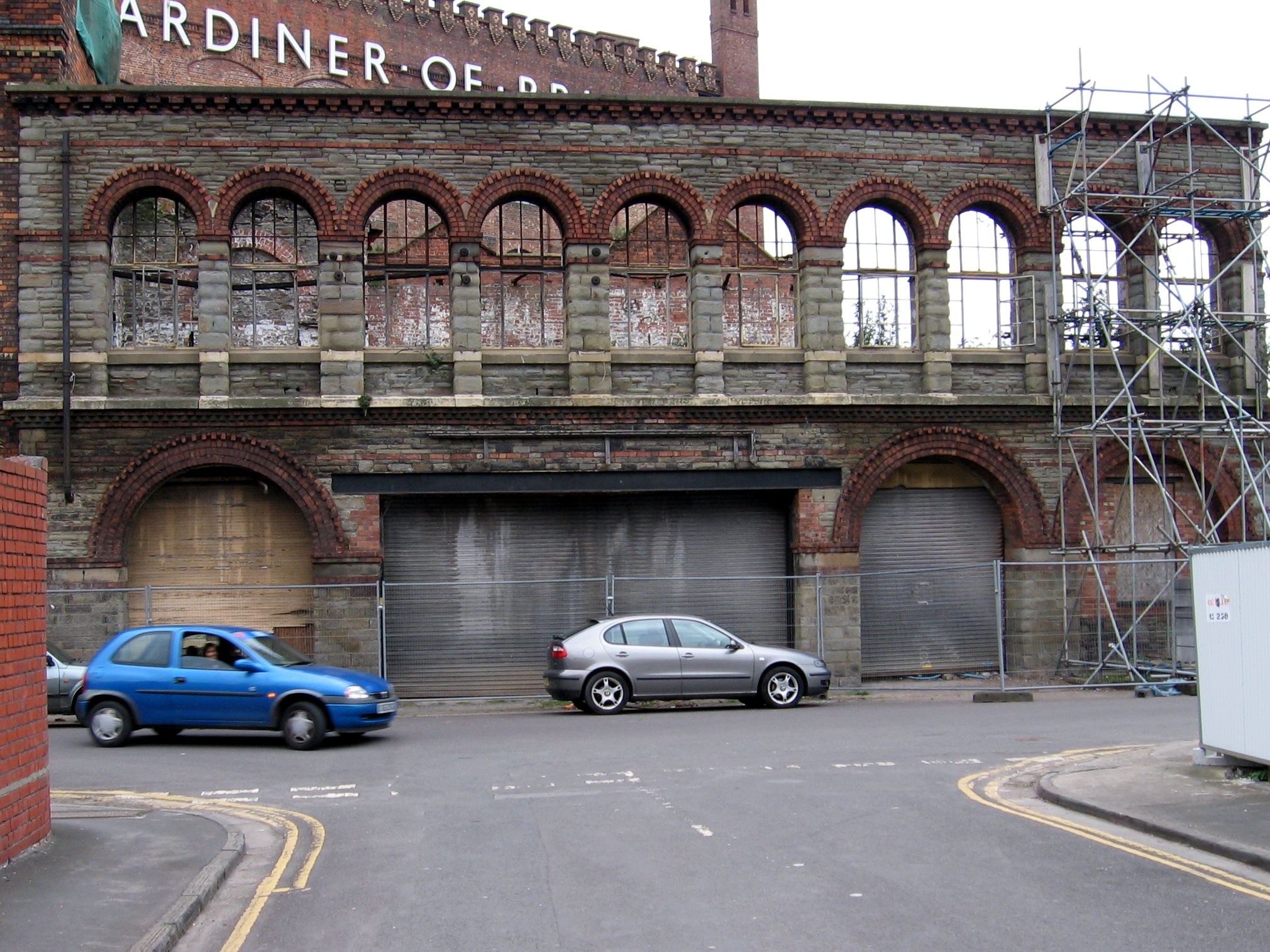

- Location within Bristol

General information
- Location: Bristol, England
- Coordinates: 51.4541°N 2.5826°W
- Construction started: 1865
- Completed: 1867

The Former Gardiners offices (grid reference ST596729) is on Old Bread Street, Bristol, England.

It was built in 1865-7 by Foster and Wood and is an example of the Bristol Byzantine style.

It has been designated by English Heritage as a grade II listed building.

== See also ==
- Grade II listed buildings in Bristol
