= Woodlands Christian Centre =

Church in Bristol, England

Woodlands Christian Centre / Woodlands Church
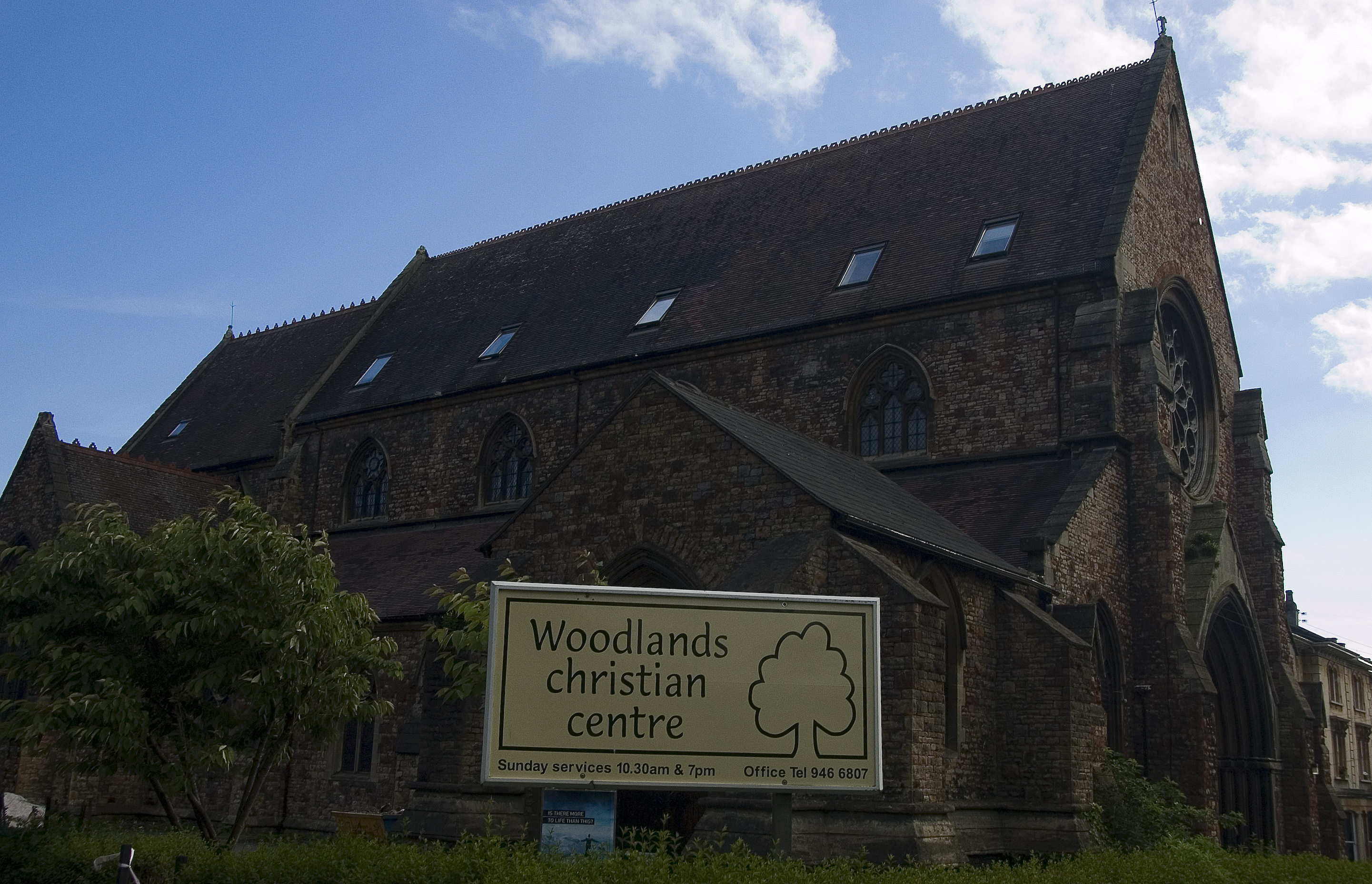
- Woodlands Christian Centre, from Woodland Road.

- Location within Bristol

Religion
- Affiliation: Evangelical
- District: Clifton

Location
- Location: Bristol, England
- Interactive map of Woodlands Christian Centre / Woodlands Church
- Coordinates: 51.46171°N 2.6056°W

Website
- Official Website

Woodlands Church is an evangelical church in Bristol, England. It is situated on the corner of Belgrave Road and Woodland Road, near the University of Bristol campus in Clifton.

== Historic status ==
Previously The Church of St Mary the Virgin, the building which was constructed in 1870–71 (see Grade II listed buildings in Bristol) has a Grade II listing by Historic England.

== See also ==
- Churches in Bristol
