= Electricity House, Bristol =

Art Deco building in central Bristol, England

Electricity House
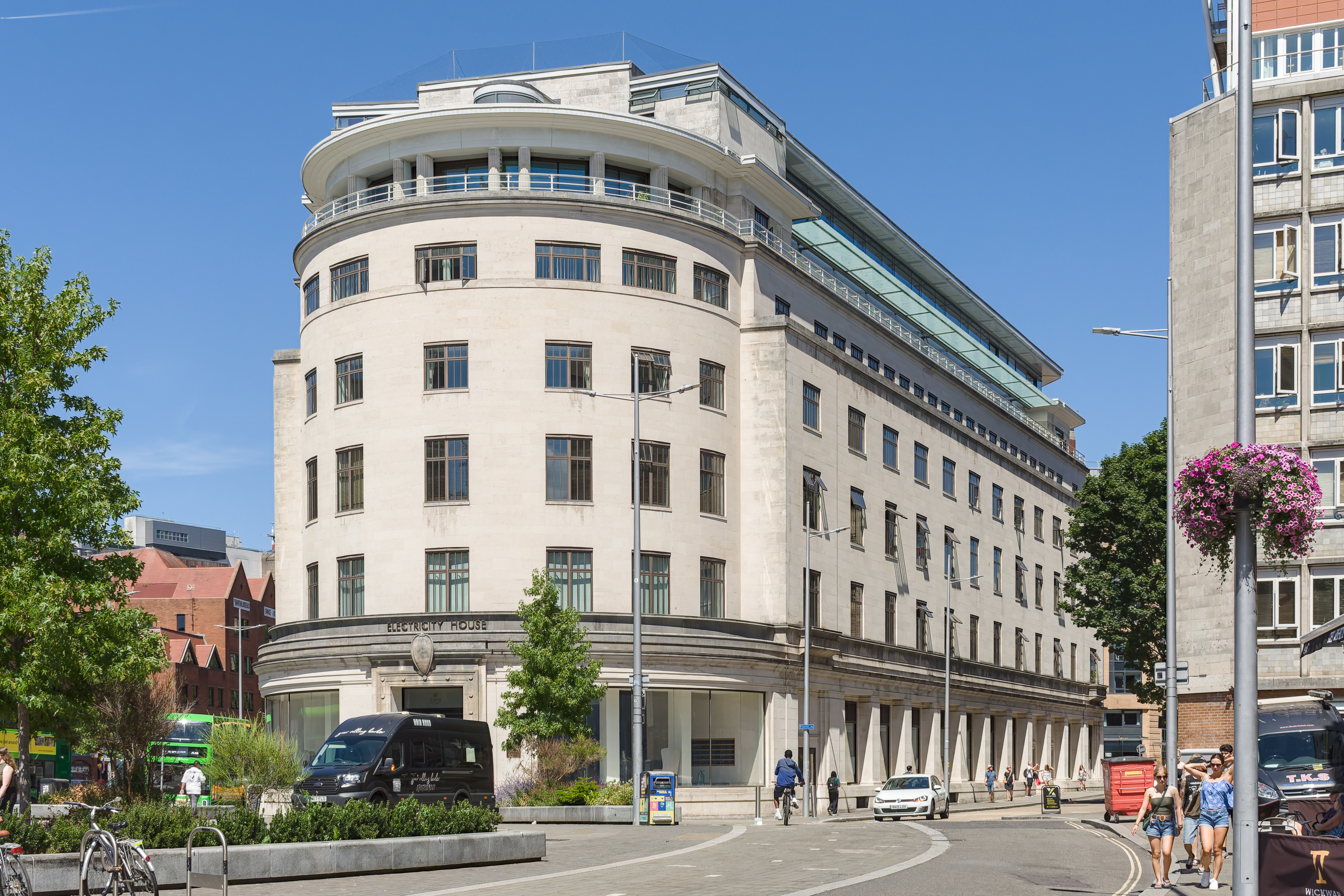
- Former names: West Gate

General information
- Status: Completed
- Type: Originally offices; now residential and mixed-use
- Architectural style: Art Deco
- Location: Rupert Street and Quay Street, Bristol, England, Electricity House, Colston Avenue, BS1 4TB
- Coordinates: 51.4558°N 2.5957°W
- Construction started: 1935
- Completed: 1937

Technical details
- Floor count: 6
- Floor area: 90,000 sq ft

Design and construction
- Architect: Giles Gilbert Scott
- Developer: Crest Nicholson
- Designations

Listed Building – Grade II
- Official name: West Gate
- Designated: 18 May 1981
- Reference no.: 1052272

Electricity House, formerly known as West Gate, is a Grade II-listed Art Deco building at the former junction of Rupert Street and Quay Street and facing The Centre in central Bristol, England. Designed by Giles Gilbert Scott, it was constructed between 1935 and 1937 for the Bristol Corporation Electricity Department, but was not fully completed or occupied until 1948 due to wartime requisitioning. Electricity House has since been converted into a residential building following redevelopment in 2016.

== History ==
Commissioned to accommodate the expanding Bristol Corporation Electricity Department, Electricity House was built on a site cleared in the 1930s near the former Demerara House. The building was requisitioned during the Second World War for aircraft component production, delaying its completion until 1948, when it became the headquarters of the newly formed South Western Electricity Board.

In the early 2000s, the building, by then known as West Gate, was owned by Aviva Investors’ APIA Regional Office Fund. In 2013, it was purchased by developer Crest Nicholson, who proposed a residential-led, mixed-use redevelopment as part of the Nelson Street Regeneration Area. The refurbishment, which started in 2014, won the Housebuilder magazine 'Best Refurbishment Project' award in 2016 for Crest Nicholson.

== Design ==
Electricity House is a prominent example of 1930s Art Deco in Bristol, where the style is relatively uncommon. Constructed of Portland stone ashlar, the building features a symmetrical curved façade, deep-plan interior, and a recessed upper storey forming a loggia. The entrance is framed by full-width plate-glass windows, an architrave with roundels, and a central cartouche.

The interior includes a curved staircase and light-filled atrium, restored as part of the redevelopment completed in 2016.

== See also ==
- Grade II listed buildings in Bristol
