= Former Bristol and West Building =

Bristol and West Building
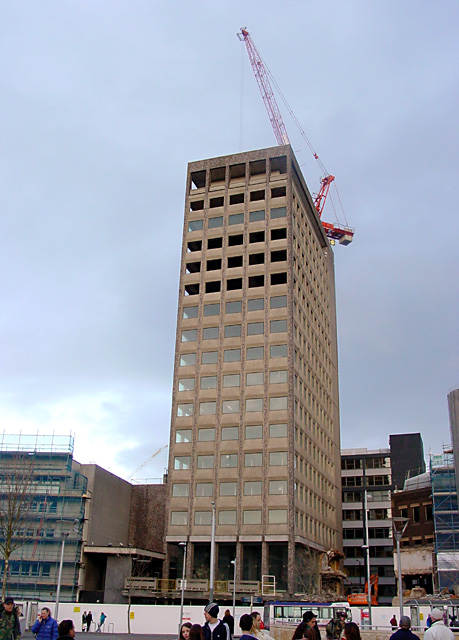
- Interactive map of the Bristol and West Building area

General information
- Status: Completed
- Type: offices
- Location: Bristol, England
- Coordinates: 51.4524°N 2.5966°W
- Completed: 1967
- Renovated: 2006-2009

Height
- Roof: 61 m (200 ft)

Technical details
- Floor count: 17

The former Bristol and West Building on Marsh Street/St Augustine's Parade, Bristol and facing onto The Centre, was built in 1967 by Alec French and partners.

Rising 61 metres with 17 stories, the building was formerly used as the headquarters of the Bristol and West until early 2006. It was clad in granite-chipped pre-cast concrete.

In the early 2000s plans to demolish and replace with a 23-storey building, the tallest in Bristol, were proposed, but rejected.

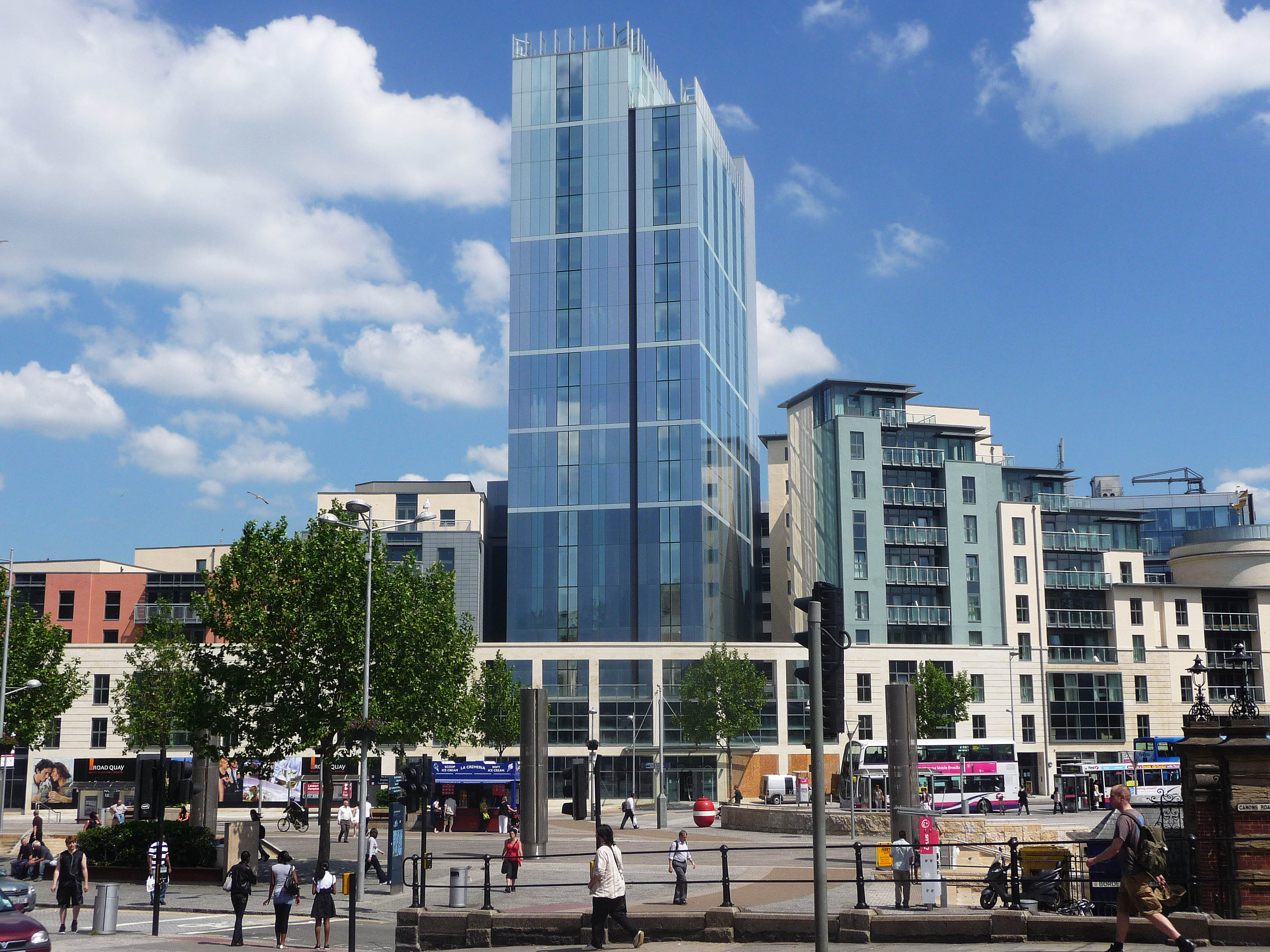
Radisson Blu Bristol

Since then, major renovations have been carried out, including re-cladding in blue-tinted glass panels of different shades to give the illusion the building merges into the sky. After several delays the building reopened in May 2009 as a 176-room hotel operated by Radisson SAS. In addition to the hotel, the site also includes residential apartments and shops.

== See also ==
- List of tallest buildings and structures in Bristol

Media related to Bristol and West Building at Wikimedia Commons
