= 37 and 39 Jamaica Street, Bristol =

Building in Bristol, England

37 and 39 Jamaica Street
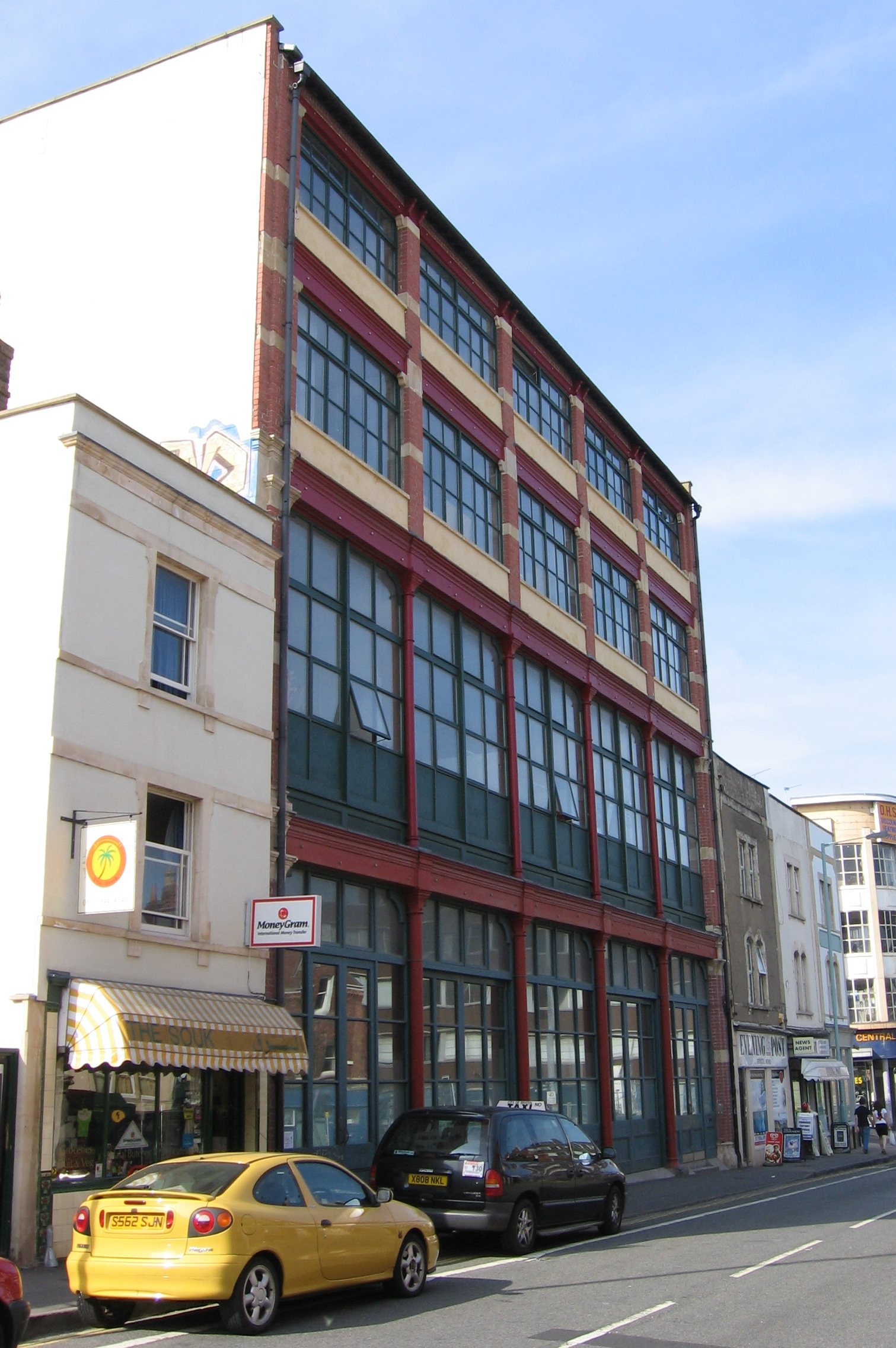

- Location within Bristol

General information
- Location: Bristol, England
- Coordinates: 51.462664°N 2.590477°W
- Completed: 1905 (additional floors 1909)

37 - 39 Jamaica Street is the address of Jamaica Street Studios and KIT FORM, previously a historic carriage-works in Jamaica Street, Stokes Croft, Bristol.

The top 3 floors of the building are inhabited by artist-led Jamaica Street Studios, home to 30 artist studios and over 30 artists, for over 30 years.

Jamaica Street Studios is a Community Interest Company (CIC) meaning that they can only use their assets to fulfil their not-for-profit aims of providing affordable artist studios and expanding access to the arts.

Since 2023 the ground floor has been run by the artist group and a small team as the collaborative, creative, artist-led space KIT FORM. The space has been used for exhibitions, workshops, film-screenings, events and live music.

In 2024 Jamaica Street Studios launched a Crowdfunder campaign to purchase 37 - 39 Jamaica Street and save it from being put on the open market. Having secured £500,400 from the Community Ownership Fund, it was necessary to fundraise at least £100,000 to unlock the fund. With other 1000 supporters, the studios were able to fundraise over £106,000 through Crowdfunder UK. This meant that they were able to purchase the building and secure a legacy of community ownership, protecting the building as a community space, for the arts, forever.

== History ==
It was originally built in 1905 as a two-storey building, but a further two floors were later added.

After the hulk HMS Daedalus was sold for scrap in 1911, 37 Jamaica street became the home of the Bristol Royal Naval Reserve unit, before moving to the 24-class sloop HMS Flying Fox in the 1920s.

Between 1975 and 2001 it was occupied by Powred Heating & Burner Spares, a local supplier of parts for central heating systems.

It has been designated by English Heritage as a grade II listed building.

== See also ==
- Grade II listed buildings in Bristol
