= Bristol & West =

Former UK mutual building society

Bristol & West plc
- Bristol & West logo
- Trade name: Bristol & West
- Formerly: Bristol, West of England and South Wales Permanent Building Society
- Company type: originally: mutual building society until July 1997, then: public limited bank, now: banking division of Bank of Ireland
- Traded as: LSE: BWSA
- ISIN: GB0000510205
- Industry: Finance and investments
- Founded: 1850; 176 years ago in Bristol, England
- Defunct: 2009; 17 years ago
- Fate: Sold and divested (1997-2005), liquidated (2023)
- Headquarters: One Temple Back East, Temple Quay, Bristol, England, BS1 6DX, United Kingdom
- Area served: United Kingdom
- Key people: John Burke (CEO); David McGowan (director)
- Products: Mortgages, savings
- Services: Financial services
- Operating income: £0.7m (2010); £0.7m (2009)
- Net income: ▼£2.6m (2010); £81.8m (2009)
- Total assets: £129.7m (2010)
- Total equity: £82.2m (2010)
- Owner: Bank of Ireland
- Parent: Bank of Ireland UK Holdings plc
- Website: BankofIrelandUK.com/bristol-west-plc

Bristol & West (B&W) was a former mutual building society in the United Kingdom (UK), one of the first to be demutualised to become a publicly traded bank in 1997. Bristol & West had its headquarters in Bristol, England, UK. Bristol & West became a division of the UK arm of the Bank of Ireland in 1997.

== History ==
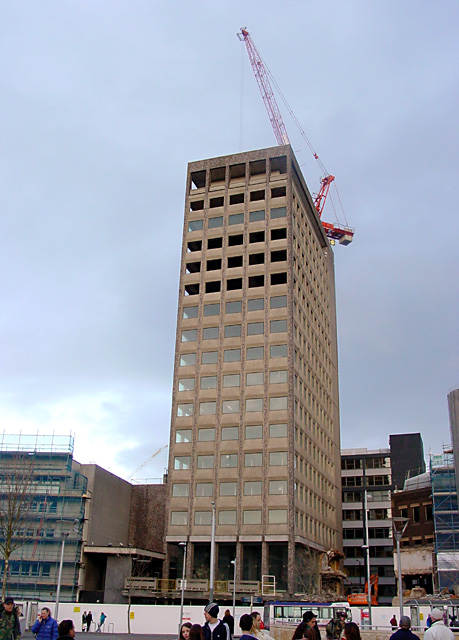
Bristol & West former headquarters being converted into a hotel in 2006

The society was founded as the "Bristol, West of England and South Wales Permanent Building Society" in 1850.

By 1996, Bristol & West was the ninth largest building society in the United Kingdom, with 1.1 million customers.

After the Building Societies Act 1986 relaxed rules on building societies and permitted them to demutualise and convert into banks, a number of building societies did so. In July 1997, Bristol & West demutualised and was acquired by the Bank of Ireland for £600m (€882m), becoming a UK division of the Bank of Ireland, but maintaining its operations and branch network under the existing Bristol & West brand identity.

In December 2003, the UK's Financial Services Authority (FSA) fined the Bank of Ireland owned Bristol & West subsidiary "Chase de Vere Financial Solutions" for the "approval and issue of a misleading direct offer promotion".

In 2005, the Bank of Ireland sold its Bristol & West plc savings and investment business to the Britannia Building Society for £150 million. The deal also included Bristol & West's 97 branches, as well as its direct savings business. The sale did not include the Bristol & West brand name, which was retained by the Bank of Ireland. Existing Bristol & West account holders were transferred to a Britannia-branded product, and all branches assumed the Britannia brand identity.

The Bank of Ireland continued to offer B&W mortgages to intermediaries, packagers, and direct customers, through the Bristol & West brand, at its main processing centres in Bristol and Solihull. That meant the closure of a number of smaller mortgage processing centres throughout the country. In 2008, the half-year profit from the mortgage business was £52 million.

On 8 January 2009, the Bank of Ireland announced to the stock market that it would close its Solihull and Reading processing centres (the Reading Centre processed Bank of Ireland mortgages only) and, as of 9 January 2009, Bristol & West mortgages would cease accepting new customers, though the brand would continue for existing mortgage customers. Also in 2009, the Bristol & West business was transferred to Bank of Ireland: it became a shell company, and stopped accepting new customers.

The Bristol & West brand name has since been replaced by the Bank of Ireland brand. Bristol & West plc shares were still publicly traded on the London Stock Exchange until June 2023, when the Bank of Ireland decided to redeem the outstanding Bristol & West preference shares and liquidate Bristol & West plc.

== Arms ==
Coat of arms of Bristol and West Building Society
Notes Granted 25 February 1939 Crest On a wreath of the colours in front of two arms embowed in saltire the hand to the dexter holding a round shield and that to the sinister three sprigs of thrift a rock all Proper. Escutcheon Per chevron Sable and Gules in chief a balance Or and in base a castle triple towered Argent. Motto Security through thrift
