= Printers Devil, Bristol =

Pub in Bristol, England

Printers Devil
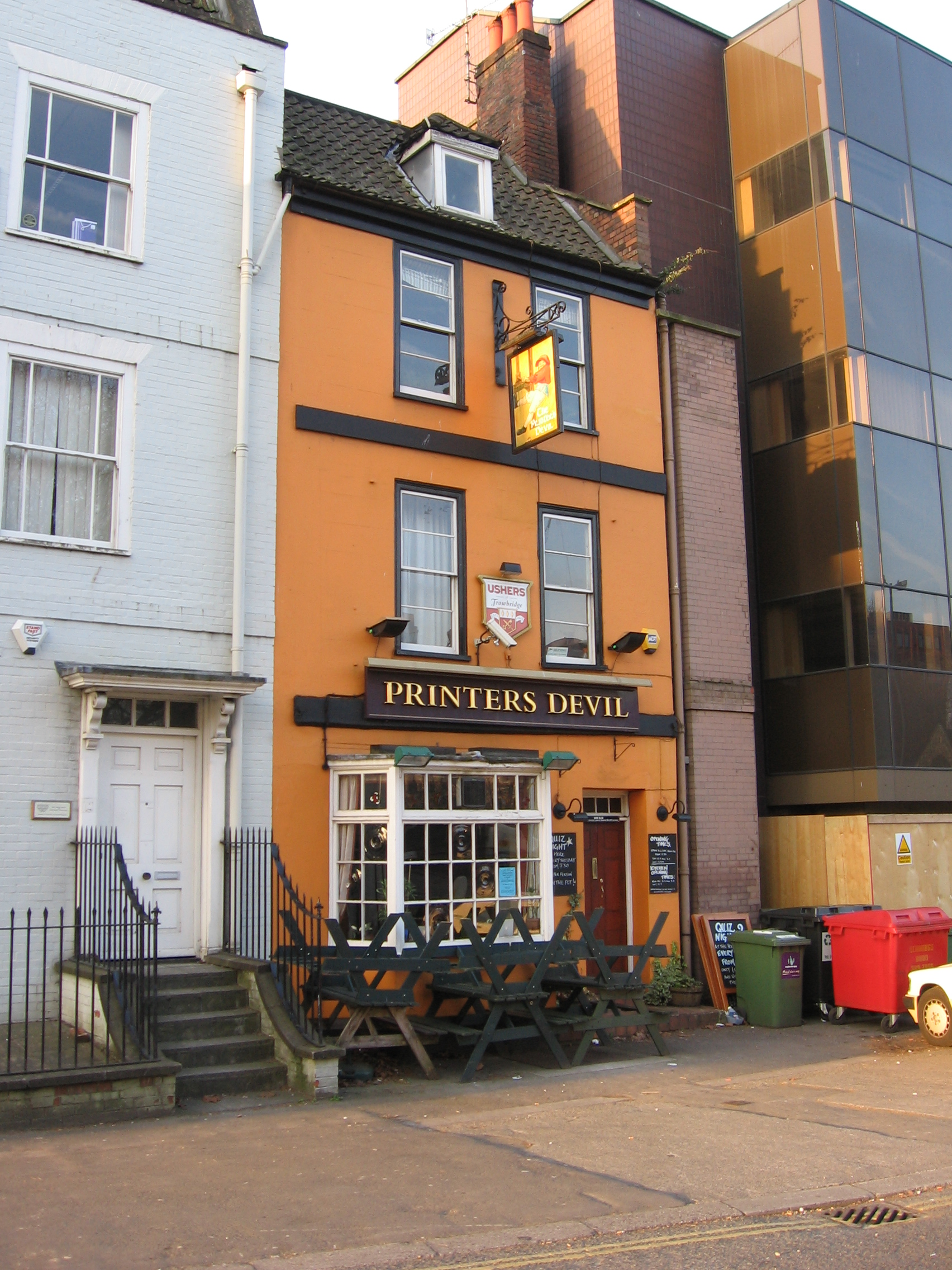

- Location within Bristol

General information
- Location: Bristol, England
- Coordinates: 51.454114°N 2.582817°W

The Printers Devil (grid reference ST595729) was a historic pub in Bristol, England.

It was built in the late 18th century as a pub, and used to be known as the Queen's Head.

It is a grade II listed building.

Since July 2008, the pub has been closed.
