= Bristol Cenotaph =

War memorial in Bristol, England

Coordinates: 51.45367°N 2.59735°W

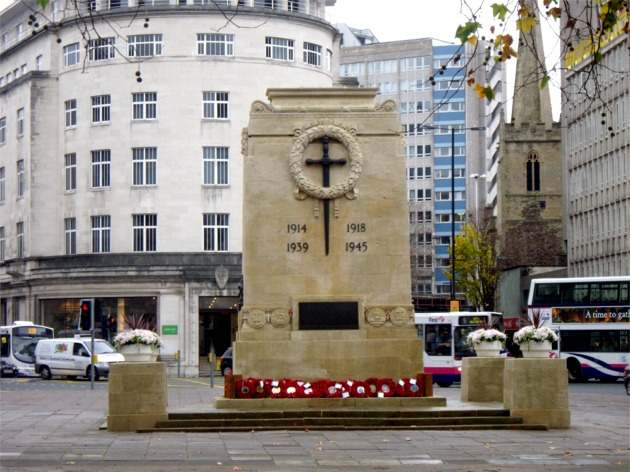
Bristol Cenotaph

Bristol Cenotaph is a war memorial at the north end of Magpie Park, in Bristol, erected in 1932. It is a Grade II listed building.

The project was controversial, and the memorial was one of the last built by a major British city after the First World War, being completed after the Arch of Remembrance in Leicester in 1925, the Coventry War Memorial in 1927, and the Liverpool Cenotaph in 1930. Unusually, it was designed by a local female architect Eveline Dew Blacker, with her business partner Harry Heathman.

== Background ==
Approximately 60,000 men from Bristol enlisted in the British armed forces in First World War, and around 4,500 were killed. After the armistice, Bristol City Council established a committee to consider proposals for a war memorial, but little progress was made for years, with opinions divided between those wanting a purely commemorative structure and those preferring a more practical project, such as a memorial hospital. It proved difficult to raise sufficient money for a more ambitious project, and the committee eventually decided on a commemorative structure.

The siting of the memorial was also controversial, with sites proposed near Bristol Cathedral, and others including the Old Market, The Downs, the Horsefair. Eventually a decision was made to make space by removing a statue of Queen Victoria, but that proposal was not implemented. Eventually a site at the north end of Colston Avenue was chosen, on an area were the River Frome had been culverted in the 1890s.

A public fundraising campaign raised £1,700, and designs were sought from local architects, with a committee selecting the three best from the 18 submitted for a public vote. All three were heavily influenced by the Cenotaph in Whitehall, designed by Edwin Lutyens.

The vote chose a scheme proposed by the firm of Harry Heathman and Eveline Dew Blacker, ahead of a proposal from Charles Roy Beechcroft and another from Adrian E. Powell (who later designed Bristol's All-Electric House).

== Description ==
The memorial comprises a 6 metres (20 ft) high rectangular stone slab constructed from shelly limestone ashlars with a moulded top, bearing a stone sarcophagus, with bundles of spears or fasces laid down to either side and a console at each end. The main slab stands on a stone plinth with one step, positioned on a stone base with three steps. The base has four stone pylons, one at each corner, with each bearing a bronze lion's head. Positioned outside the base are four bronze lamp standards.

The longer main faces of the central memorial face to the north and south, each bearing a carved stone wreath above a bronze sword, originally gilded, with the dates 1914 and 1939 to the left and 1918 and 1945 to the right, together with carved stone medallions bearing the arms of the city of Bristol, the British Army, the Royal Navy and the Royal Air Force, with a large central bronze plaque bearing an inscription.

The plaque on the north face reads SACRED TO THE MEMORY / OF BRISTOL'S SONS AND / DAUGHTERS, WHO MADE / THE SUPREME SACRIFICE and in smaller type "THEY DIED THAT MANKIND MIGHT LEARN TO LIVE IN PEACE". The plaque on the south face bears the first and third verses from the hymn "O Valiant Hearts", reading O VALIANT HEARTS WHO TO YOUR GLORY CAME THROUGH DUST OF CONFLICT AND THROUGH BATTLE FLAME: TRANQUIL YOU LIE, YOUR KNIGHTLY VIRTUE PROVED, YOUR MEMORY HALLOWED IN THE LAND YOU LOVED: SPLENDID YOU PASSED THE GREAT SURRENDER MADE INTO THE LIGHT THAT NEVERMORE SHALL FADE. ALL YOU HAD HOPED FOR, ALL YOU HAD, YOU GAVE TO SAVE MANKIND, YOURSELVES YOU SCORNED TO SAVE, accompanied by two torches, turned upside down.

The shorter sides, to east and west, are plainer, each bearing two medallions, carved with flower emblems, one each for England, Scotland, Ireland and Wales, and a bronze representation of the city's arms.

The Cenotaph was unveiled 26 June 1932 by Field Marshal Sir William Birdwood. The dates "1939" and "1945" were later added to commemorate the dead in the Second World War. It became a Grade II listed building in 1977.
