= The King's Head, Bristol =

Listed pub in England

The King's Head
- The pub (centre) in 2025

General information
- Type: Public house; originally a house
- Location: 60 Victoria Street, Redcliffe, Bristol, England
- Coordinates: 51.451892°N 2.587150°W
- Year built: Mid-17th century
- Renovated: c. 1865 (refurnished); 19th and 20th century (added)
- Owner: D. R. Properties Ltd

Design and construction
- Designations

Listed Building – Grade II
- Official name: Kings Head Inn
- Designated: 8 December 1972
- Reference no.: 1291662

The King's Head is a Grade II listed public house on Victoria Street in Redcliffe, a district of Bristol, England. Originating as a house in the mid-17th century and later converted into a pub, it was extensively refitted around 1865 and subsequently enlarged during the 19th and 20th centuries. The pub is included in the Campaign for Real Ale (CAMRA)'s National Inventory of Historic Pub Interiors with a three-star rating, and its interior is regarded by CAMRA as being of "outstanding national historic importance".

== History ==
The building originated as a house dating from the mid-17th century and was later converted into a public house. It was extensively refitted around 1865, with further additions made during the 19th and 20th centuries.

On 8 December 1972, the King's Head was designated a Grade II listed building. It was included in the Campaign for Real Ale (CAMRA)'s National Inventory of Historic Pub Interiors before the inventory's grading system was revised. Under the revised scheme, it is rated three stars and its interior is regarded as being of "outstanding national historic importance". The pub retains a mid-Victorian bar-back which CAMRA identifies as the second-oldest surviving example in the country. As of October 2026 the freehold was owned by D. R. Properties Ltd and the pub was independently operated.

== Architecture ==
=== Exterior ===
The building is a rendered, double-depth structure with a pantile roof and red-brick chimney stacks at the eaves. Arranged over three storeys above a cellar, it has a narrow single-window frontage. The ground floor retains a 19th-century pub front, slightly projected from the main façade, with an entrance on the left-hand side and a large canted window. The upper floors are lit by sash windows with margin glazing, while the date "Circa 1660" is painted on the front elevation. To the rear are a doorway, a large four-pane fixed window and further sash windows with margin glazing.

=== Interior ===
The interior retains a bar counter dating from around 1865, featuring rectangular panelling and console brackets, although the counter top was replaced in 1998. Fixed bench seating survives between the counter and the front window. The long, narrow single-room layout also survives. The bar-back is characterised by broad, shallow arches framing plain mirrored glass, with attached columns set on a white marble shelf and decorated with capitals incorporating stylised foliage. Behind the columns are glazed panels with gold interlocking circles on a green background. A prominent stained-glass panel advertising "Burton Ales and Dublin Stout", signed by Fred Brean, also survives.

The arched design of the bar-back continues into the rear part of the pub, above which is a series of narrow rectangular panels advertising products including cordials, London gin, Jamaica rum, Irish and Scotch whiskies, French brandy, port, sherry and cigars. A surviving gas-pressure gauge is incorporated into the bar-back. In the rear section, a former bar counter and part of the bar-back were replaced during the later 19th century by a rectangular seating area with high-backed fixed benches. Known as the "Tramcar Bar", this partitioned snug is thought to date from around 1900 and is enclosed by timber partitions incorporating glazed panels.

Other historic fittings include bell pushes and a gas fitting mounted above one of the bench backs for a lamp and cigar lighter. Matchboard dado panelling survives along the left-hand wall, while the ladies' and gentlemen's toilets at the rear are separated by a timber partition. The insertion of the snug appears to have shortened the original bar counter, which formerly extended to the rear of the building.

== See also ==
- Grade II listed buildings in Bristol
