= Shakespeare Inn, Bristol =

Historic public house on Victoria Street, Bristol, England

Shakespeare Inn
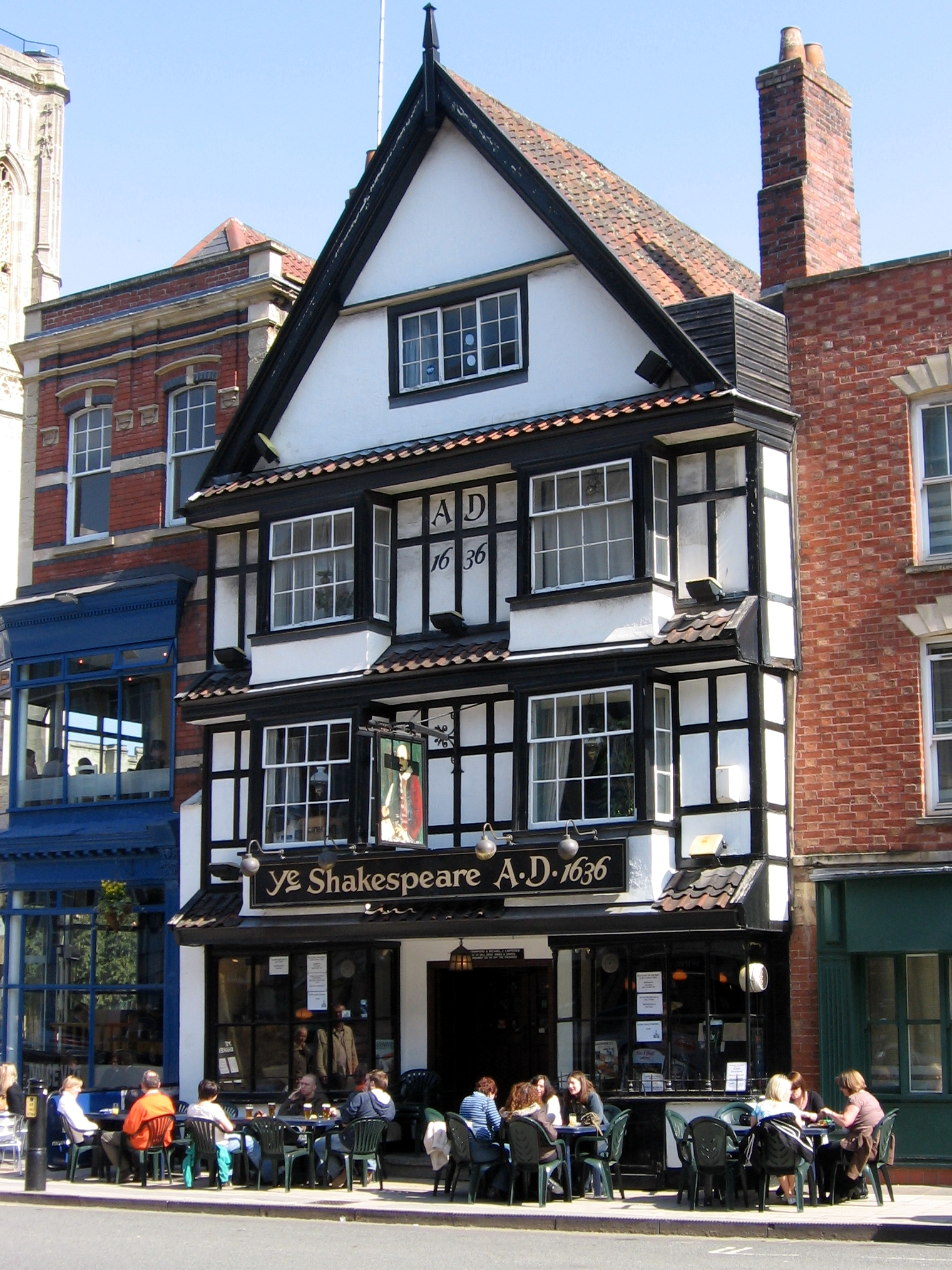

- Location within Bristol

General information
- Location: Bristol, England
- Coordinates: 51.451620°N 2.587506°W
- Completed: 17th century

Shakespeare Inn is a 17th-century pub at 78 Victoria Street, in Bristol, England. It is a timber-framed house, dated 1636 on the front, which was extensively restored in 1950, under the direction of F. L. Hannam, and re-roofed in 1992. It has been designated by English Heritage as a grade II listed building.
