= The King's Head, Amlwch =

Public house in Amlwch, Wales

Coordinates: 53.4088°N 4.3447°W

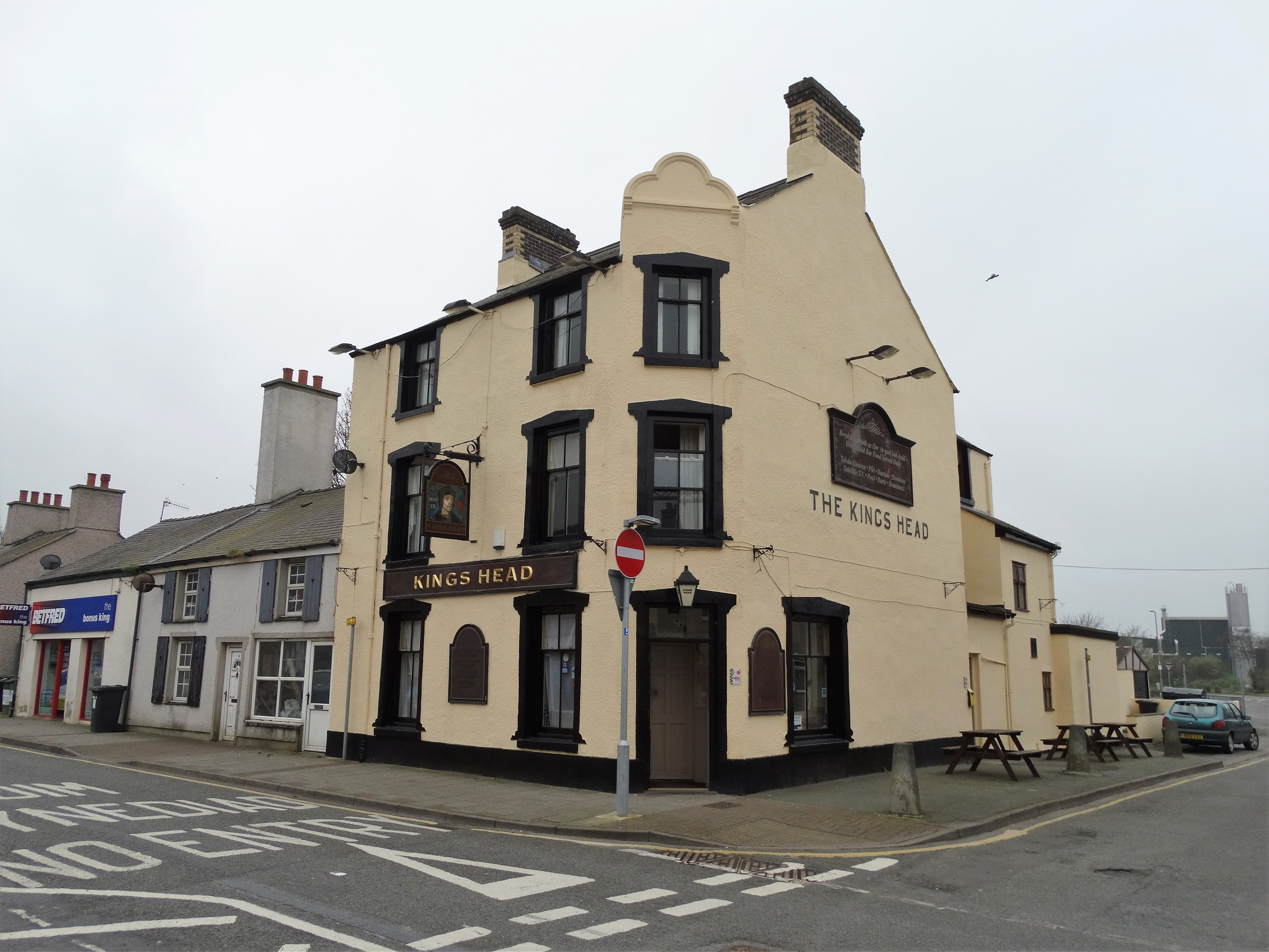
The King's Head, Amlwch

The King's Head, Amlwch is a public house situated in Salem Street, one of the main streets in Amlwch, Anglesey, Wales.

The pub name is one of many King's Heads found all over the United Kingdom. It is named after Henry VII of England, who was born in Wales (Pembroke Castle) in 1457.

"The Kings", as it is popularly known, is the only original pub left standing from the town's copper industry at Parys Mountain in the eighteenth century. This is at a time when it was recorded that there was a pub ratio of one pub for every four people in the town when the population was near 10,000 at the time.
