= The Centre, Bristol =

Open space in Bristol, England

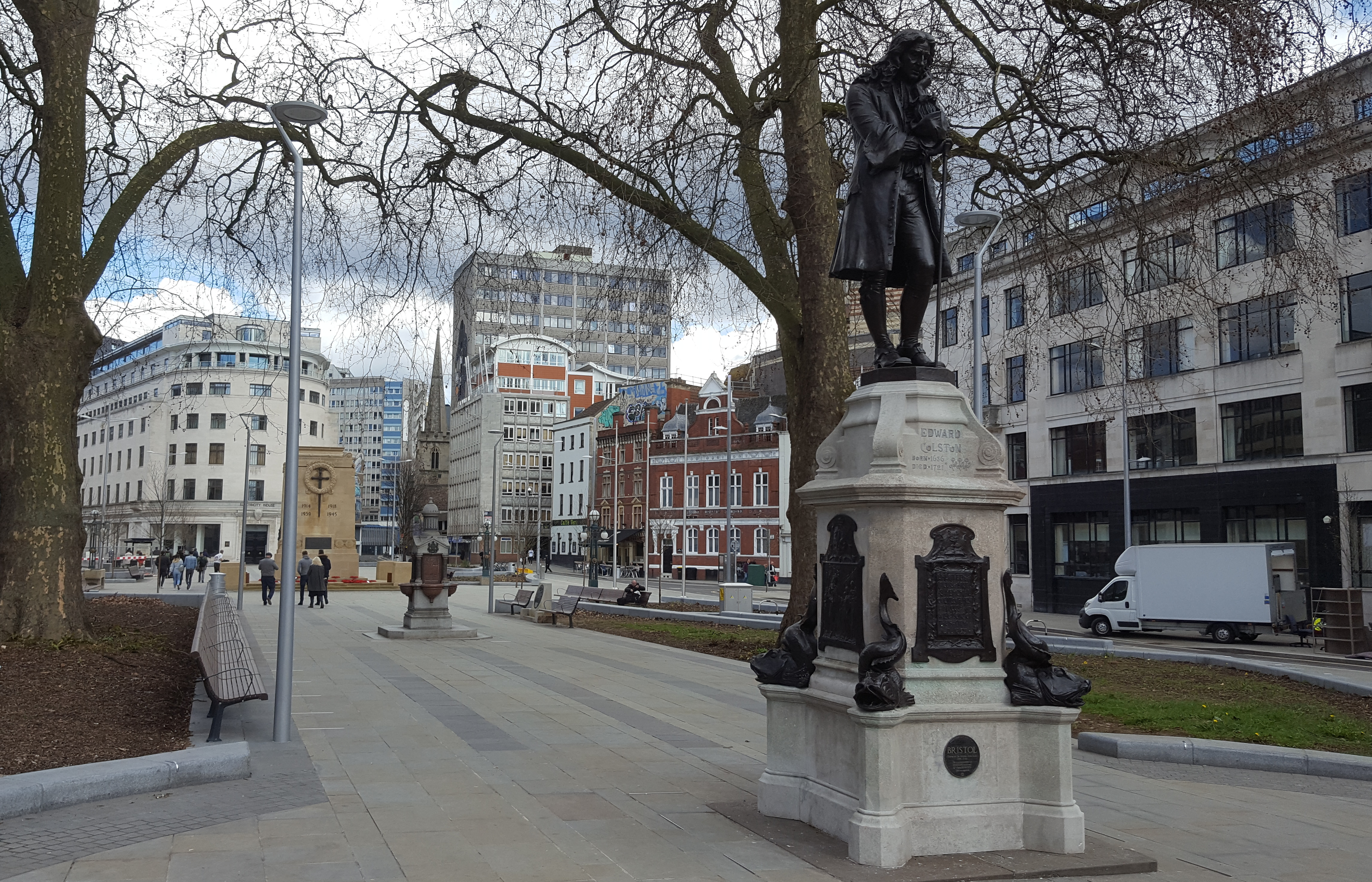
- View of northern end of The Centre, March 2018, before removal of Colston statue

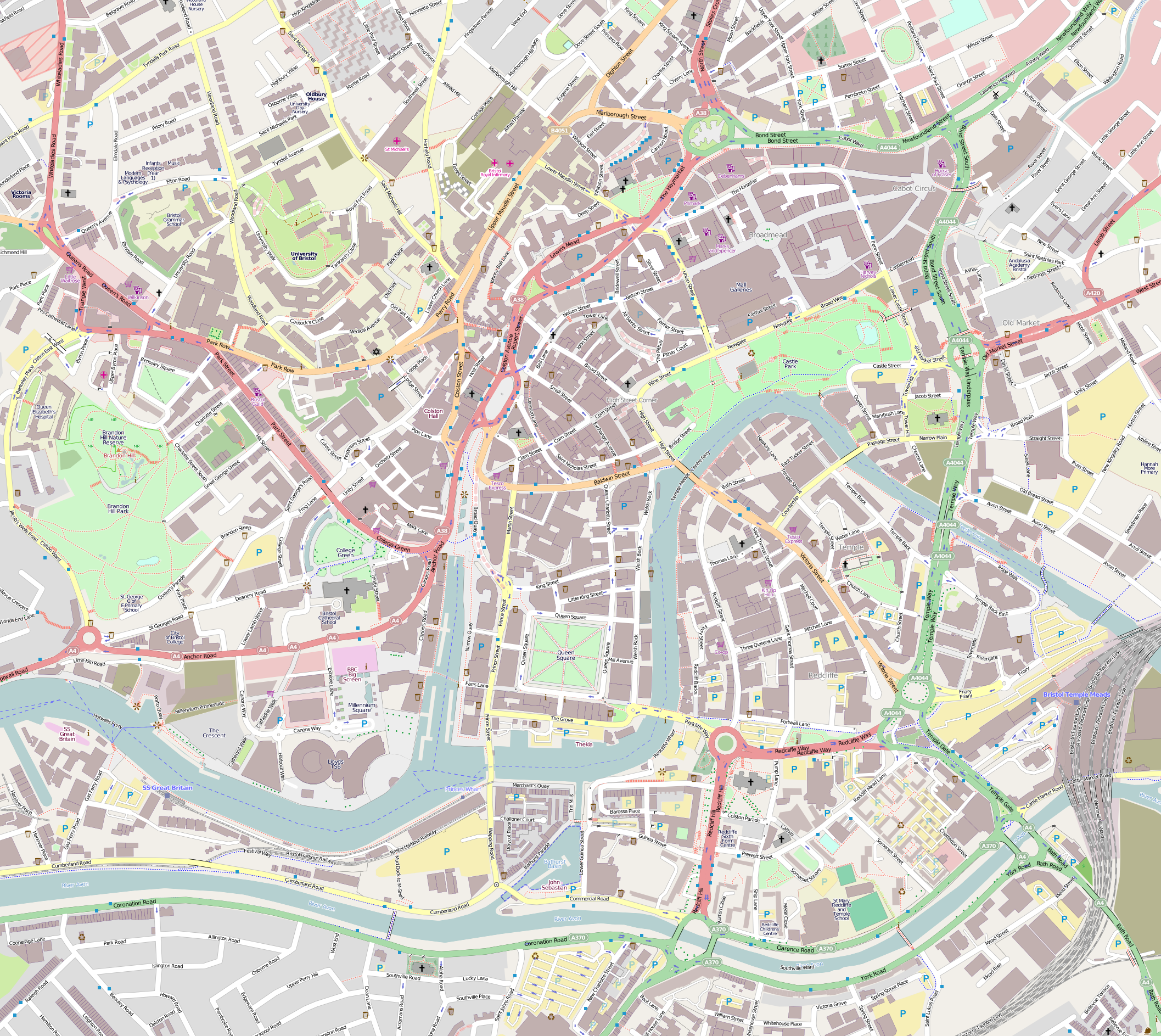
- Location within Bristol Central
- Former name: Tramways Centre
- Maintained by: Bristol City Council
- Location: Bristol, England
- Postal code: BS1
- Coordinates: 51.4540°N 2.5972°W
- North: Lewins Mead, Rupert Street
- East: Baldwin Street
- South: Anchor Road
- West: College Green

The Centre is a public open space in the central area of Bristol, England, created by covering over the River Frome. The northern end of The Centre, known as Magpie Park, is skirted on its western edge by Colston Avenue, while the southern end is a larger paved area bounded by St Augustine's Parade to the west, Broad Quay the east, and St Augustine's Reach (part of the Floating Harbour) to the south, and bisected by the 2016 extension of Baldwin Street. The Centre is managed by Bristol City Council.

The name 'The Centre' (or 'The City Centre') appears to have been applied to the area from the mid-twentieth century; before that, from 1893 when the upper part of St Augustine's reach was covered, it was known as the Tramways Centre and Magpie Park.

The Centre is not the historic or civic centre of Bristol, nor is it a major shopping area. It is, however, an important local transport interchange and cultural destination. Many local bus services terminate at or pass through here, it is served by ferry services to Hotwells and Bristol Temple Meads station, and there are busy taxi ranks.

The Centre has been altered on a number of occasions, originally to ease traffic flow but latterly to try to strike a balance between its use as both public open space and an important traffic corridor. In 2017, alterations to accommodate the MetroBus bus rapid transit scheme were completed.

== History ==
=== Before the culvert ===
The Centre owes its form to the channel dug in the 1240s to provide additional quays and wharves for the burgeoning Bristol Docks.

This channel, St Augustine's Reach, became the heart of Bristol Docks. As trade flourished and ships became larger the docks expanded, but the completion of the Floating Harbour in 1809, and the building of docks at Avonmouth and Portishead, made the wharves at the northern end of St Augustine's Reach increasingly marginal.

The northern end of St Augustine's Reach was narrower and accessed by opening The Drawbridge, which crossed the docks at the end of Clare Street (where present-day Baldwin Street was built in 1881). The Drawbridge was rebuilt for the fourth and final time in 1868, but by 1893 when it was replaced by a fixed structure it had been a source of "great congestion" to traffic (including the new trams) for many years, often being kept open for twenty minutes while ships were roped up.

=== Magpie Park ===
In 1892, The Drawbridge was replaced by the elegant stone St Augustine's Bridge; at the same time the docks to the north were infilled. The new area, which was called Magpie Park, was enclosed by Colston Avenue. It was named after the newspaper The Bristol Magpie, whose offices were on the western side of Colston Avenue. The Bristol Industrial and Fine Arts Exhibition was held here in 1893; this popular attraction saw 500,000 attendees and raised £2,200 for charity.

This is now the site of the Bristol Cenotaph, unveiled in 1932. The Cenotaph continues to be the focus of local remembrance.

=== Tramways Centre ===
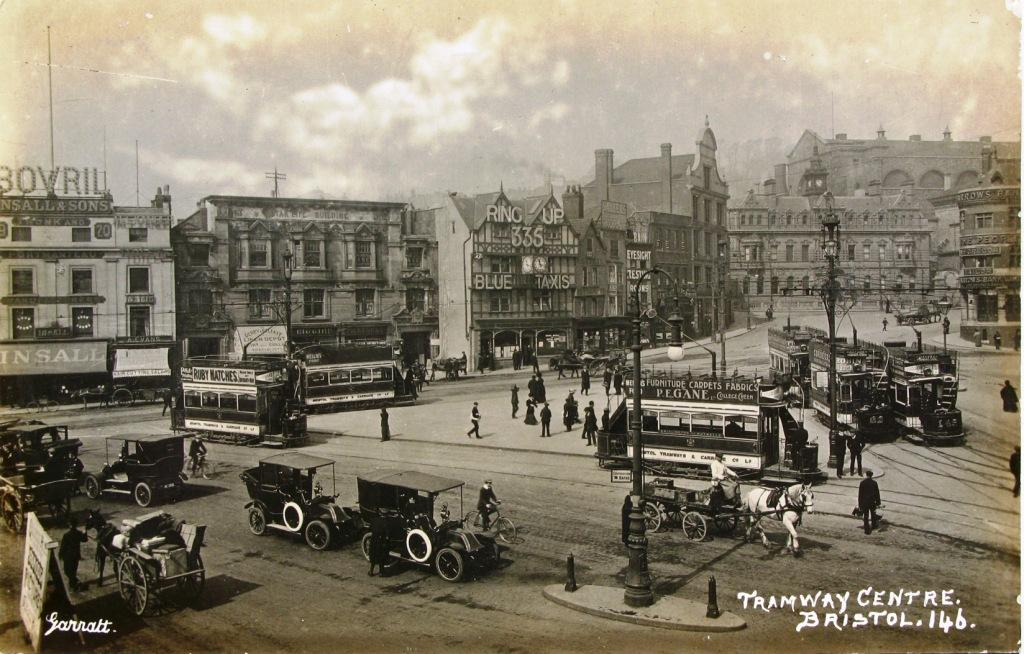
The Tramways Centre in the early 1900s

During the 1890s, Bristol's tramway system was expanded and electrified. In 1896 the Bristol Tramways and Carriage Company (BT&CC) moved their head office to premises at 1–3 St Augustine's Parade, where they remained until 1970. The need for a central interchange was recognised, and to this end a large triangular traffic island – later nicknamed 'Skivvy's Island' because of its use by domestic servants – was built between the BT&CC offices and St Augustine's Bridge. The Tramways Centre became the most important of the BT&CC's three central termini, serving more routes than the others at Bristol Bridge and Old Market. It was the terminus for trams from the north and east of the city, and trams from Hotwells to Temple Meads station and Brislington also stopped here. Passengers could straightforwardly alight from one tram and board another to continue their journey without the need to cross roads. A large three-faced ornamental clock was fixed high on the Tramways offices, and 'under the clock on The Centre' became a popular meeting place.

J. B. Priestley visited Bristol in 1933, and described The Centre as 'a place where trams and coastal steamers seemed in danger of collision'.

Buses first started to use the Tramways Centre in 1910, initially only on the route to Clifton. By 1913, ten bus routes started from The Centre. In 1938 and 1939 the tram routes serving the Tramways Centre were replaced by buses, so that trams ceased to use the island. Trams elsewhere in the city ceased completely in 1941.

=== Inner Circuit Road ===
In 1938, construction started on a culvert covering the area between St Augustine's Bridge and the southern end of Broad Quay. This created a route for the Inner Circuit Road, which had already bisected Queen Square, to continue northwards. Construction continued despite the outbreak of war. A large elongated roundabout was formed, with the central space initially being used as a car park. The Tramways Centre island remained, devoid of trams.

After the war, the central space was planted with lawns, ornamental borders and golden Irish yews and became known as the Centre Gardens.

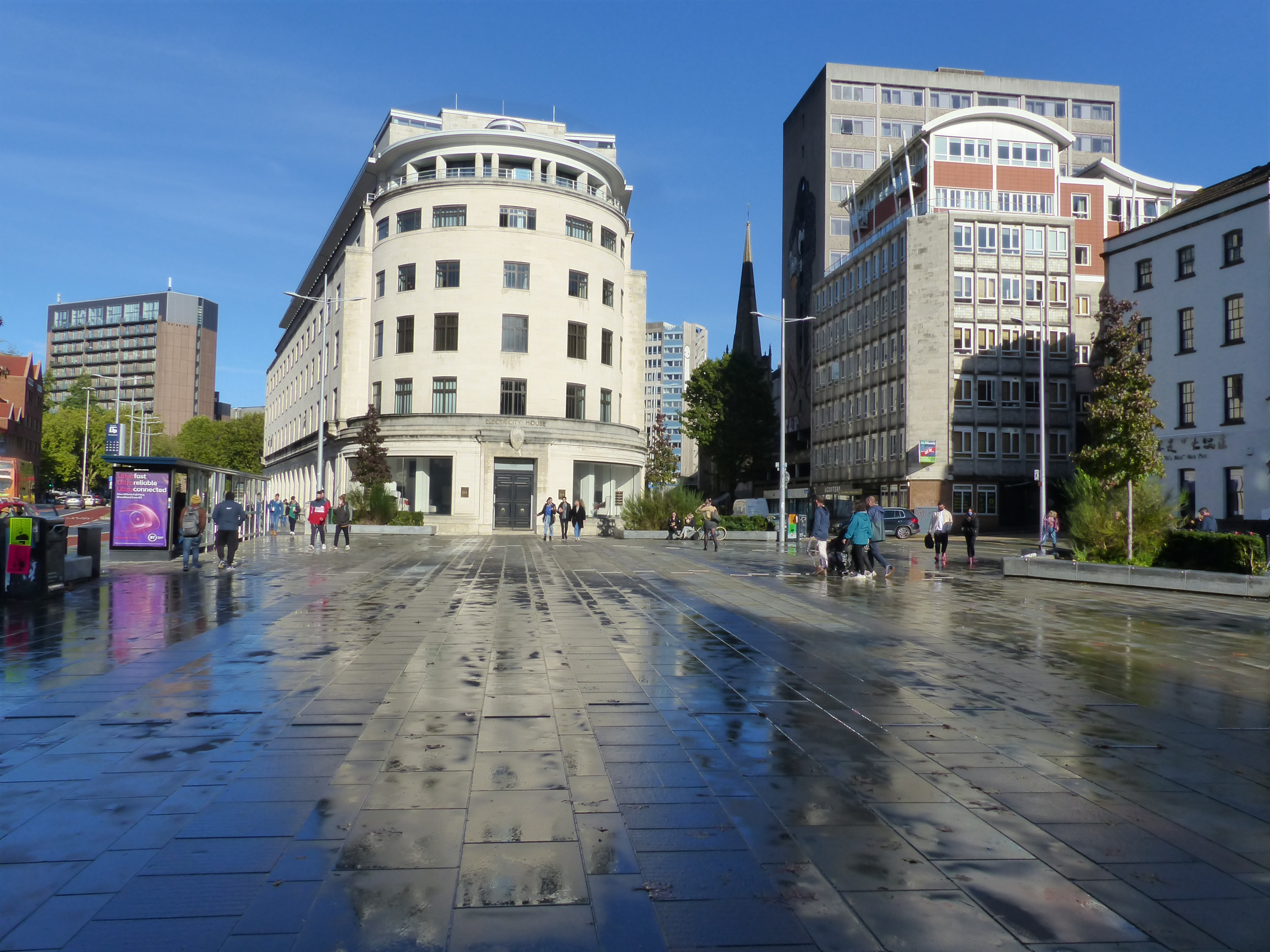
Electricity House in 2021

In 1948, the Art Deco building West Gate, later known as Electricity House, was completed at the northern end of The Centre as the headquarters of the South Western Electricity Board.

=== 1957 remodelling ===
The Inner Circuit Road was extended northwards into Colston Avenue in 1957–58. The Tramways Centre island was removed and the Centre Gardens island was extended to a point near the end of St Stephen's Street. Magpie Park was reduced in length, Colston Avenue was widened and many of the (by then) mature plane trees were felled.

=== 1998 remodelling ===
It had been recognised since the 1960s that the southern half of the Inner Circuit Road had badly impacted the amenity of Queen Square and The Centre, and by the 1990s tentative steps were being taken towards downgrading this part of the road and transferring traffic along less sensitive routes. By the mid-1990s, the road across Queen Square had been closed and plans were being developed to re-balance The Centre in favour of pedestrians and public transport.

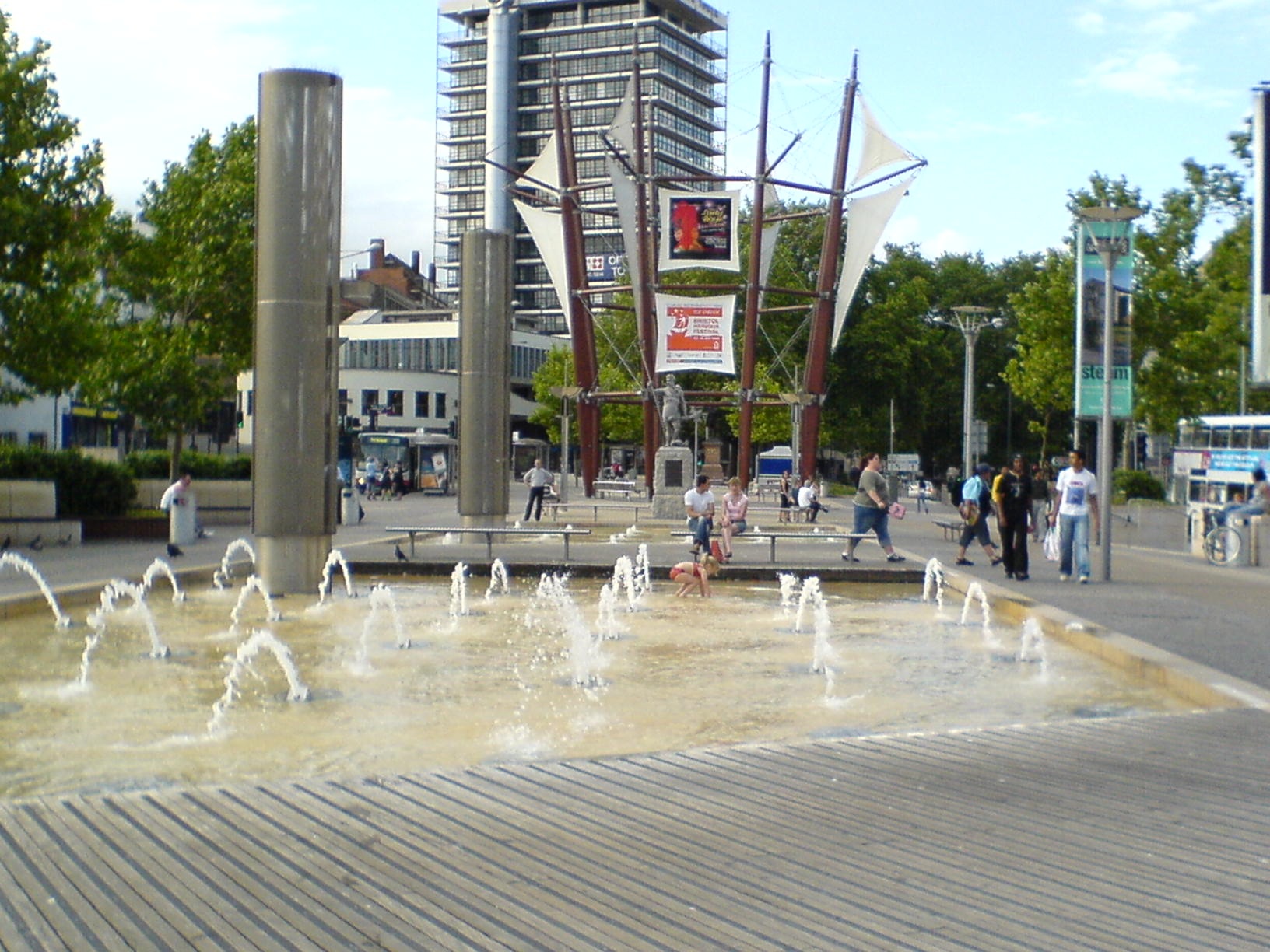
The water fountains, paddling area and sail structure in 2006, all since removed

Bristol City Council began a consultation exercise in 1996, in which the public were asked to choose between a 'Dock Option' (reopening the old harbour as far as St Augustine's Bridge) and a cheaper 'Promenade Option'. Both options involved closing the road across Quay Head; the Promenade Option used the new space to create a larger pedestrianised area in place of the Centre Gardens, with fountains, a cascade leading down to the waterside, and a sail structure to evoke Bristol's maritime past. The remaining road space in both options would be designed to give greater priority to public transport.

The Council decided to build the 'Promenade Option'. This soon came under criticism for its poor safety, particularly after a number of pedestrians were injured by vehicles and at least two people struck by buses and killed. The new design was also criticised for its traffic noise and fumes, "dribbling" fountains, poor traffic flow, poor cycling infrastructure, and delays to public transport. Few were happy with the new design, and many were disappointed that the 'Dock Option' had not been pursued.

The area around the pedestrian crossing at the Baldwin Street end of Broad Quay was altered in 2003 after the Bristol Coroner called for improvements following an inquest on the death of a pedestrian hit by a bus.

Despite remedial work in 2007, the sail structure was found to be unsafe and removed in 2009.

In 2011, plans were again being developed for major changes to The Centre. These plans include the possibility of prohibiting private vehicles from crossing The Centre on the east–west axis, as mooted in the 1996 consultation.

=== 2015 remodelling for MetroBus ===
Between 2015 and 2018, the layout of The Centre was changed once more, this time to accommodate the MetroBus bus rapid transit scheme.

Private motor traffic was routed along the western edge of The Centre, and the gyratory traffic system was replaced by extended and more accessible pedestrian spaces. The new layout reduced the number of routes available to general traffic, some of which was diverted away from the area, whilst improving segregation for cycles and buses. The taxi ranks were relocated, and new bus stops were constructed for MetroBus services. Early indications suggested that journey times had been improved by these changes.

=== 2025 changes ===
The fountains installed in 2000 were removed in 2025, together with their underground mechanisms which were described by the city council as beyond repair. This enlarged the flat area at the southern end, for use by pedestrians, events and food stalls. At the same time, the paved cycleway was replaced by black tarmac to reduce conflict between pedestrians and cyclists.

== Sites of interest ==
As well as the Bristol Cenotaph, Magpie Park has a bronze statue of Edmund Burke by James Havard Thomas (1894) and had a statue Edward Colston (1895, by John Cassidy). On 7 June 2020, the statue of Colston was pulled down during a Black Lives Matter demonstration, following the murder of George Floyd in the United States. The 1893 Exhibition fountain commemorates the Industrial and Fine Art Exhibition.

St Mary on the Quay stands on Colston Avenue to the west of the park, and St Stephen's Church stands nearby to the east.

The southern end of The Centre (the Centre Promenade) has a 1723 lead statue of Neptune, moved to The Centre from Temple Street in 1949 and now Grade II* listed. A stepped water feature leads down to a ferry landing stage at the current head of St Augustine's Reach.

Bristol Hippodrome stands to the west of the Centre Promenade on St Augustine's Parade. Further north are the high-rise Beacon Tower and just west of this on Colston Street, Bristol's concert hall Bristol Beacon (both renamed in 2020, formerly bearing Colston's name).

On Broad Quay, the former head office tower of Bristol and West Building Society was repurposed in 2011 into a hotel and serviced flats.

The Centre is part of the College Green conservation area.

== Gallery ==
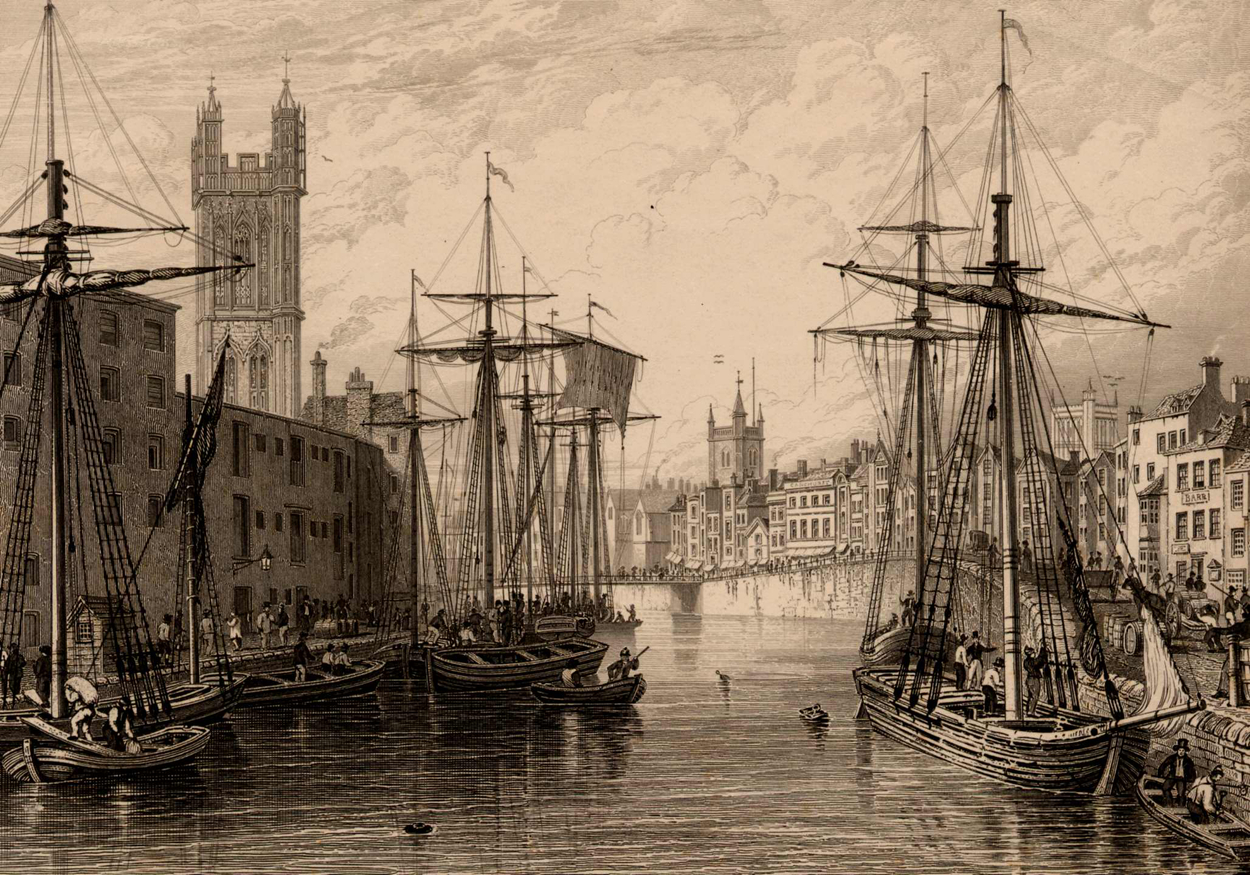
St Augustine's Reach, pre-1850, looking south across what is now Magpie Park

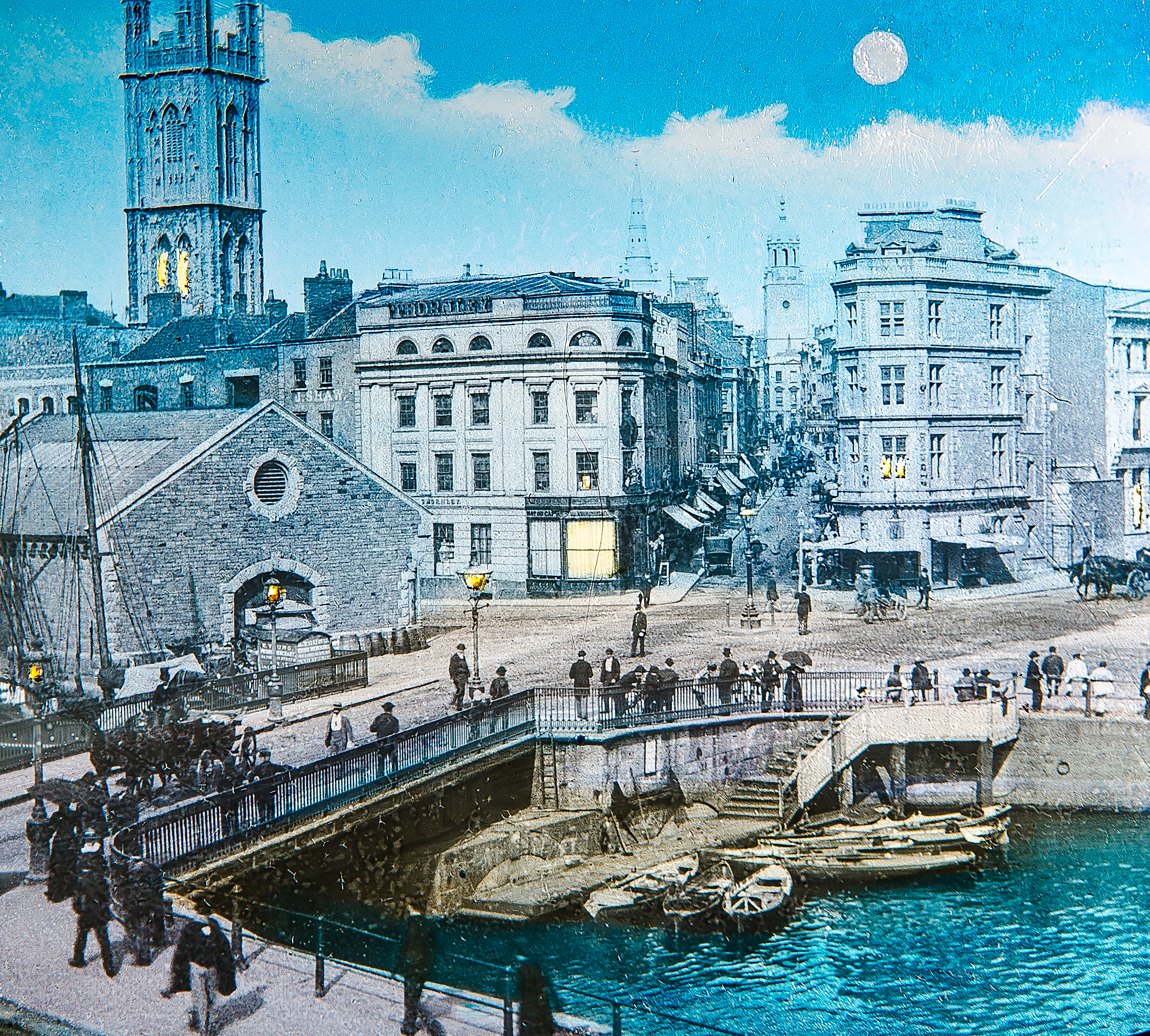
The Drawbridge, looking towards Clare Street and Baldwin Street

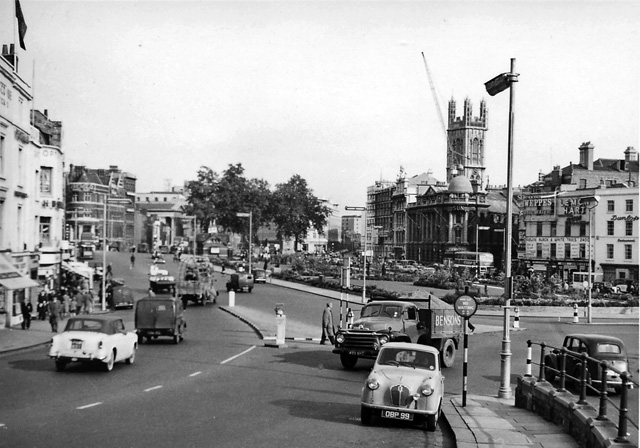
The Centre, 1958

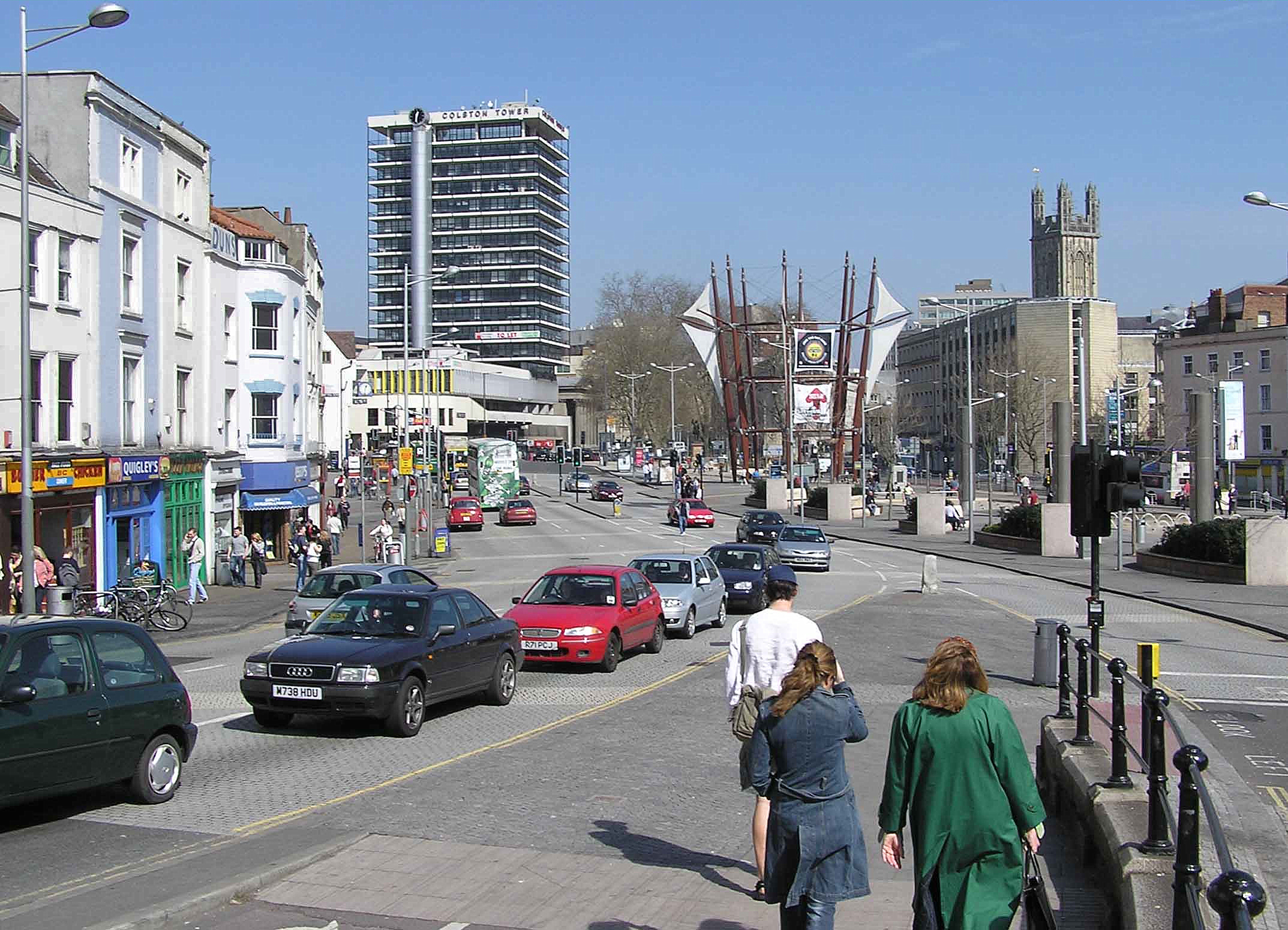
Similar view of The Centre, 2005

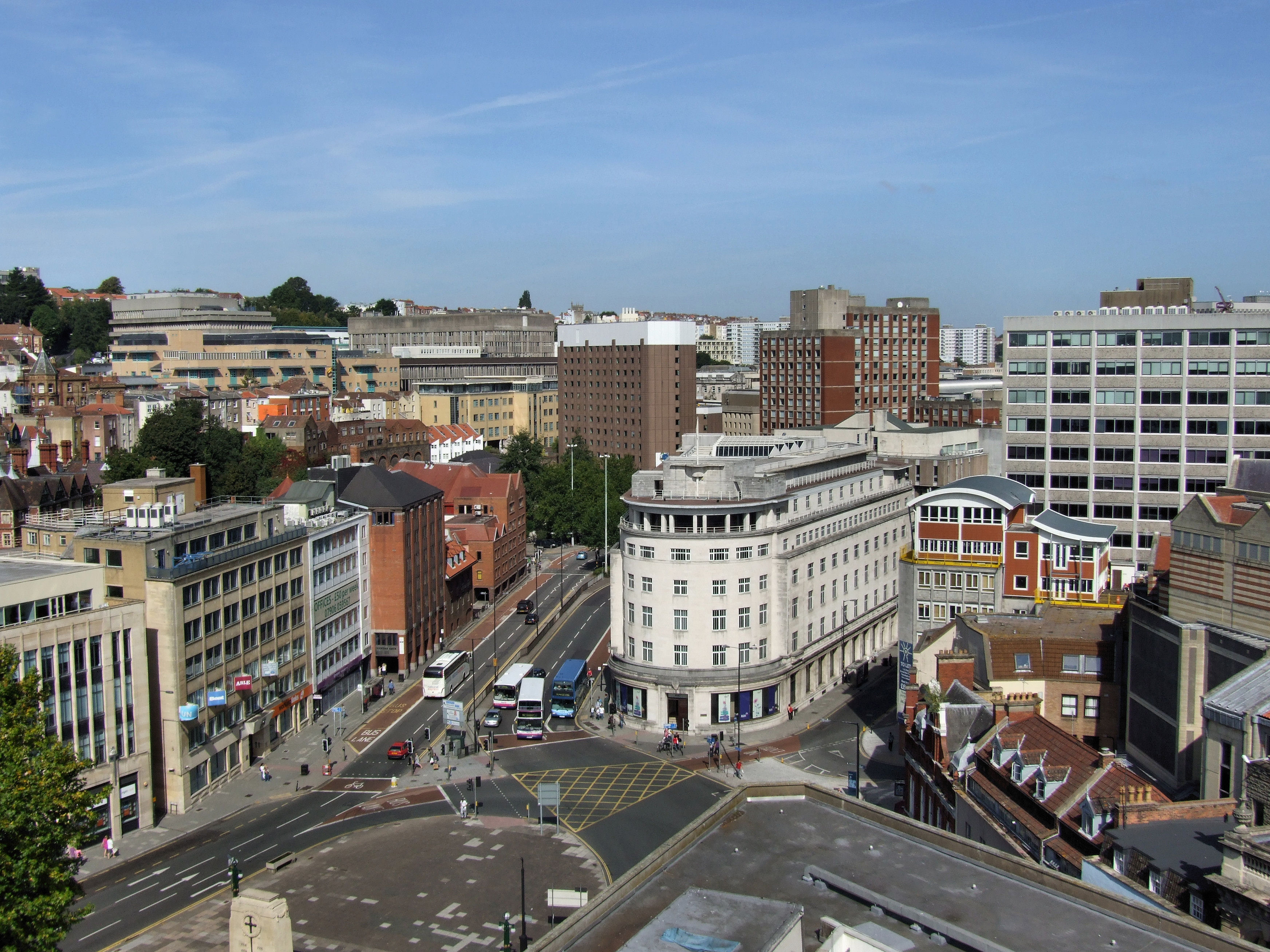
Magpie Park, before 2015 remodelling

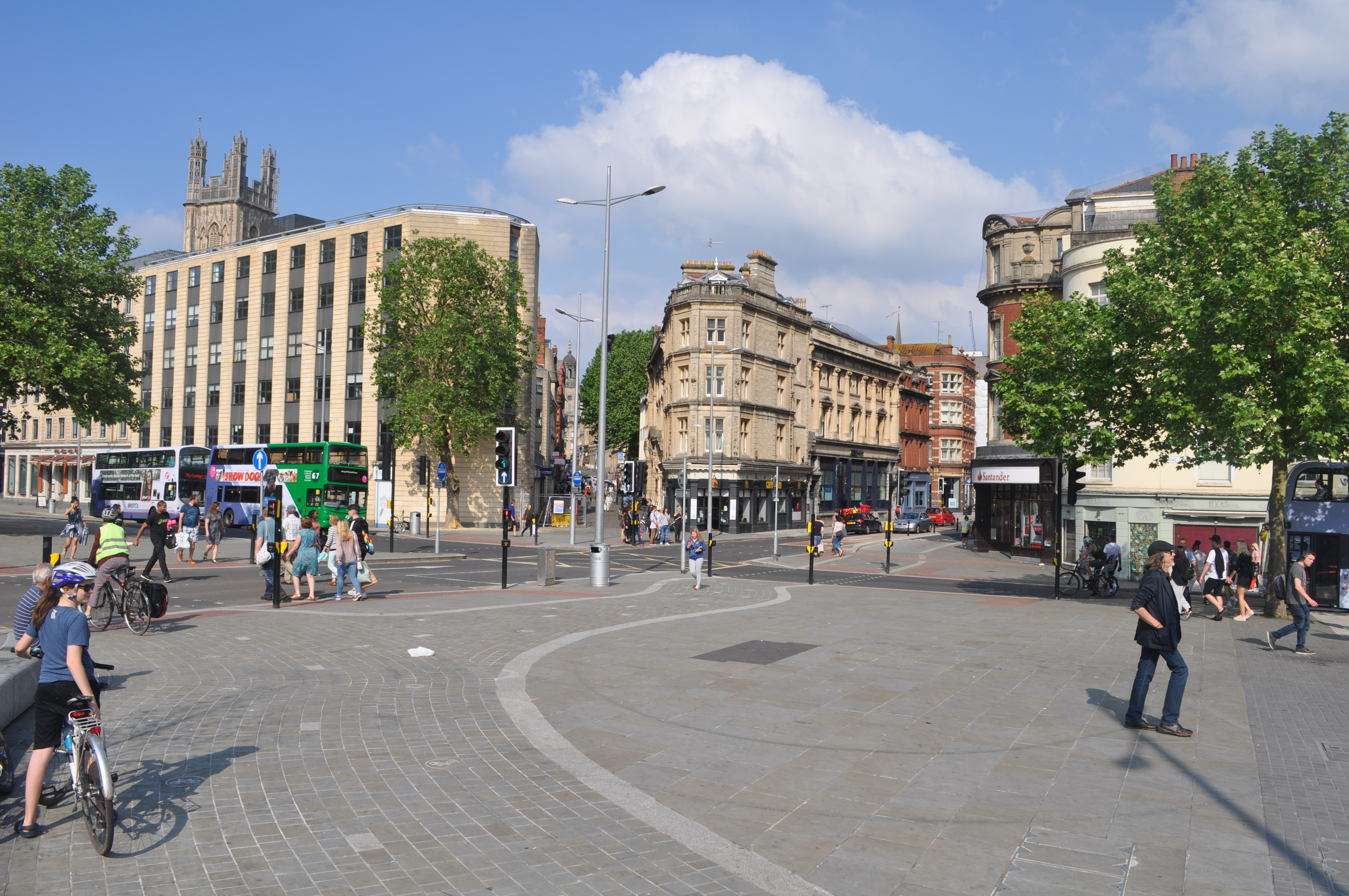
Looking across newly extended Baldwin Street into Clare Street, 2018

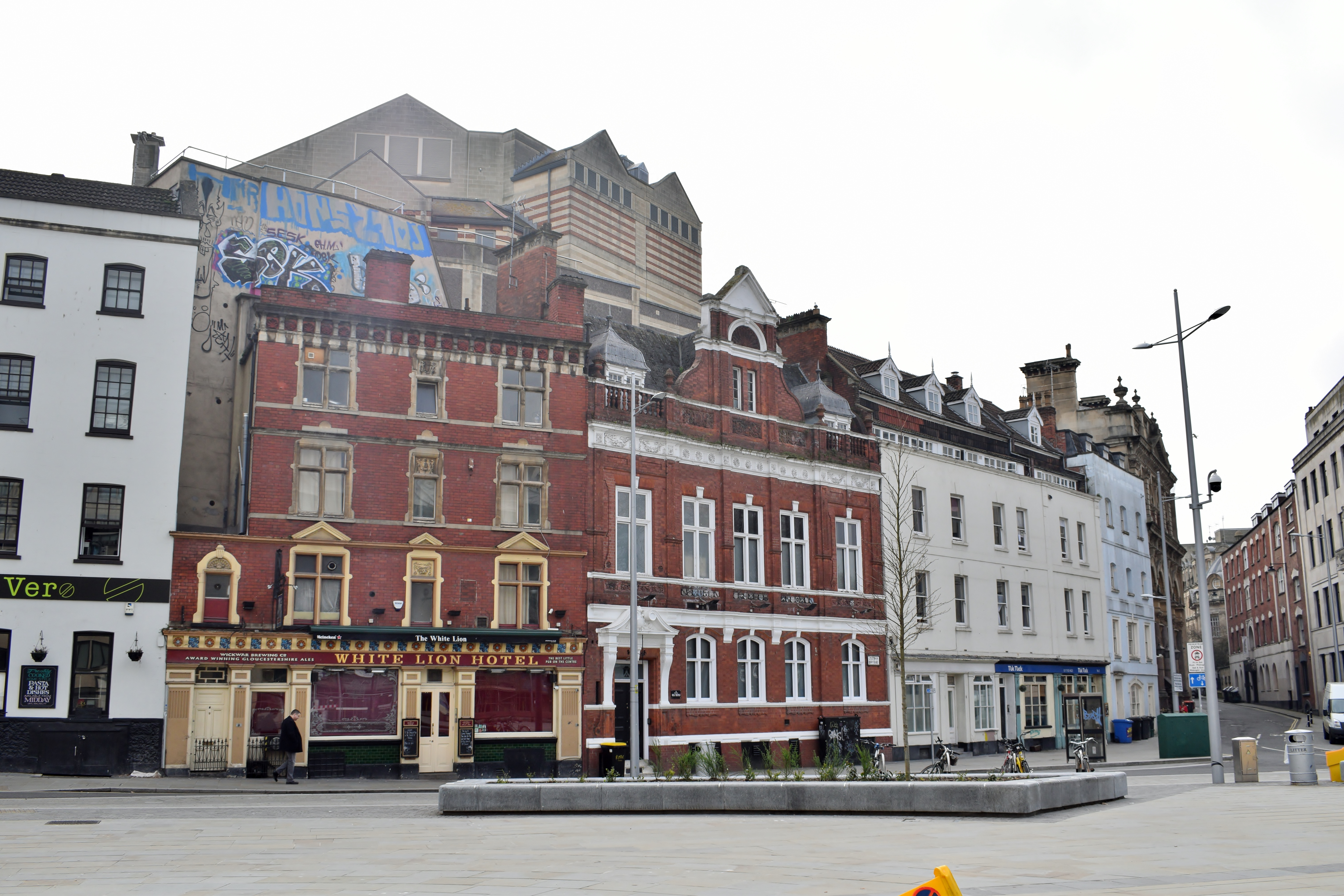
Magpie Park and St Stephen's St, 2018

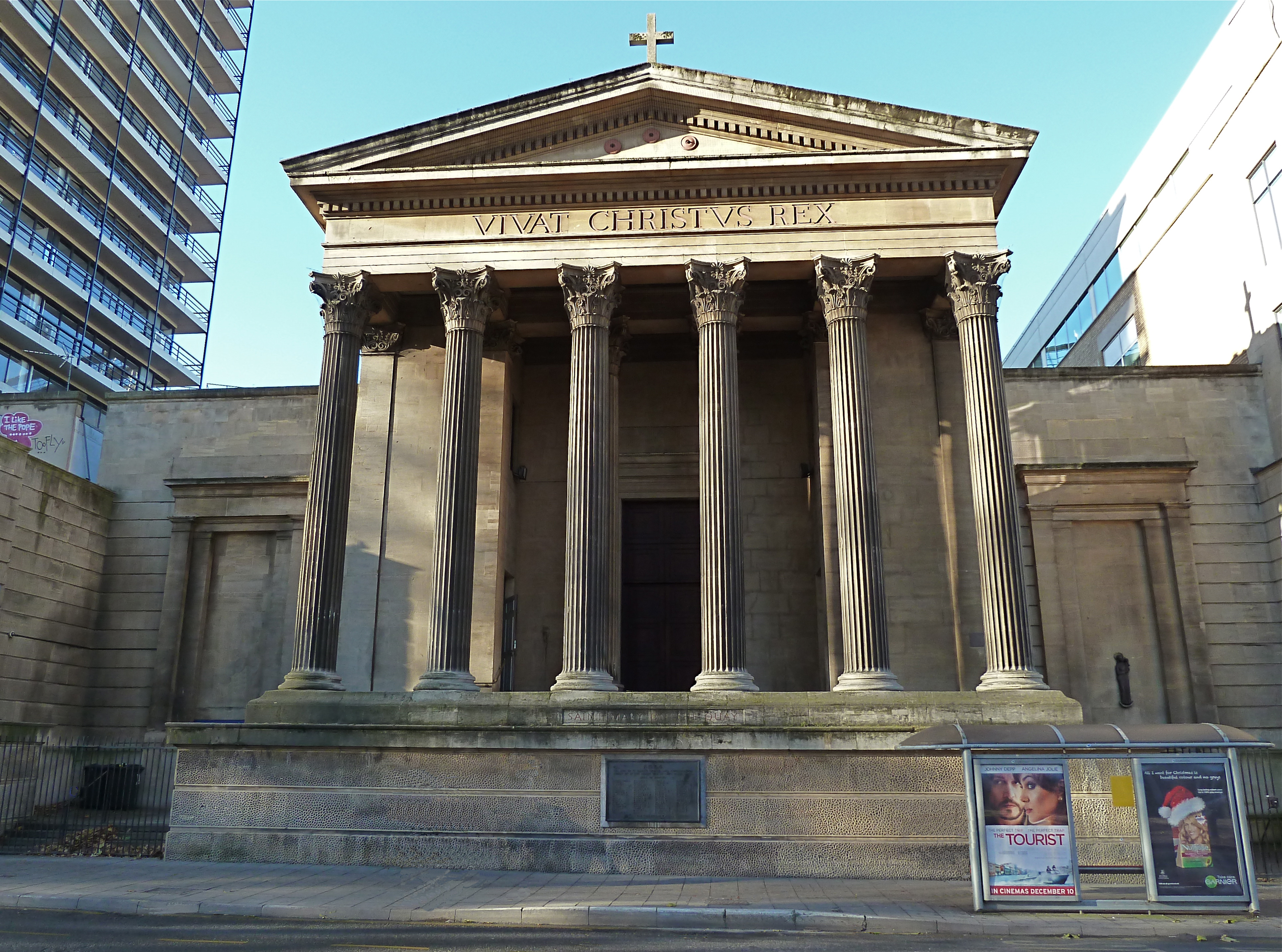
St Mary on the Quay Church
