= Park Street, Bristol =

Street in Bristol, England

Coordinates: 51°27′16″N 2°36′11″W

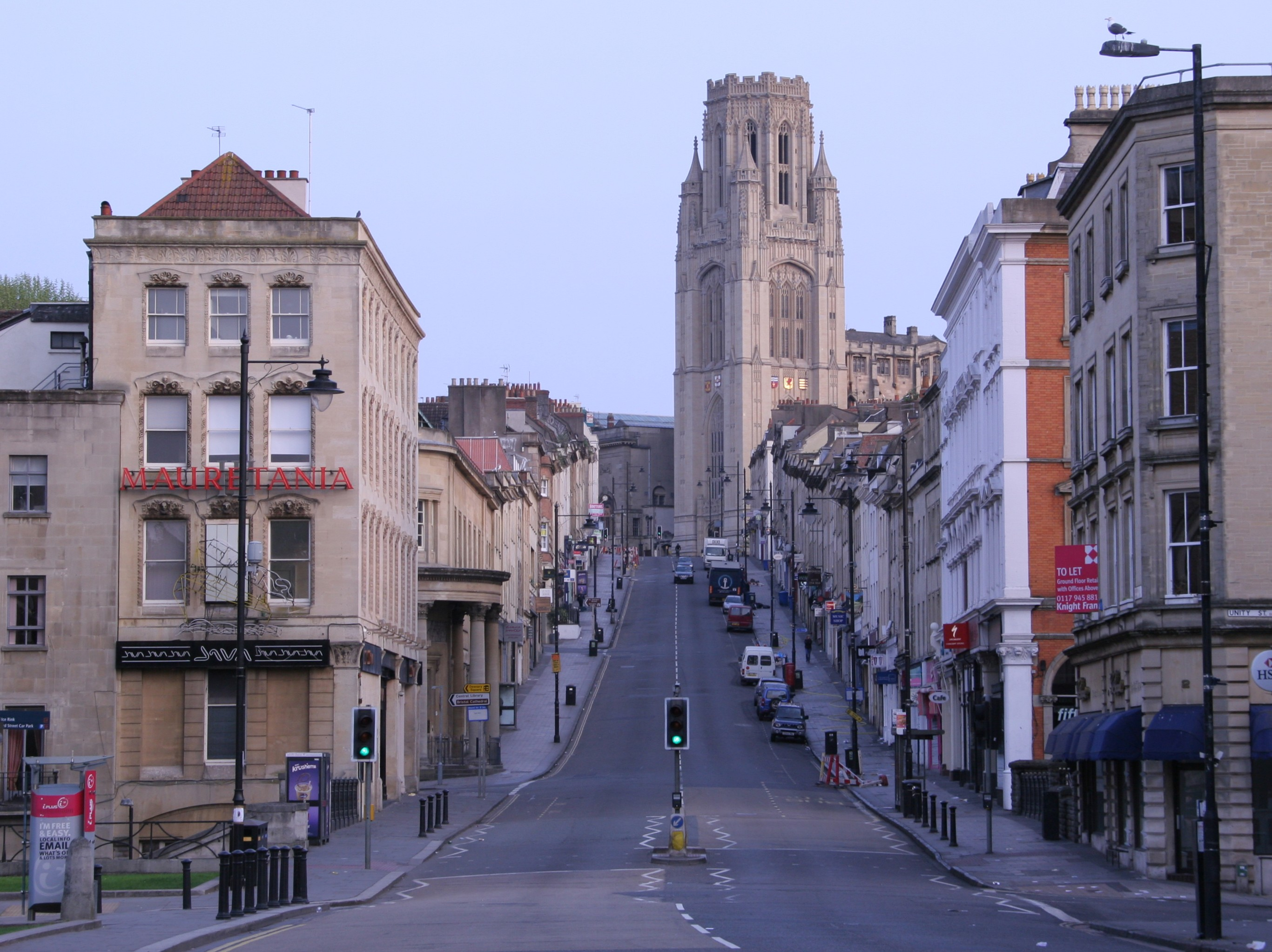
- Park Street, with a view of the Wills Memorial Building at the top and "The Mauretania" pub on the left.

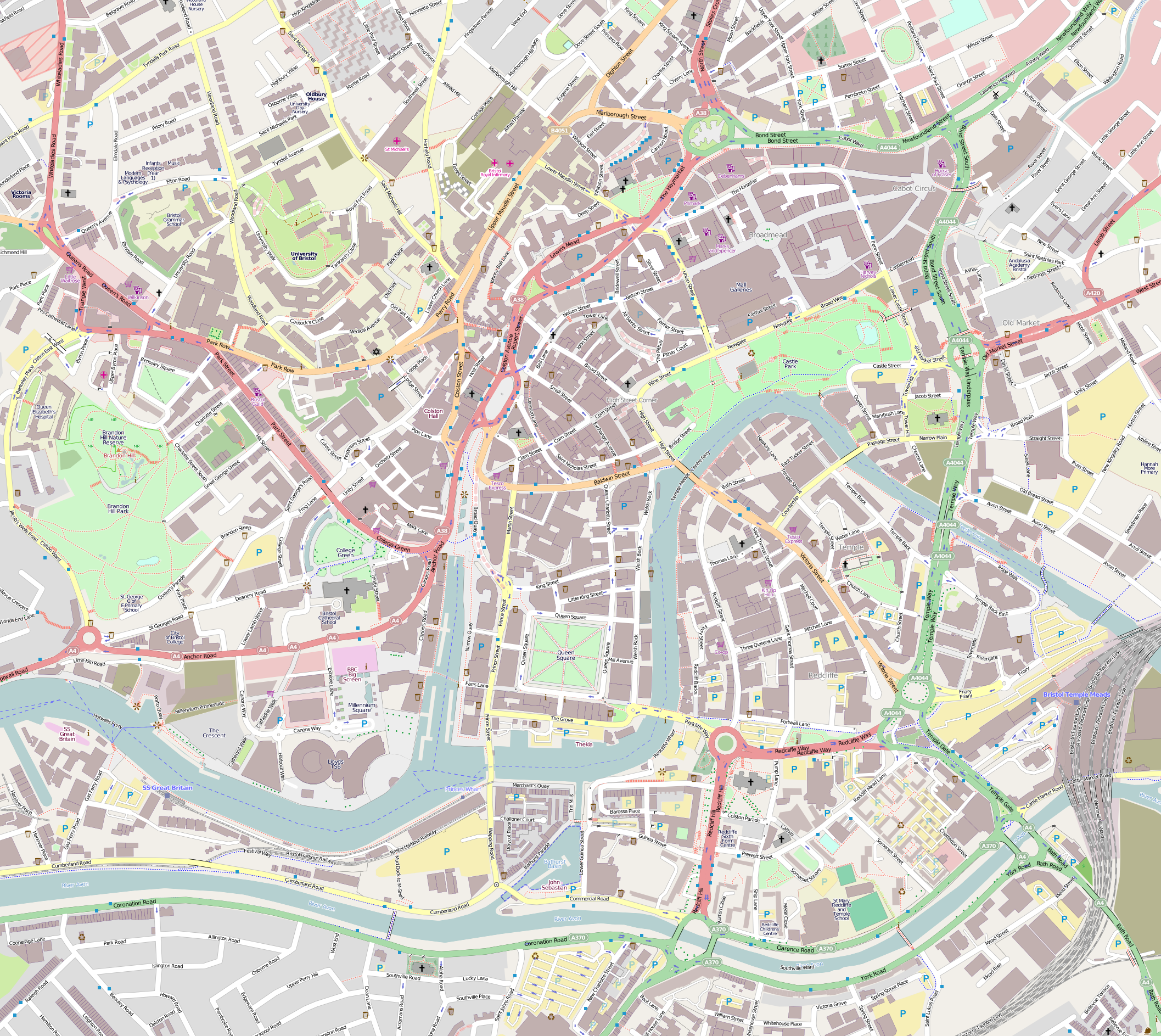
- Location within Bristol Central
- Maintained by: Bristol City Council
- Location: Bristol, England
- Postal code: BS1
- North: Park Row
- South: College Green

Park Street is a major shopping street in Bristol, England, linking the city centre to Clifton. It forms part of the A4018.

The building of Park Street started in 1761 and it was Bristol's earliest example of uniformly stepped hillside terracing. The street runs from College Green up a steep incline northwards to join Park Row near the eastern corner of the Clifton Triangle. Looking up the street there is a dramatic view of the Wills Memorial Building.

Along with nearby Brandon Hill and some neighbouring streets it forms the Park Street and Brandon Hill Conservation Area.

== History ==
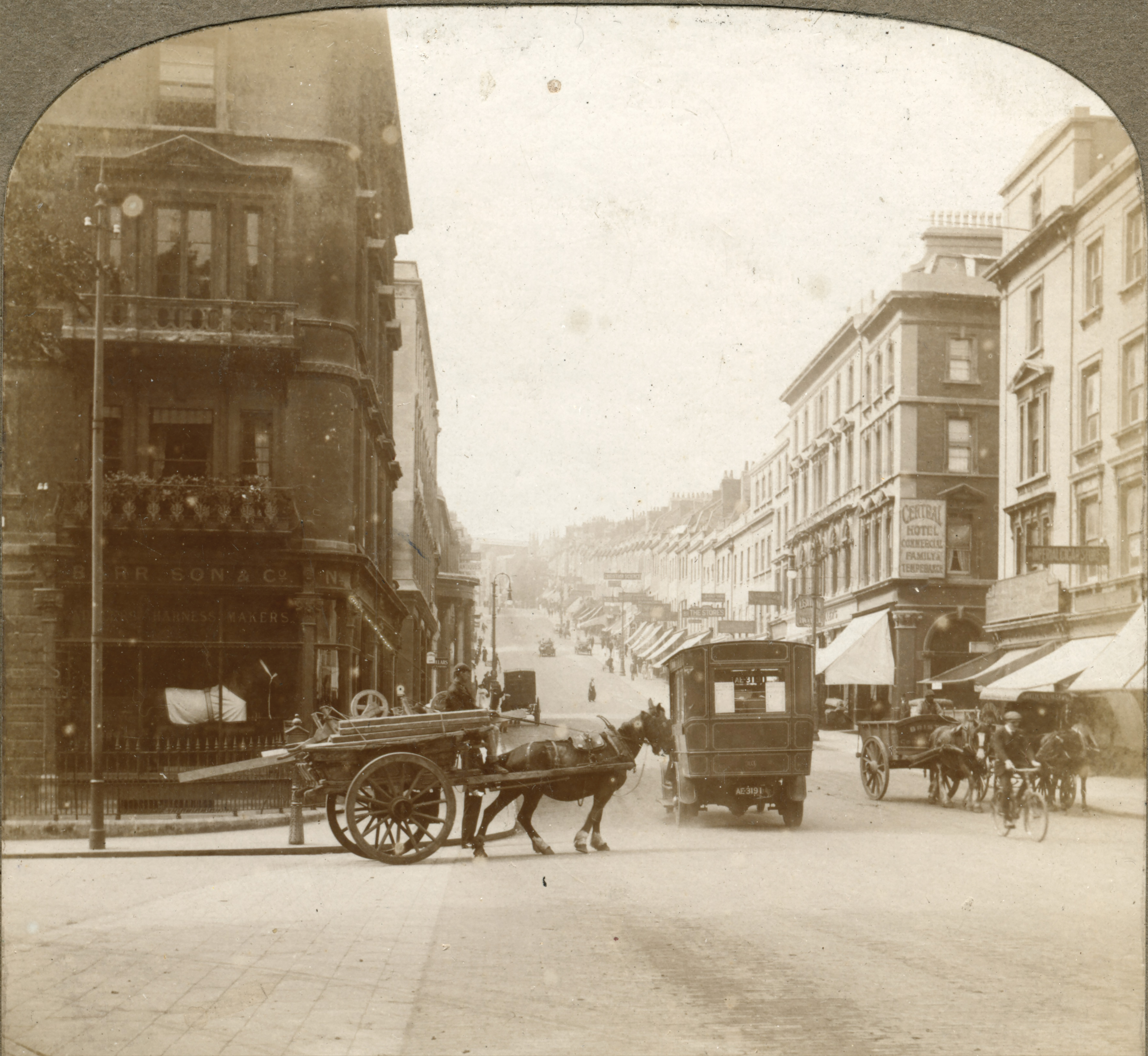
Park Street viewed from College Green in the early 20th century

The development of Park Street began in 1740 when the City Council leased land to Nathaniel Day, holder of Bullock's Park, to open a new street.

Around that time, some houses were built on the north-east side of College Green, probably by James Paty the Elder. Around 1742 he was probably also involved in the development of adjacent Unity Street, where the use of stone facing and the rustication of the ground floor facades set a precedent for most of the later development in the Park Street area.

In 1758 a design by George Tyndall was approved for Park Street to connect to Whiteladies Gate, one of the turnpikes. George Tully drew up plans and building started in 1761. The first phase of building finished at Great George Street around 1762. The upper part of the street was developed from about 1786 and work was suspended in the financial crisis of 1793, resumed and completed about ten years later.

Much of the building throughout this period was by the firms owned by members of the Paty family, initially that of Thomas Paty, probably jointly with that of his brother James Paty the Younger. Thomas Paty's sons William and John joined his firm as partners in 1777. Developments by the Patys spread around Park Street to Great George Street, College Street, Denmark Street and Lodge Street and eventually from 1787 Charlotte Street, Berkeley Square, Berkeley Crescent and Upper Berkeley Place.

A standard design by Thomas Paty was used for Park Street's houses. These had plain facades three windows wide, and as in the earlier Unity Street development they were faced in Bath Stone with a rusticated ground floor. The general conversion from housing to commercial premises since then, however, has meant the loss of the original ground floors; only No.51 retains its pediment, rustication and railings. The grander houses built c. 1762 by Thomas Paty on either side of the junction with Great George Street, in brick with stone dressings and with pediments on their George Street facades, were an exception to the generally plain style. Park Street was Bristol's earliest example of uniformly stepped terracing. Stepping would become a common approach to hillside building in Clifton, for squares as well as terraces, a different approach to that taken in the nearby city of Bath.

The Philosophical Institution, now Freemasons' Hall, was built by R.S. Pope for C.R. Cockerell in 1821.

A plaque on no. 89 records it as having been the home in the 1850s of William Budd, "pioneer in the isolation of infectious diseases". The same building was occupied from 1884 by George's bookshop. The shop was bought by Blackwell's in 1929 but retained the George's name into the 1990s.

A cast-iron viaduct to take the street over the natural gully between College Green and Brandon Hill was built by R.S. Pope in 1871. It is a grade II listed building.

About a third of the buildings on Park Street suffered bombing on 24 November 1940 in the Bristol Blitz: 30 were destroyed, 6 burnt out and another 3 severely damaged. Nearly all were later rebuilt and restored. During World War II Park Street was designated for white troops from the United States Army. On the evening of 15 July 1944, black soldiers entered the area and fighting broke out between about 400 soldiers. 120 Military police broke up the fighting but one was stabbed. Several soldiers were shot and one died. The city was then placed under military curfew.

In 1974 an IRA bombing injured 20 people. In 1976 a huge gas explosion destroyed some of the buildings near the bottom of the road; most were rebuilt as replicas.

On 4 May 2014, Bristol-based artist Luke Jerram installed a 95-metre (312 ft) water slide on the street as an event called "Park and Slide". 360 people chosen by ballot from nearly 100,000 applicants were able to slide down the 6.5° (11.4%, about 1 in 9) slope.

== Park Street today ==
Park Street is now mainly retail and leisure premises. Among the more unusual businesses are the Bristol Folk House, an adult education centre and arts venue, and, until its closure in 2024, the Bristol Guild of Applied Art.

Some of the furnishings from the RMS Mauretania were installed in a bar and restaurant complex at the bottom of Park Street, initially called "The Mauretania", now "Java". The lounge bar was the library with mahogany panelling: above the first-class Grand Saloon with French-style gilding overlooks Frog Lane. The neon sign on the south wall still advertises "The Mauretania": installed in 1938 this was the first moving neon sign in Bristol. It is a grade II listed building.

Visible from the viaduct, on the side of a building in Frogmore Street, is a controversial mural, named Well Hung Lover, by local graffiti artist Banksy.

== Gallery ==
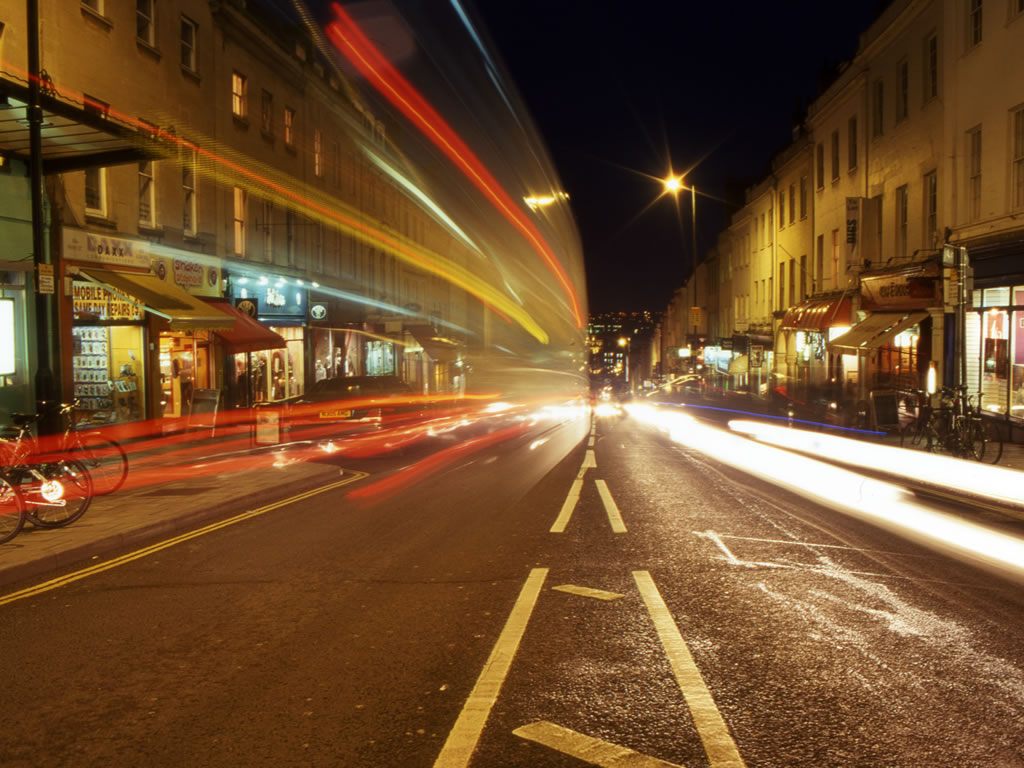
A view down Park Street at night.

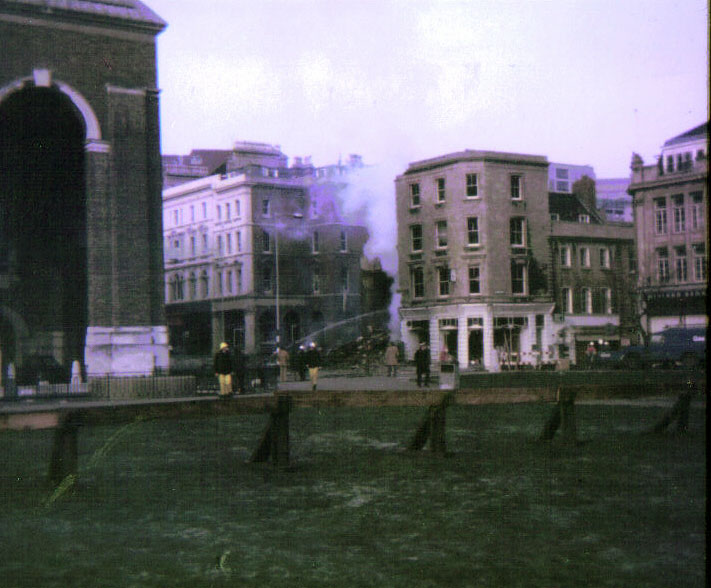
Park Street explosion aftermath, 1976.

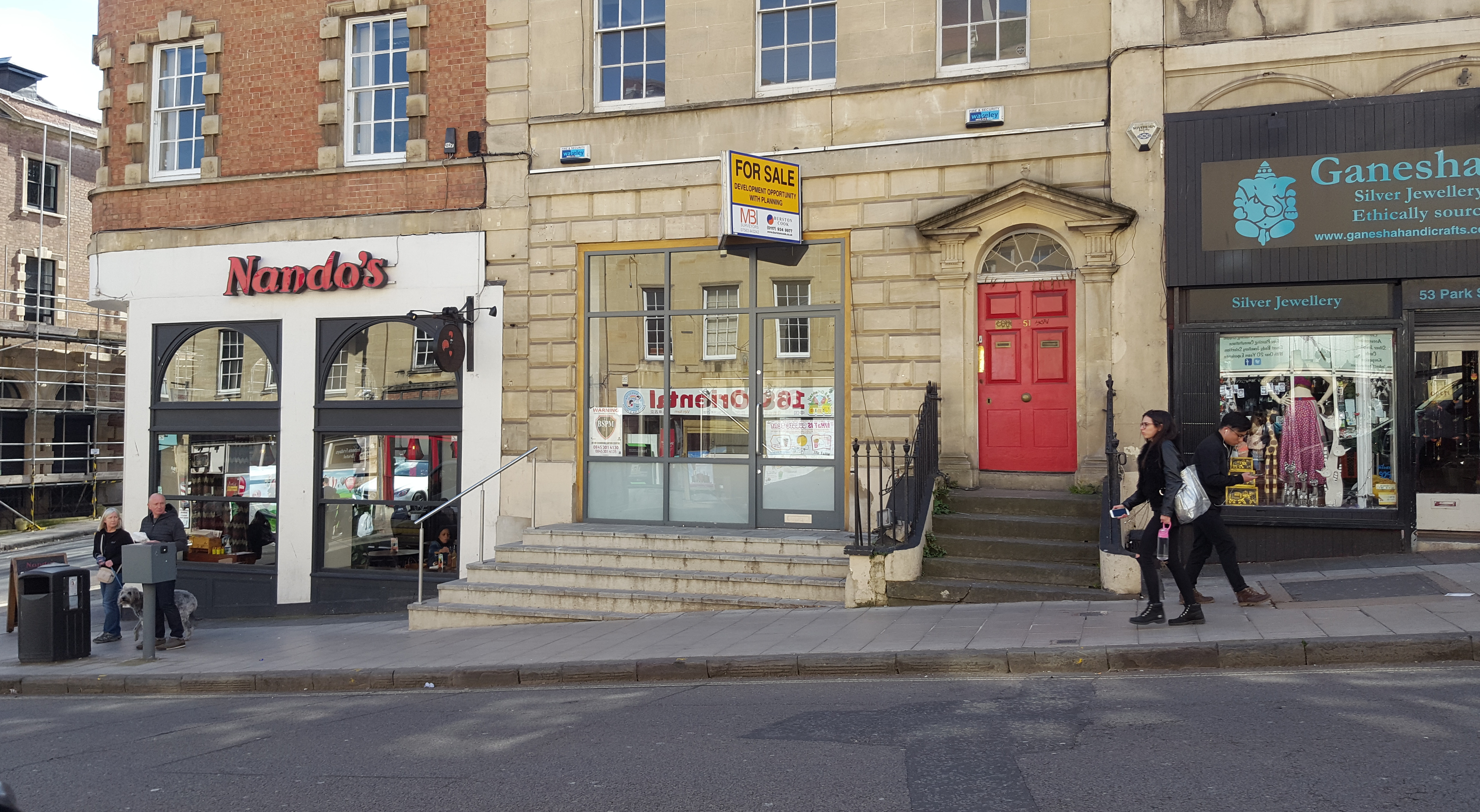
51 Park Street, showing rusticated lower storey, railings, steps and pedimented doorway.

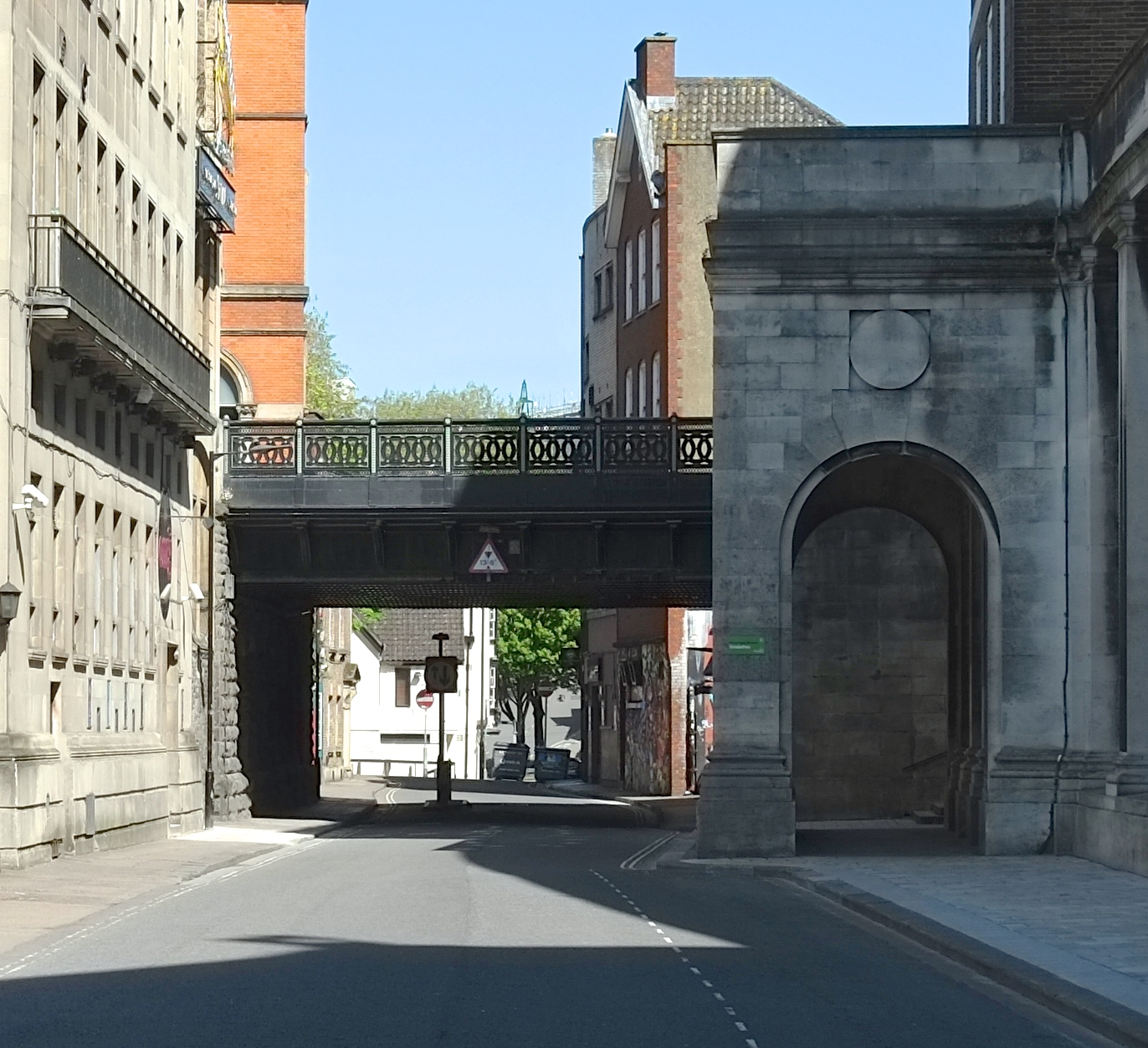
The Park Street Viaduct from Frog Lane.

== Sources ==
- Andrew Foyle, 'Pevsner Architectural Guides: Bristol', Yale University Press (2004) ISBN 0-300-10442-1
- Walter Ison, The Georgian Buildings of Bristol, Kingsmead Press (1978) ISBN 0-901571-88-1
