= Old Library, Bristol =

Listed building in Bristol, England

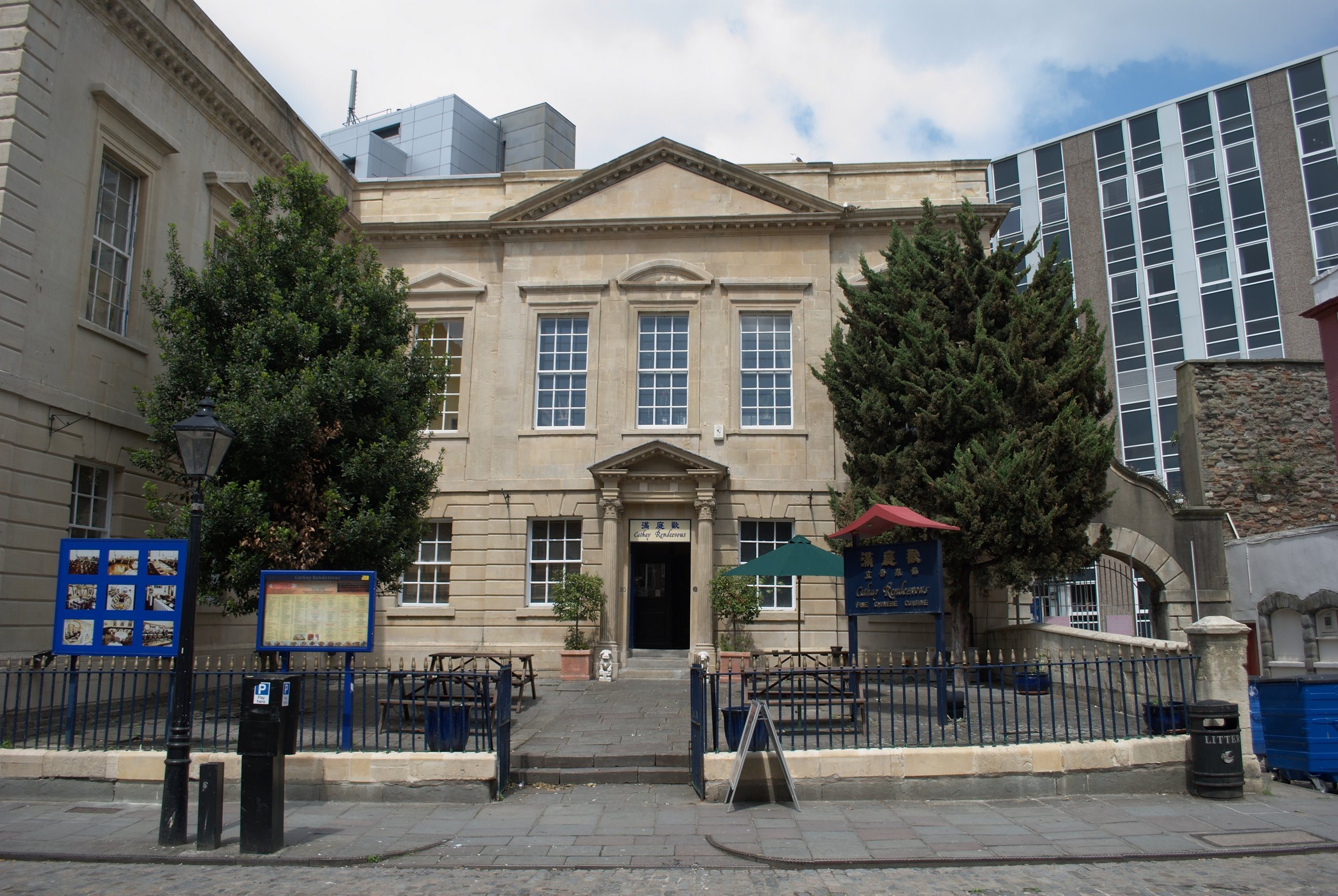
- Old Library in 2010

- Location within Bristol

General information
- Location: King Street, Bristol, England
- Coordinates: 51°27′07″N 2°35′43″W
- Year built: 1738–40

Listed Building – Grade II*
- Official name: The Old Library and attached front area, wall pier and railings
- Designated: 8 January 1959
- Reference no.: 1282241

The Old Library is a historic building on the north side of King Street in Bristol, England. It was built in 1738–40 and has been designated by English Heritage as a Grade II* listed building.

Until 1906 it housed the main collections of Bristol's public library, which was one of the first in England when it was founded in 1613 on the same site. Users of the library included Samuel Taylor Coleridge, Robert Southey and Humphry Davy. From 1779 the building also contained one of the country's first public displays of fossils.

== History ==
Founded in 1613, Bristol's public library was only preceded in England by those of Norwich in 1608 and Ipswich in 1612. It was originally housed in the King Street lodge of Bristol merchant Robert Redwood, who donated it to Bristol Corporation. When this building decayed the city replaced it in 1738–40 on the same site.

In 1772 the King Street library was taken over by the Bristol Library Society, a subscription library. Over time its private membership would include Samuel Taylor Coleridge, Robert Southey and Humphry Davy. Southey joined in 1793 and his very first borrowing, William Enfield's History of Philosophy, contained utopian material which gave him ideas for a "Southeyopolis", recorded in his correspondence of that year. This was months in advance of his development of Pantisocracy with Coleridge in 1794. In 1795 his borrowings of Classical history books corresponded to topics he was covering in a series of public lectures in Bristol.

In the 19th century, complaints were recorded both by the Bristol Library Society, which wanted the space occupied by the city's collection for its own books, and by the Bristol public, who were denied access to both collections. The city eventually ejected the society, making the library free to the public from 1856. In 1876 after a refurbishment it was renamed as the Central Library.

In 1899 Vincent Stuckey Lean left a bequest of £50,000 for a new library building. As a result, in 1906 the library was moved to the newly built Bristol Central Library on College Green. The King Street building eventually became a restaurant.

Notable 19th-century city librarians include, James Fawckner Nicholls (1868–83) and John Taylor (1883–93), who were co-authors of Bristol Past and Present (1881–82).

== Architecture and fittings ==
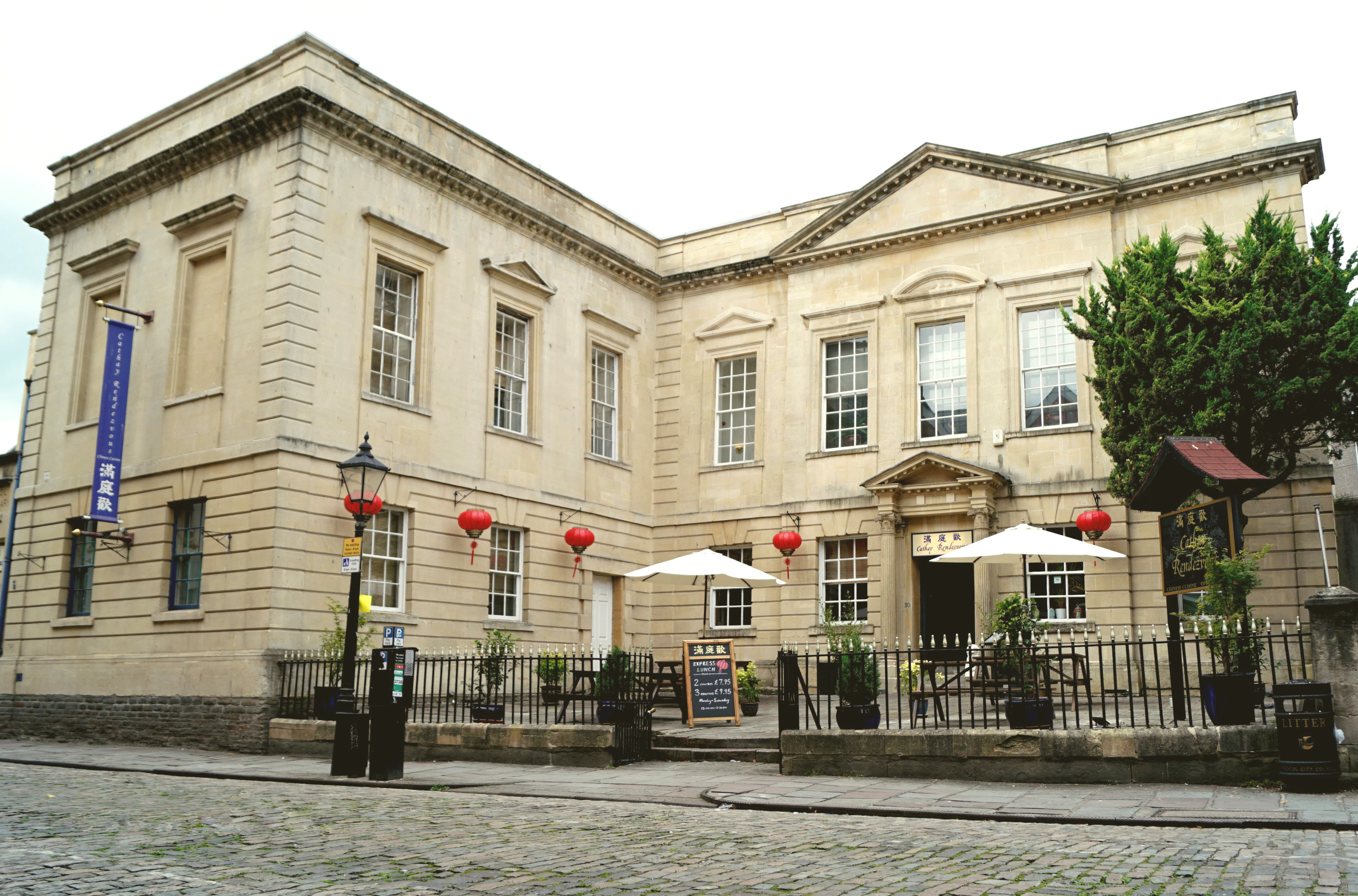
The Bristol old library in 2017, which has been running as Chinese restaurant, Cathay Rendezvous, since 1986.

The present King Street building dates from 1738–40. It was built in the early Georgian Palladian style, with a five-window front including a three-window centre with a pediment. The shallow porch, which has fluted Composite columns, is unobtrusive in a similar way to other buildings of the 1730s in Bristol.

It was probably designed by the stonemason and carver James Paty the Elder, the first in a succession of members of the Paty family prominent as builders of 18th-century Bristol, although John Strahan has also been suggested as a possible architect. Another possibility that has been suggested is William Halfpenny. The imposing and disproportionately tall first storey of the Old Library was echoed in Halfpenny's designs a few years later for Clifton Court and Coopers' Hall, although this could have been an imitation of Paty's design.

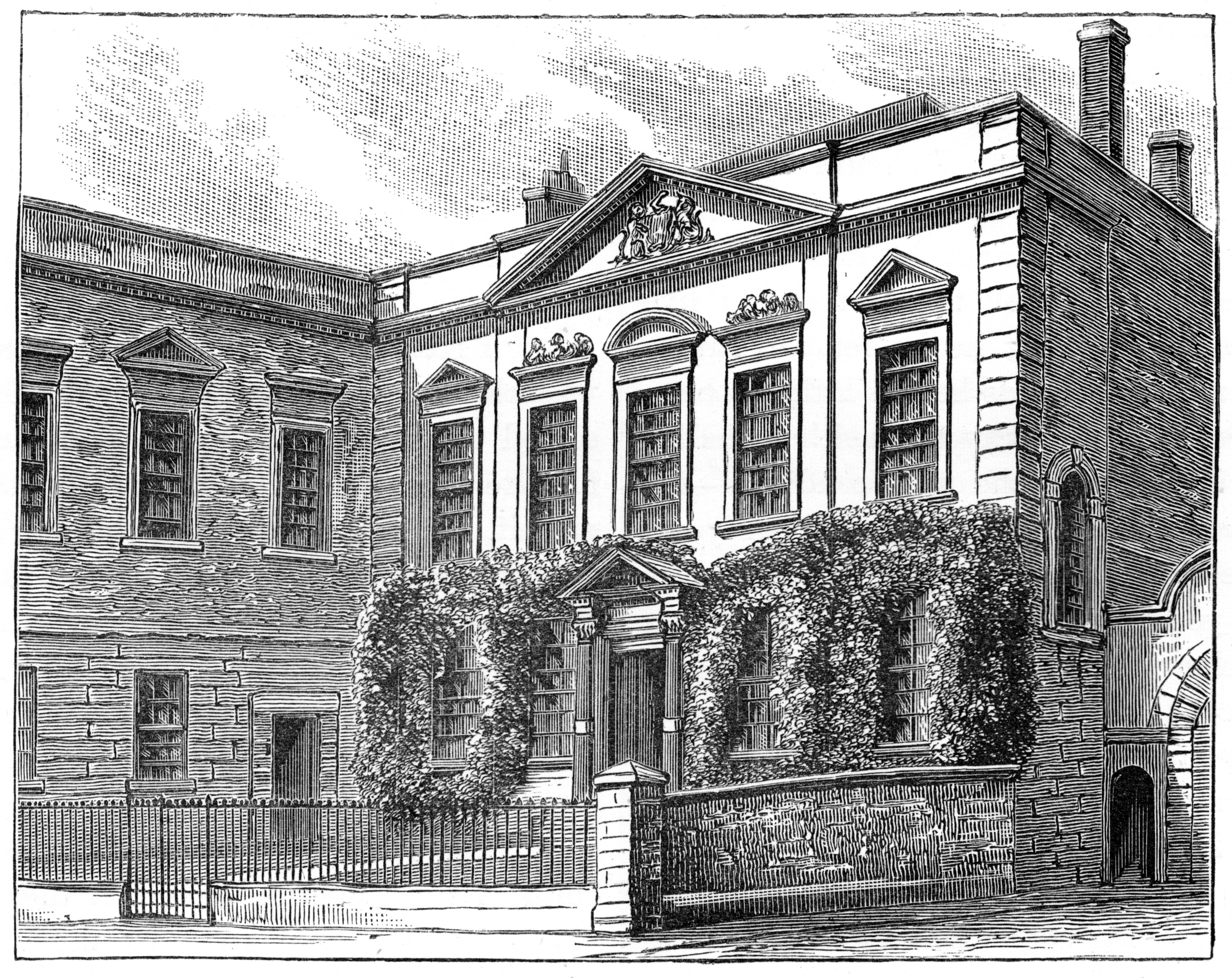
The library in 1876.

It is believed that Paty did carve the building's ornamentation. Unfortunately, many of the decorative features have been lost over time and as a result of repairs. Decaying features such as a fine Bristol coat of arms on the pediment, figures of putti depicted reading books above the first floor windows, and much of the mouldings and other details, were removed in the 20th century instead of being restored. One of the putti may have survived; there is one on the wall of St Michael on the Mount Primary School on St Michael's Hill in Bristol, which may have come from the library.

A west wing, projecting towards the street, was added in the late 18th century.

The Old Library's reading room had contained antique furniture and fittings, including an ornate oak overmantel carved by Grinling Gibbons. These were moved to the Bristol Room of the new Central Library.

== Former collections ==
A forerunner of the public library was the library of the Parish Church of St Leonard's; the vicars being the first librarians. In 1613 the library's founding collection was the donation of Tobias Matthew, the Archbishop of York, who was born in Bristol. In 1906 it was transferred to the new Central Library, which also reacquired the Bristol Library Society's reference collection of 45,000 books.

In the 19th century the library was the first in the country to establish a "Local Collection", containing local history books and maps. Since then the Central Library's Local Studies Service has gone on to gain "designated status" under the national Designation Scheme.

The Old Library housed one of the first public displays of fossils in the country, obtained in 1779 from the bequest by the Bristolian geologist Alexander Catcott of his collections of books, fossils and minerals. Later transferred to the Bristol Museum, the fossils were destroyed in World War II. However Catcott's books were in the new Central Library and survived.

== See also ==
- Grade II* listed buildings in Bristol
