= Alexander Catcott =

English geologist and theologian (1725–1779)

The Reverend Alexander Catcott (1725–1779) was an English geologist and theologian. Born in Bristol, he became the vicar of Temple Church, Bristol and authored numerous works on science and theology.

He was the son of Reverend Alexander Stopford Catcott M.A., headmaster of Bristol Grammar School, and Martha Symes, and brother of George Symes Catcott, the friend of Thomas Chatterton. His views on the Bible as a scientific source were influenced by the ideas of John Hutchinson (1674–1737) and are expressed in his A Treatise on the Deluge. This identified the Chinese cultural hero Fu Xi with Biblical Noah.

Catcott left his book collection and two cabinets of his fossils and minerals as a bequest to Bristol's public library. These were housed in the Old Library on King Street and were one of the first public displays of fossils in the country. Later transferred to the Bristol Museum, the fossils were destroyed in World War II. However Catcott's books were in the new Central Library building and survived.

== Sources ==
- E. H. W. Meyerstein, "A Life of Thomas Chatterton" (1930)
- "Anecdotes of Chatterton and his associates", The Gentleman's Magazine (July 1838) pp. 603–607
- Derya Gurses, "Academic Hutchinsonians and their quest for relevance, 1734–1790", History of European Ideas 31 (2005) pp. 408–427
- Clive Lovatt, "Alexander Catcott", Bristol Naturalists Bulletin 461(July 2007) pp. 6–9
- Wylie Sypher, "Chatterton's African Eclogues and the Deluge", PMLA 54 (1939) pp. 246–260
- Anthony Beeson, "Bristol in 1807", Bristol:Redcliffe Press (2009) p. 32. ISBN 978-1-906593-26-1
