= Sterncourt Road bombing =

2026 grenade attack in Bristol, England

- Sterncourt Road bombing
- Location: 51°29′37″N 2°31′52″W; Sterncourt Road, Frenchay, South West England
- Date: 3 May 2026 c.6:32 a.m. (GMT)
- Target: Joanne Shaw
- Attack type: bombing; suicide bombing
- Weapon: hand grenade
- Deaths: 2 (Joanne Shaw and Ryan Kelly, the perpetrator)
- Injuries: 3
- Perpetrator: Ryan Kelly
- Motive: Under investigation

On 3 May 2026, 41-year-old Ryan Kelly forced his way into the home of his former partner, 35-year-old Jo Shaw, while carrying an explosive device thought to be a hand grenade. At 6:32 a.m.—following an approximately 15 minutes standoff between Kelly and members of the household—Kelly detonated the device, killing both himself and Shaw and injuring three others.

== Background ==
Bombings committed by a lone perpetrator are rare in the United Kingdom, with suicide bombings being more so. The last notable suicide bombing to occur in the country was the 2017 Manchester Arena bombing, which killed 22 people.

In the weeks prior to the bombing, the United Kingdom, specifically London, had been experiencing a growing trend of antisemitic violence, with a notable stabbing targeting Jews occurring just days prior to the bombing, resulting in the UK terror threat level to be raised to "severe". This would cause speculation about the nature of the incident by the media, prompting Avon and Somerset Police to reassure the public.

== Bombing ==
At 6:17 a.m. Avon and Somerset Police were alerted to a domestic-related incident at a home on Sterncourt Road, Frenchay. The subject of the call was allegedly that a man known to the residents had forced his way into the property. A neighbour reported hearing screaming and shouting from the house before the blast.

The caller remained on the line with the authorities, and claimed at approximately 6:30 a.m. that the man was armed with a grenade. Around two minutes later, the device was detonated; multiple people at adjacent homes reported hearing the explosion at 6:30 a.m. Police arrived shortly after at 6:34 a.m. Two people were killed in the explosion, and another three—a man, woman, and child—were injured. An eyewitness claimed the explosion occurred in the doorway of the home.

=== Aftermath ===
Within 15–20 minutes of the bombing, residents of Sterncourt Road and Froomshaw Road were evacuated and offered shelter at a nearby pub. Approximately 70 people were evacuated overall. Armed police were in attendance.

Initial media reports and even police statements on the attack did not mention the fact that the male victim was in fact the perpetrator, with this information being released by police 2 days later on 5 May.

== Victim ==
Joanne Shaw (1990/1991–3 May 2026) was a 35-year-old mother living at her parents' home with her child. She had relocated there apparently after breaking up with her partner, Ryan Kelly. She reportedly worked at a nearby tanning shop and was well liked around the local area, along with the rest of her family.

Shaw was praised following her death for apparently instructing her child to play on the trampoline, possibly saving his life.

== Perpetrator ==
On 5 May 2026, Shaw was named as the female victim in the incident, as well as Ryan Kelly (1984/1985 – 3 May 2026), the male victim and perpetrator of the bombing. Prior to the bombing, Kelly and Shaw were in a romantic relationship, with the child living at the home possibly being Kelly's. The couple were previously known to the authorities due to a history of domestic violence, and their relationship issues were known to those close to Shaw's family.

Kelly had already appeared in the news prior to the bombings for his involvement with a plot to establish a methamphetamine business, reportedly inspired by the American television series Breaking Bad. The plot was masterminded by 78-year-old George Rogers, who was already in prison for other offences and suffering with cancer. Kelly, along with nine others, were instructed to sell a kilogram of cocaine for £60,000 in order to purchase lab equipment from the Netherlands. However, those involved were arrested before they could commence the operation. The plot was reportedly uncovered after vehicles of those involved were bugged by the authorities.

Kelly was sentenced to five years in prison for this offence in July 2015, when he was 30 years old. At the latest, Kelly would have been released during 2020, however it is probable he was released earlier.

== Investigation ==
Following Kelly's identification as the perpetrator, an enquiry into his property in Speedwell, Bristol, began. Superintendent Matt Ebbs of Avon and Somerset Police was placed as the lead investigator into the incident. In a statement to the public, he claimed the bombing remained a "complex and sensitive investigation". He also reiterated the attack was not believed to be terror related, possibly in reaction to the recent string of antisemitic attacks across London.

== See also ==
- 1974 Bristol bombing
- List of mass murders committed using grenades
