= Mauretania (disambiguation) =

Mauretania was an ancient Berber kingdom.

Mauretania may also refer to:

== Places ==
- Mauritania or Mauretania, a modern country in Africa
- Colonial Mauritania, the colonial period in modern Mauritania
- Ancient Roman provinces of:
  - Mauretania Tingitana
  - Mauretania Caesariensis
  - Mauretania Sitifensis

== Ships ==
- RMS Mauretania (1906), an ocean liner in service until 1934
- RMS Mauretania (1938), an ocean liner scrapped in 1965

== Others ==
- Mauretania, a British Rail Class 40 diesel locomotive
- Mauretania Public House in Bristol
- Mauretania Comics

== See also ==
- Mauritius, an island in the Indian Ocean
