= Josiah Tucker =

Welsh economist (1713–1799)

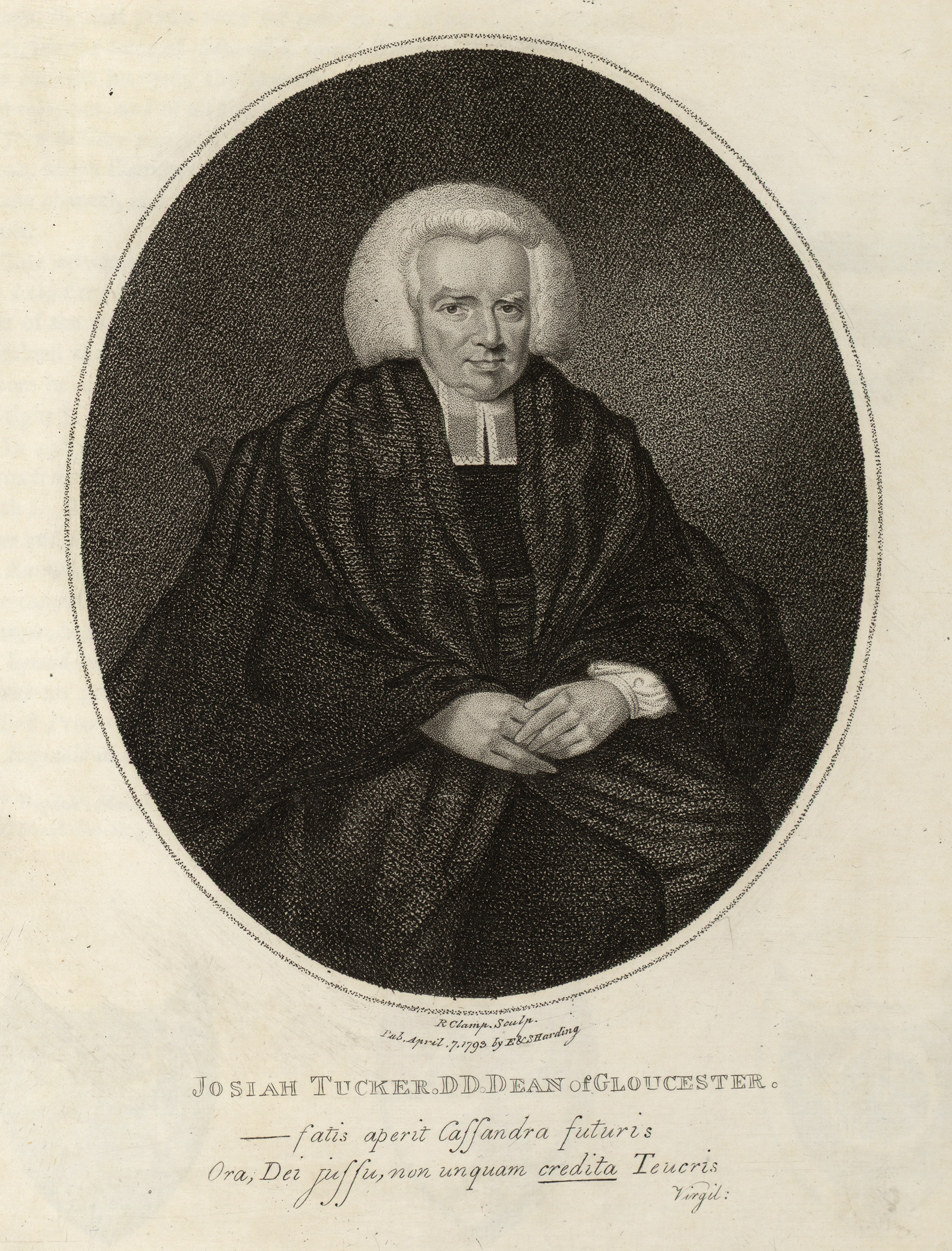
18th century engraving of Josiah Tucker

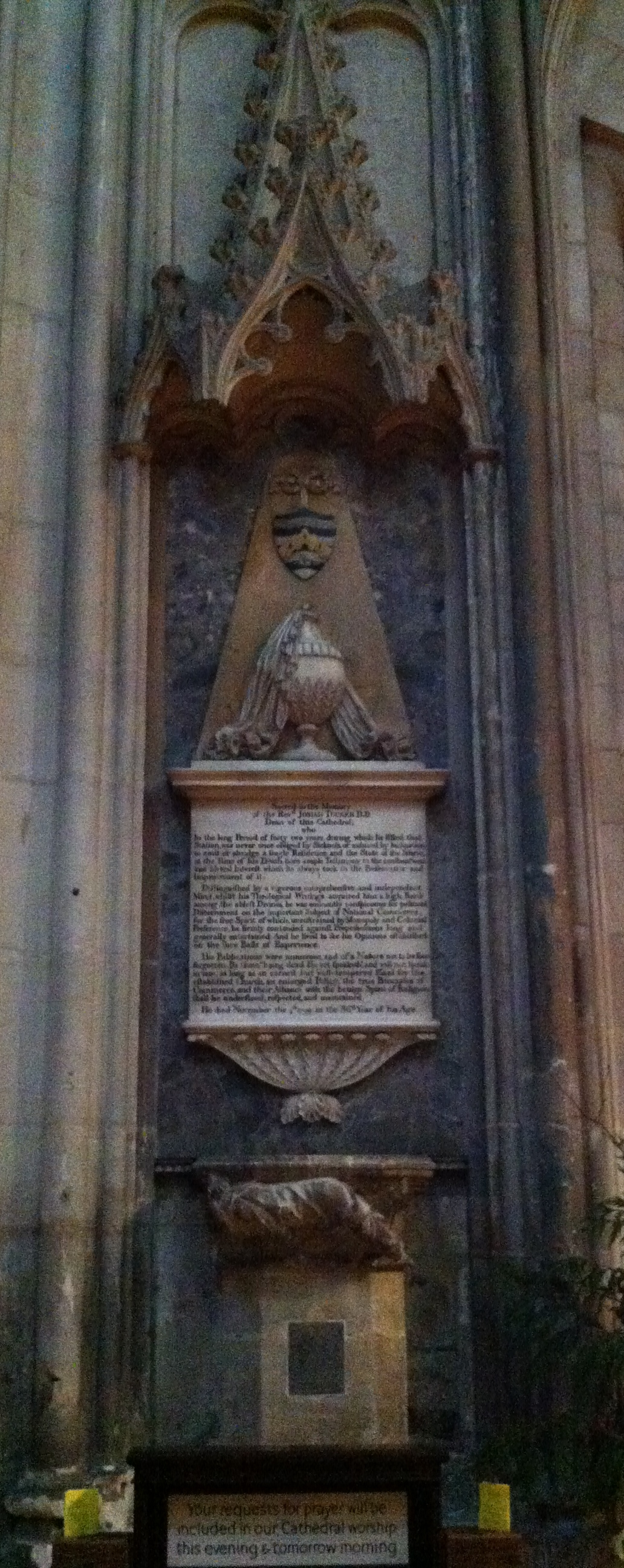
Memorial to Josiah Tucker in Gloucester Cathedral

Josiah Tucker (also Josias) (December 1713 – 4 November 1799), also known as Dean Tucker, was a Welsh churchman, known as an economist and political writer. He was concerned in his works with free trade, Jewish emancipation and American independence. He became Dean of Gloucester.

== Life ==
He was born at Laugharne, Carmarthenshire; his father inherited a small estate near Aberystwyth, and sent his son to Ruthin School, Denbighshire. Tucker obtained an exhibition at St John's College, Oxford. He graduated B.A. in 1736, M.A. in 1739, and DD in 1755.

In 1737 he became curate of St. Stephen's Church in Bristol, and two years later rector of All Saints' Church in the same city. He was appointed to a minor canonry in the cathedral, and was noticed by Bishop Joseph Butler, to whom he was for a time domestic chaplain. On the death of Alexander Stopford Catcott in 1749 Tucker was appointed by the chancellor to the rectory of St. Stephen's.

In 1754 Robert Nugent was elected for Bristol, supported by Tucker; Nugent's influence probably contributed to his preferment. He was appointed to the third prebendal stall at Bristol on 28 October 1756, and on 13 July 1758 as Dean of Gloucester. Tucker, as Dean of Gloucester, saw something of William Warburton, who became bishop in 1759, having previously been Dean of Bristol. They did not like each other, and, according to Tucker, the bishop said that the dean made a religion of his trade and a trade of his religion. (According to another version, the person said to make a trade of his religion was Samuel Squire, who succeeded Warburton as Dean of Bristol.)

He became infirm, and in 1790 asked to resign his rectory at Bristol on condition that his curate might succeed to it. The chancellor refused to give the required promise, until, at Tucker's request, his petitioners signed a petition on behalf of the curate. Tucker then resigned, and the curate was appointed. Tucker died on 4 November 1799 and was buried in the south transept of Gloucester Cathedral, where a monument was erected to his memory.

== Works and views ==
His first published work was an attack on Methodism. Tucker became conspicuous in the controversy which arose in 1771 as to the proposed abolition of clerical subscription to the Thirty-Nine Articles. He defended the Church of England against Andrew Kippis, but said that some relaxation of the terms of subscription was desirable.

At Bristol Tucker took an interest in matters of politics and trade. Recent research has shown how he was influenced by the meta-ethics and moral philosophy of Bishop Butler, which he transposed into Christian economic discourse at about mid-century. After some early tracts he first became generally known by pamphlets in favour of the measures for naturalising foreign Protestants and Jews, a view so unpopular that he was burnt in effigy at Bristol along with his pamphlets. In those Tucker was supporting Robert Nugent, who in 1753 introduced a bill in Parliament for the naturalisation of foreigners.

He made his name as an economist with A Brief Essay on the Advantages and Disadvantages which Respectively Attend France and Great Britain, with Regard to Trade (1749). It was translated into French and may have influenced the later French physiocrats (economistes). Tucker had a reputation for his knowledge of trade, and in 1755 was asked by Thomas Hayter, then bishop of Norwich and royal preceptor, to draw up a treatise called Elements of Commerce and the Theory of Taxes for the instruction of the future King (George III of Great Britain). A fragment was privately printed, but it was never completed. He has been suggested as a source of some of Adam Smith's ideas, even if for a century after his death he was dismissed as a pamphleteer writing controversial ephemera on questions of passing interest.

In 1757, he published a prescriptive travel guide called Instructions for Travellers. It was part of a larger, unpublished work also related to economics, probably requested by Thomas Hayter. The Instructions includes discussions of both moral and practical aspects of travel, as well as appropriate ways of recording observations.

He opposed warfare on economic grounds. In 1763 Tucker published a tract against ‘going to war for the sake of trade,’ which was translated by Turgot, who had previously translated one of the naturalisation pamphlets, and The Elements of Commerce and Theory of Taxes (privately printed, 1755), translated as Questions sur le commerce in 1753. He wrote in complimentary terms to Tucker some years later, and sent him a copy of the 'Réflexions sur la Formation des Richesses'. He mentions a visit of Tucker to Paris, but they were not personally acquainted.

Despite not sympathizing with American political goals, he was an opponent of British imperialism, on the reasoning that it was "impossible to compel distant settlements to trade with the parent state to any great degree beyond what their own interest would prompt them to." His assertion as early as 1749 that the American colonies would seek independence as soon as they no longer needed Britain has brought him to the attention of American historians. He consistently wrote in favour of American independence through the American Revolutionary War. He wrote pamphlets, including A Series of Answers to Certain Popular Objections Against Separating from the Rebellious Colonies (1776). Tucker argued with both Edmund Burke and John Wilkes over attitudes to Britain's American colonies and took a distinctive position on the American War of Independence. As early as 1766, he thought a separation inevitable. But he was also hostile to the Americans. He maintained in pamphlets that a separation from the colonies was desirable. He held that the supposed advantage of the colonial trade to the mother country was a delusion. On the other hand, he maintained that the colonies turned adrift would fall out with each other, and be glad to return to political union. The policy pleased nobody in England, and Tucker, though his views were approved in later years by many of the laisser-faire economists, was for a time treated as a Cassandra, a name under which he published in the newspapers. The most popular of his American tracts was Cui Bono? in the form of letters addressed to Jacques Necker (1781), arguing that the war was a mistake for all the nations concerned.

In political theory he was an opponent of the social contract theory which held all the mainstream writers of his day. In 1781 he published A Treatise Concerning Civil Government, attacking John Locke's principles as tending to democracy, and supporting the British constitution. In 1785 he again applied his theories to the disputes about Irish trade with Great Britain.

Tucker was an advocate for increase in British population, to the extent that he advocated a tax on bachelors; he welcomed immigrants and regretted the emigration to America. He embraced the free market, writing against monopoly in all its forms including the exclusive rights of overseas trading companies like the East India Company, decrying restrictive guild rules of apprenticeship, the Navigation Acts and other impediments to the rule of the unfettered marketplace.

== Family ==
Tucker's first wife was the widow of Francis Woodward of Grimsbury, Gloucestershire, and he educated his stepson, Richard Woodward, who subsequently became dean of Clogher and bishop of Cloyne. In 1781 Tucker married his housekeeper, Mrs. Crowe.

== Notes ==
Attribution

This article incorporates text from a publication now in the public domain: "Tucker, Josiah". Dictionary of National Biography. London: Smith, Elder & Co. 1885–1900.
