= 14 and 15 King Street, Bristol =

Historic warehouse building in King Street, Bristol, England

14 and 15 King Street
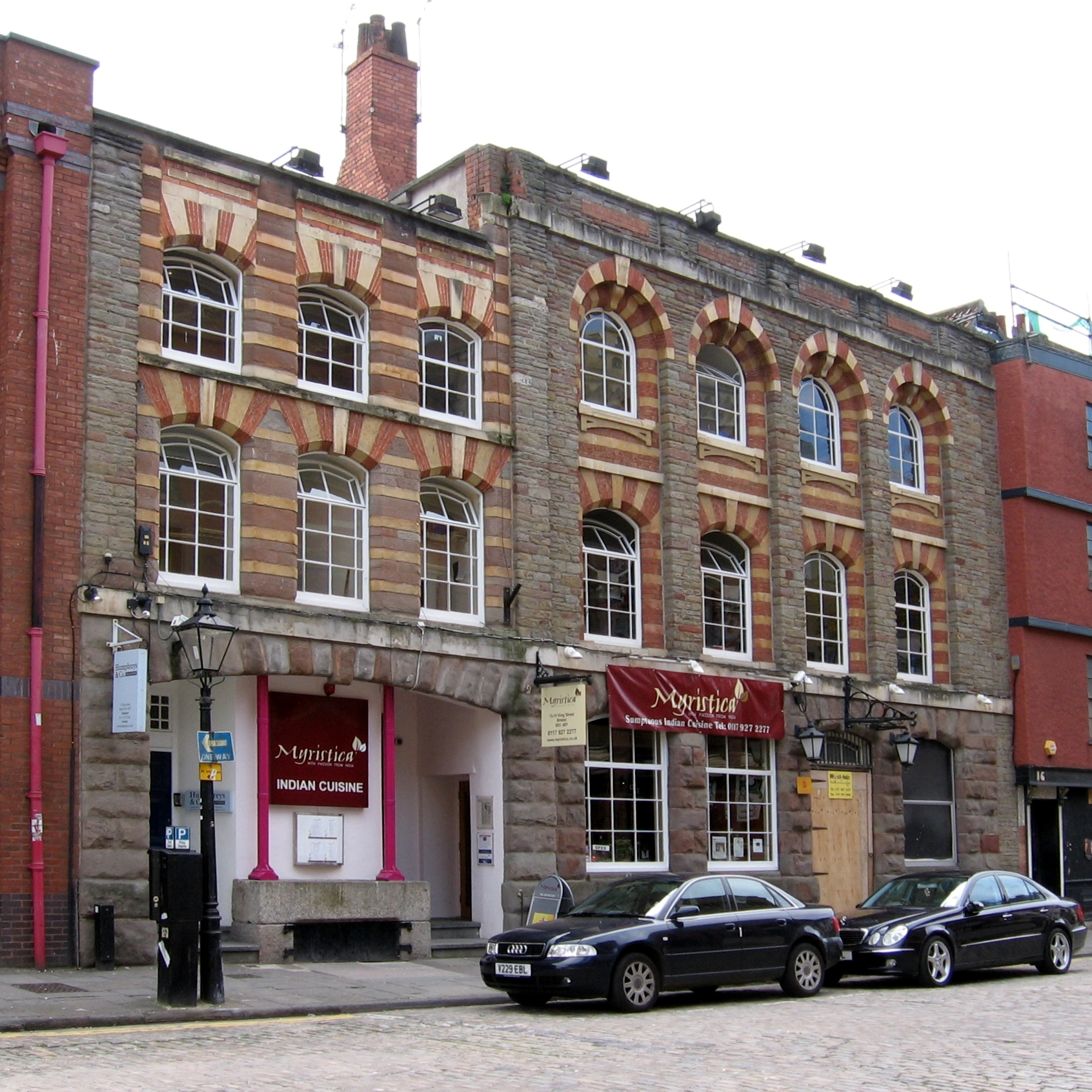

- Location within Bristol

General information
- Location: Bristol, England
- Coordinates: 51.4517°N 2.5941°W
- Completed: c. 1860

14 and 15 King Street is the address of a historic warehouse building on King Street, Bristol, England. It was built around 1860 and is now occupied by a restaurant and offices.

The contemporary 32 King Street is of similar design. It has been designated by English Heritage as a grade II listed building.

== See also ==
- Grade II listed buildings in Bristol
