= 7 and 8 King Street, Bristol =

Historic houses in Bristol, England

7 and 8 King Street
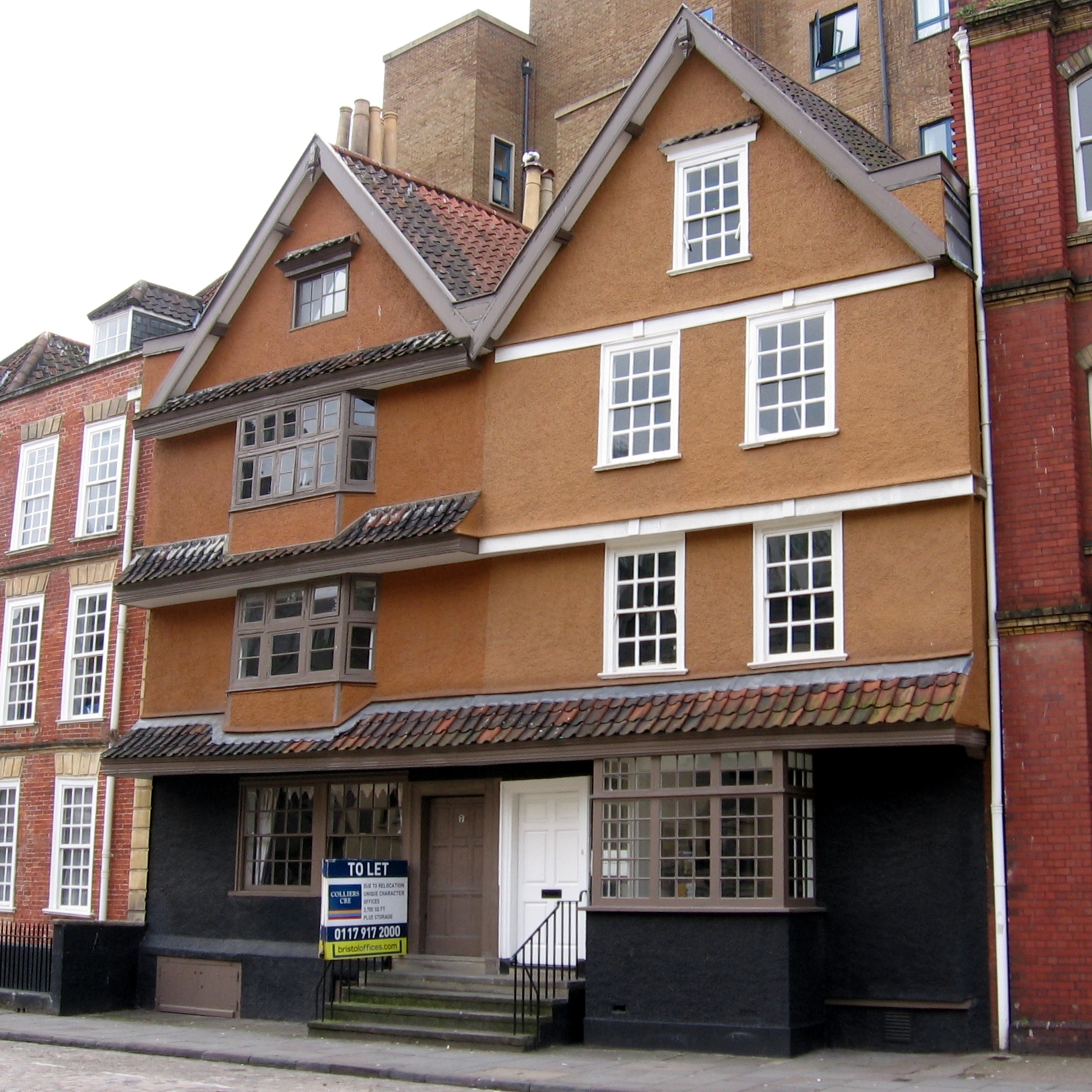

- Location within Bristol

General information
- Location: King Street, Bristol, England
- Coordinates: 51.4518°N 2.5937°W
- Year built: 1665

Technical details
- Structural system: Timber frame

Listed Building – Grade II*
- Official name: 7 and 8, King Street
- Designated: 8 January 1959
- Reference no.: 1202326

7 and 8 King Street are a pair of historic houses situated on King Street in Bristol, England.

They date from 1665. During restoration in 1976 it was found that recycled ships timbers had been used for much of the oak studding and bracing in the buildings, and barrel staves had been used as laths. The oriel window of No. 7 is an original feature, whilst the windows of No. 8 were replaced during the 18th century.

Nos. 7 and 8 King Street have been designated by English Heritage as a Grade II* listed building.

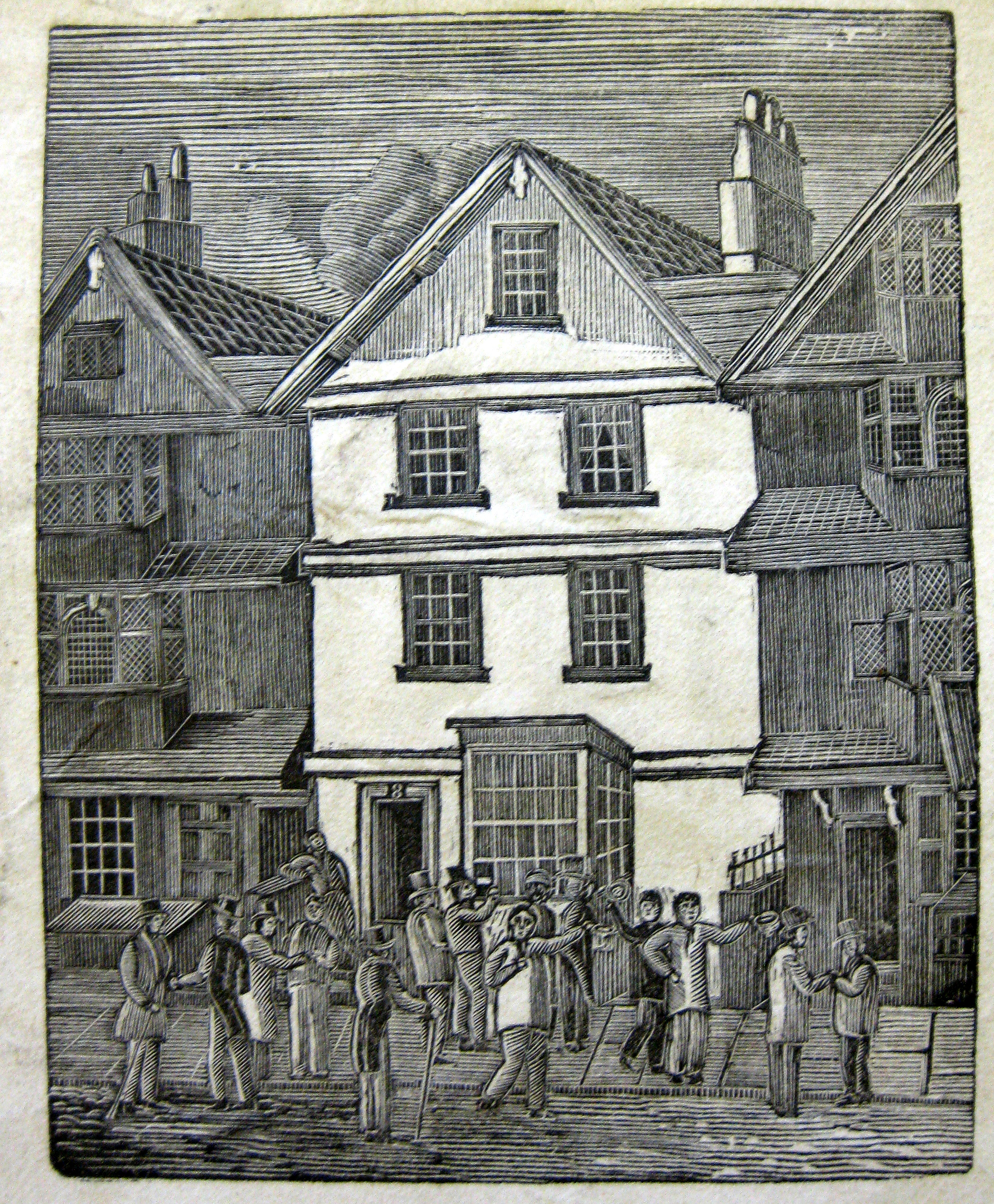
8 King Street Bristol, published in 1832 in a printed broadside entitled 'The Bribery Box', now in the collections of the Bristol Central Library

== See also ==
- Grade II* listed buildings in Bristol
