= 32 King Street, Bristol =

Building in Bristol, England

32 King Street
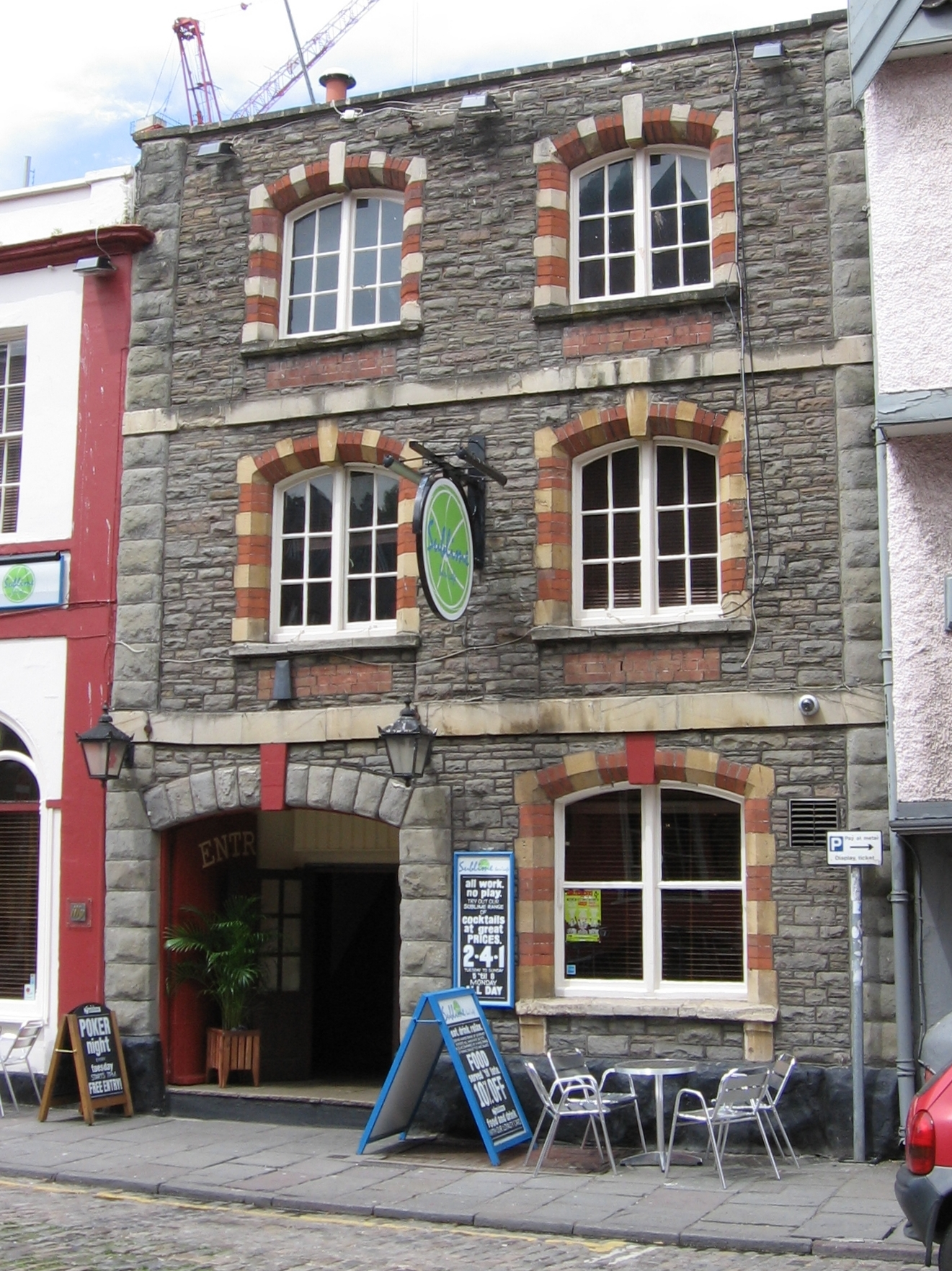

- Location within Bristol

General information
- Location: Bristol, England
- Coordinates: 51.4519°N 2.5945°W
- Completed: c. 1860

32 King Street is the address of a historic warehouse building in King Street, Bristol, England.

It was built around 1860 and is now occupied by a restaurant. The contemporary 14 and 15 King Street are of similar design.

It has been designated by English Heritage as a grade II listed building.

== See also ==
- Grade II listed buildings in Bristol
