= The Old Duke, Bristol =

Pub and music venue in Bristol, England

The Old Duke
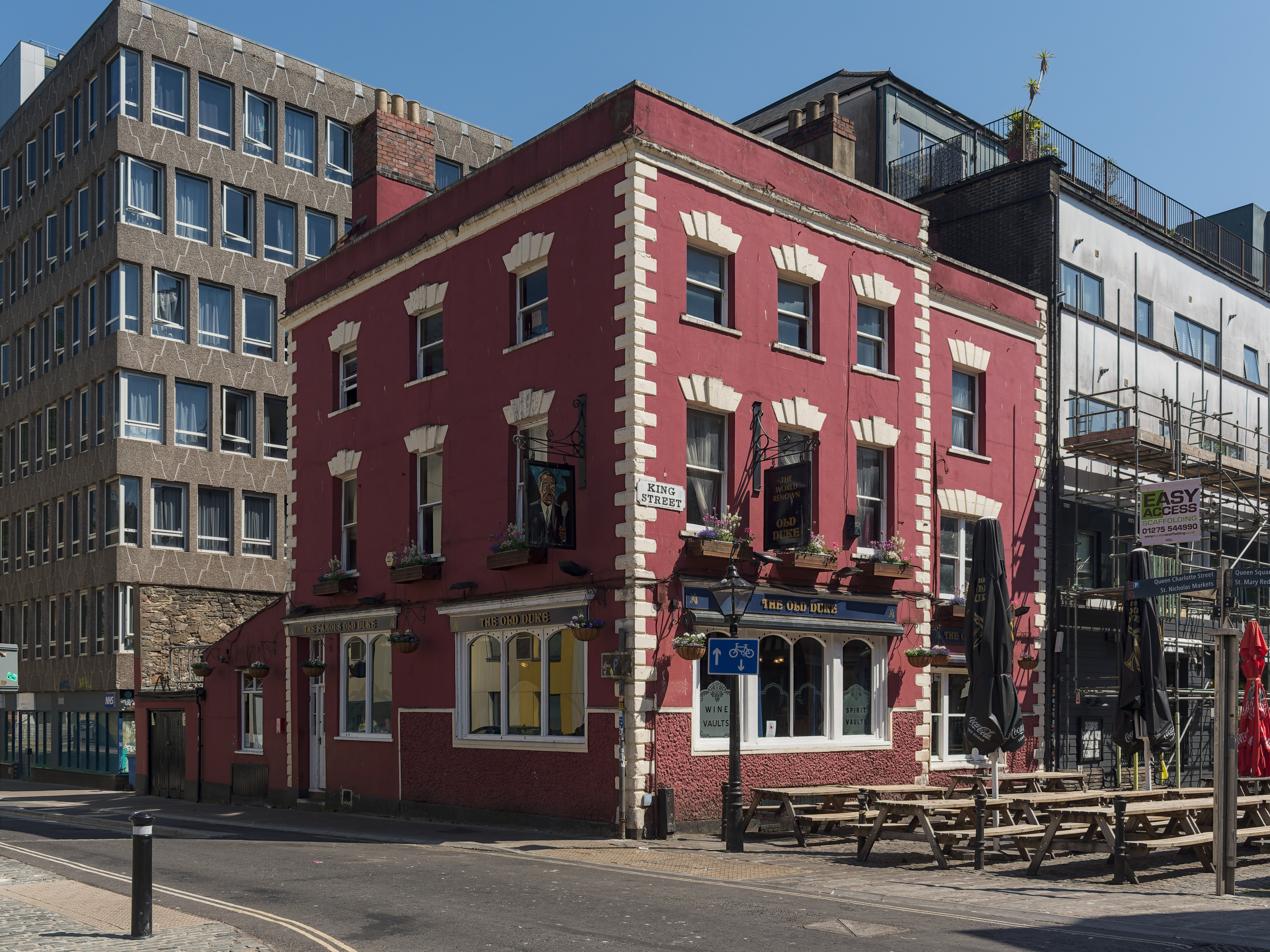
- The Old Duke

- Location within Bristol

General information
- Location: Bristol, England
- Coordinates: 51.4521°N 2.5932°W
- Completed: 1780

The Old Duke is a jazz and blues venue and pub in the English city of Bristol. Live music is played every night of the week, admission is free and it hosts an annual Jazz Festival. The pub's name is a reference to the classic American jazz musician Duke Ellington, though the pub has actually held the same (or similar) name since it was built, and most likely previously referred to the Duke of Cumberland.

The pub dates from about 1775, an entry appearing in Sketchley's Bristol Directory of that year, for Lewis Jenkins, victualler, Lodging & Board, 'Duke of Cumberland', 44 King Street, and is a grade II listed building.

The pub's heritage lies with traditional, New Orleans inspired jazz. Bands include the Blue Notes and the Severn Jazzmen, both of whom have been playing at the venue for over 35 years, Keith Little's Hot Six, Cass Caswell's Allstars, The University of Bristol Traditional Jazz Band, and many touring bands from around the world.

The resident blues musician Eddie Martin, who boasts numerous international awards, plays every Sunday night. The Duke also plays host to modern jazz bands including Andy Hague, Dave Betts, Code Red and The Cut Collective. Artists such as Peter Roe and Beth Rowley began their careers at the venue and still perform there regularly.

In 2009, The Old Duke was named by the Brecon Jazz Festival as one of 12 venues which had made the most important contributions to jazz music in the United Kingdom.

The Old Duke is located opposite the Llandoger Trow, another notable Bristol pub.
