= King Street, Bristol =

Street in Bristol, England

King Street
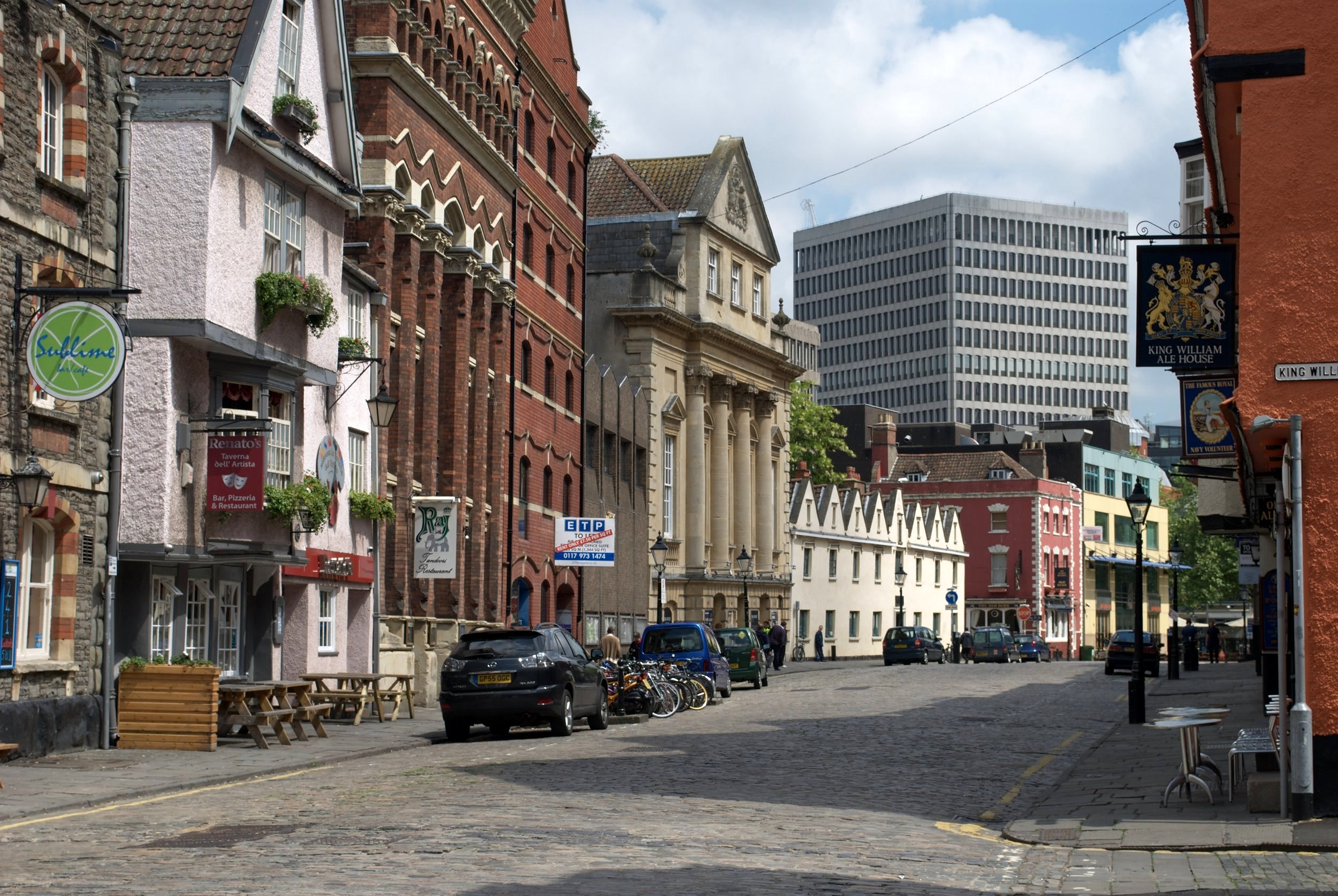
- Partial view of King Street

- Location within Bristol
- Location: Bristol, England
- Postal code: BS1
- Coordinates: 51°27′06″N 2°35′41″W

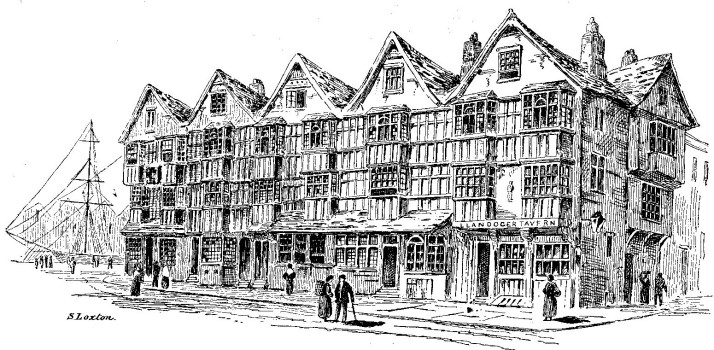
A 19th-century view of 1–5 King Street by Samuel Loxton

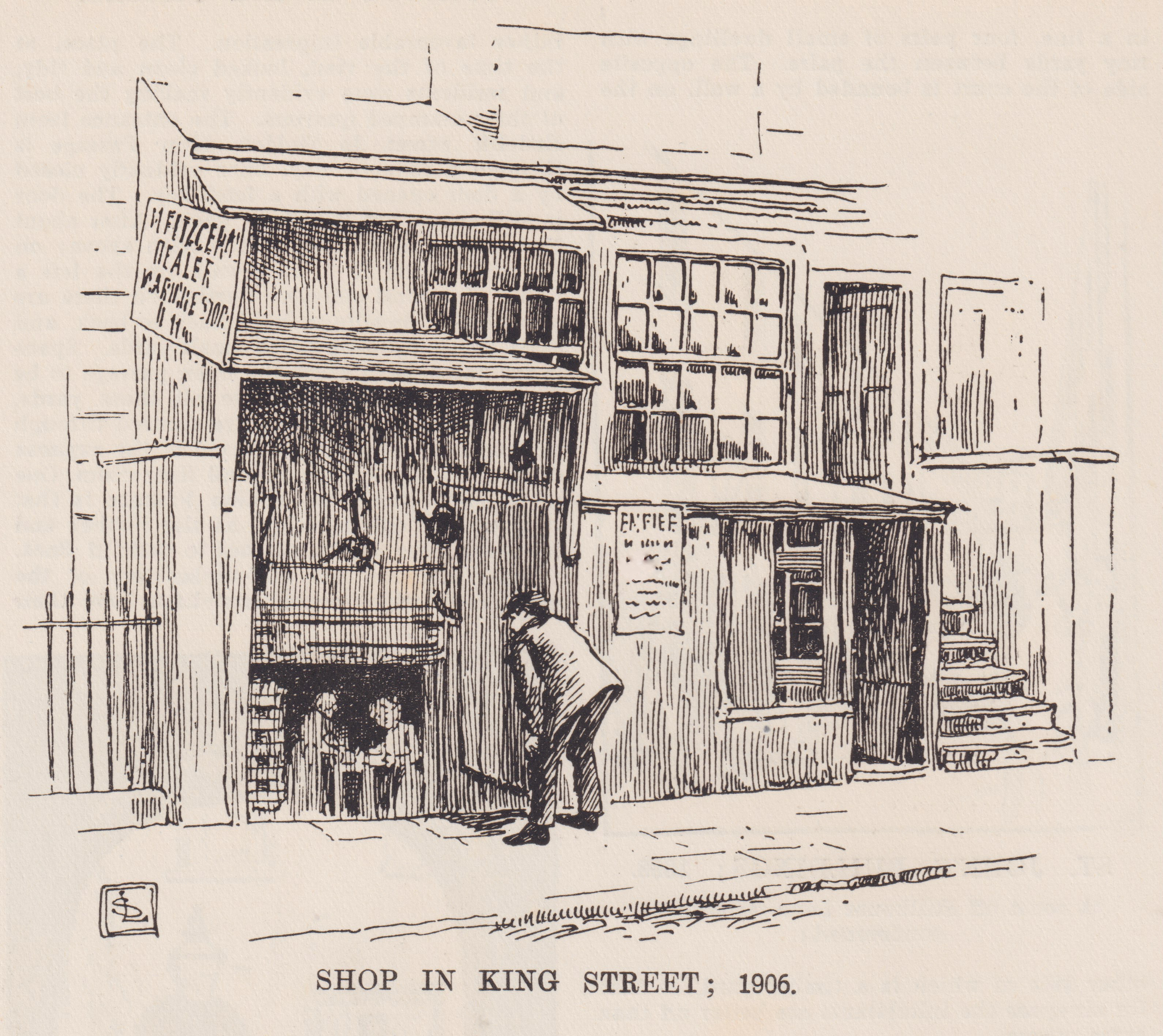
Shop on King Street, 1906

King Street is a 17th-century street in the historic city centre of Bristol, England.

The street lies just south of the old town wall and was laid out in 1650 to develop the Town Marsh, the area then lying between the south or Marsh Wall and the Avon. The north side was developed first and the south side in 1663, when the street was named after Charles II.

The section of the city wall is a scheduled ancient monument.

== Historic buildings ==
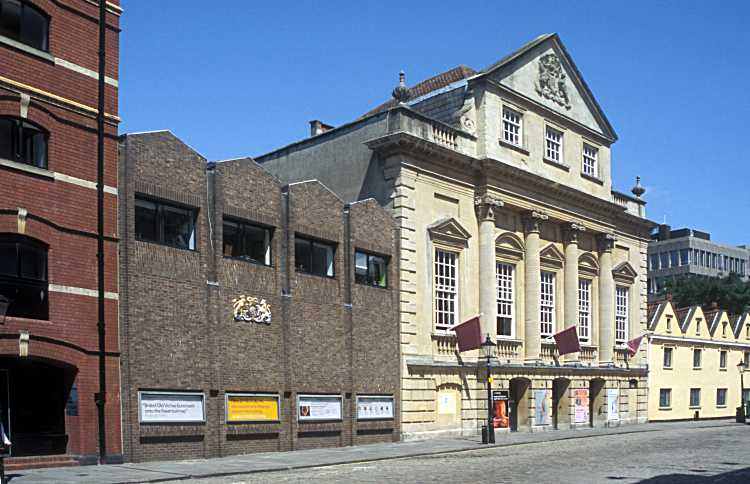
The Coopers' Hall (right)

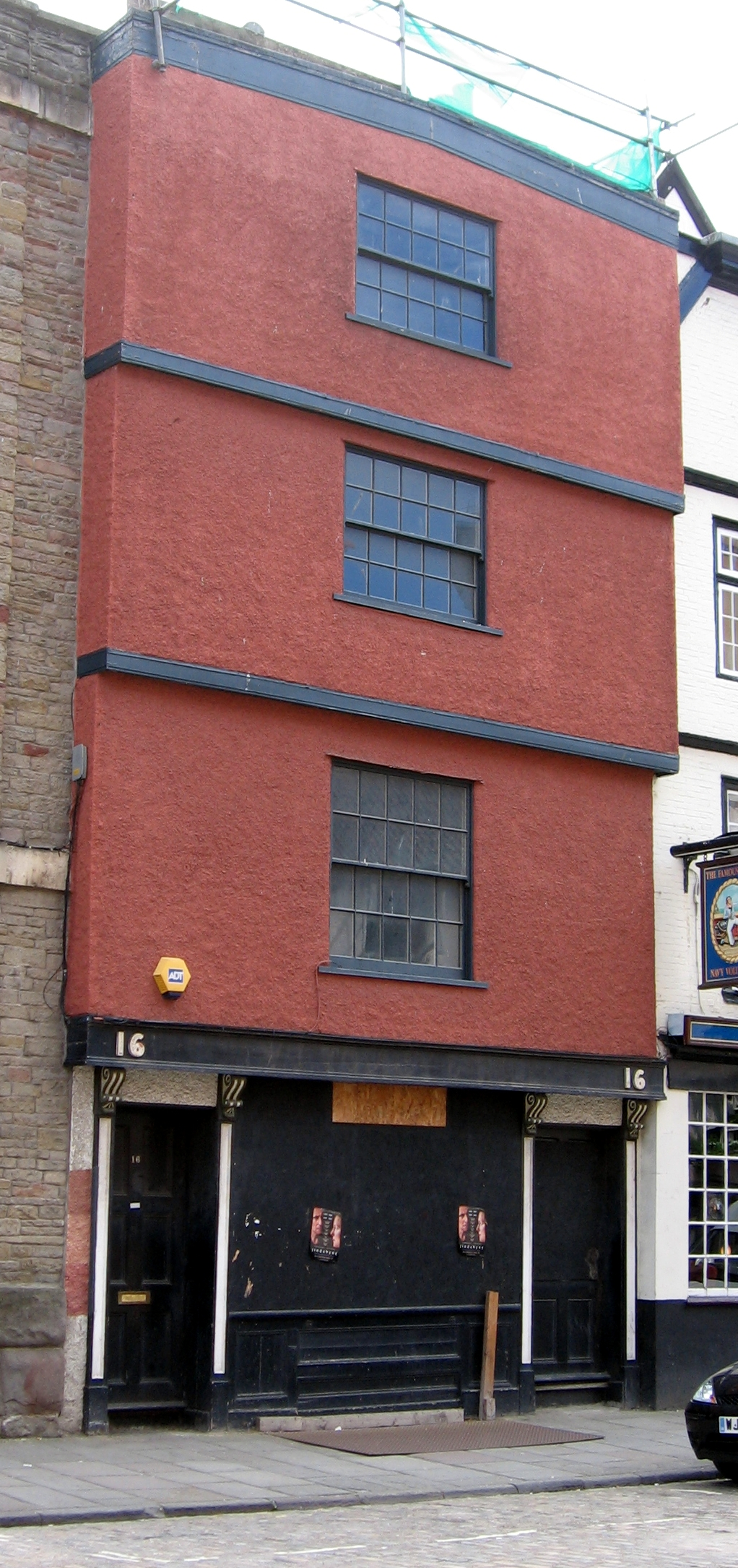
16 King Street

Among the historic buildings on the street are:

- The Llandoger Trow, originally merchants' houses, now a historic public house (1664)
- The Old Duke, a public house (1780s)
- St Nicholas' Almshouses (1652)
- Theatre Royal (1766) and Coopers' Hall (1743), both now part of the Bristol Old Vic.
- No. 6 an example of an early Georgian frontage. It dates from c. 1665, but the present early Georgian frontage dates from about 1720. It is thought that the original roof had gables, like those seen on the neighbouring Nos. 7 and 8, which were cut back to form the hips seen today. The interior retains many 18th-century features. It has been designated a Grade II* listed building.
- Nos. 7–8 date from 1665. During restoration in 1976 it was found that recycled ships timbers had been used for much of the oak studding and bracing in the buildings, and barrel staves had been used as lathes. The oriel window of No. 7 is an original feature, whilst the windows of No. 8 were replaced during the 18th century. 7 and 8 King Street have been designated a Grade II* listed building.
- Nos. 14–15 were built around 1860 as a warehouse and are now occupied by a restaurant and offices. The contemporary No. 32 is of similar design. It has been designated a Grade II listed building.
- No. 16 is a historic house, which now serves as an office. It dates from around 1665 and was designated a Grade II* listed building by English Heritage on 8 January 1959. The house is a timber-framed four-storey building with a basement, and features an 18th-century timber parapet in front of the gable on the roof. The ground floor front dates to the 19th century. The inner staircase, to the right of the centre features "turned balusters and square newels with ball finials and roll-topped rail, door frames with ovolo mouldings and cyma stops".
- No. 17 dates from 1665 and has been designated a Grade II* listed building. Together with No. 18 it is operated as The Famous Royal Navy Volunteer pub.
- Nos. 19 and 20 are now partly occupied by the King William Ale House.
- No. 32 is a former warehouse building. It was built around 1860, and is now occupied by a restaurant. The contemporary Nos. 14 and 15 are of similar design. It has been designated a Grade II listed building.
- Nos. 33–34 (1653) are the only surviving buildings of the original development, including parts of the old town wall
- No. 35 was built around 1870 and is an example of the Bristol Byzantine style. A former cork warehouse, it is now an office/studio space. It has been designated a Grade II listed building.
- Old Library (1738–1740) probably by James Paty the Elder, now a Chinese restaurant
- Merchant Venturers Almshouses (1696–1699)

== Queen Square ==
Queen Square lies just to the south of King Street, and a small 21st-century open space connects the west end of King Street to the north-west corner of Queen Square.

== See also ==
- Grade II* listed buildings in Bristol

== Bibliography ==
- Andrew Foyle, Bristol, Pevsner Architectural Guides (2004) ISBN 0-300-10442-1
