= James Paty the Younger =

English mason, builder and architect

- Born: 1718
- Died: 1779 (aged 60–61)
- Occupation: Architect

James Paty the Younger (1718–1779) was an English mason, builder and architect. He was a member of the Paty family which was prominent in the building of 18th century Bristol. He was the partner of his brother Thomas Paty in some of his building developments. He is also thought to have been the site architect during the rebuilding of Stoke Park House at Stoke Gifford.

== Paty family ==
James was the younger brother of Thomas Paty. He was not the son, but probably the nephew or some other relation of James Paty the Elder. A link between them is provided by the existence of a copybook, which may have been passed down within the family. Drawings within it have been tentatively attributed to each of these three men. However, they each operated out of different workshops, that of the younger James being in Horse Street. In 1755 he was admitted as a burgess of Bristol, by right of marriage to his wife Mary. He died in 1779 leaving a son, John.

== Works ==
James was a partner or collaborator with Thomas in building developments around Park Street and Clifton.

He was the principal mason and probably site architect at Stoke Park House. He was working there to the design of Thomas Wright, but may also have contributed some design of his own. Thomas Paty was also involved there as a mason.

The role of architect at the Theatre Royal has been attributed to him by some commentators. However, this is doubtful and is more commonly credited to Thomas Paty.

=== List of works ===
- Stoke Park House (c. 1760)
- Monument to William Paston (d. 1769) in the Church of St James the Elder, Horton, Gloucestershire.
- Monument to John Foyle (d. 1771) at St Philip and St Jacob, Bristol.
