= Bullock's Park =

Estate in Bristol, England between College Green and Brandon Hill

Coordinates: 51.45349°N 2.60282°W

Bullock's Park was an estate in Bristol, England between College Green and Brandon Hill. The last owner, Nathaniel Day, obtained permission to develop it in 1740 although building did not begin until 1761. The area now corresponds to Park Street, Berkeley Square and Berkeley Crescent.
