= James Fawckner Nicholls =

English librarian and antiquarian

- Born: 26 May 1818; Sidmouth, Devon, England
- Died: 19 September 1883 (aged 65); Goodwick, Fishguard, Pembrokeshire, Wales
- Occupations: Antiquarian; librarian

James Fawckner Nicholls (26 May 1818 – 19 September 1883) was an English antiquarian and librarian.

== Life ==
From a Cornish background, he was born on 26 May 1818 at Sidmouth in Devon, the son of a builder there; his mother was a daughter of Captain James Fawkner of Plymouth. In 1830 he went to sea with an uncle. Two years later he was sent to school at Kentisbeare for six months. He was then taken into the drapery business, and after a short period bought an establishment for himself at Benwick in the Isle of Ely. He next kept a school at Ramsey; and then moved to Manchester, where he was traveller for a firm of paper-stainers. In 1860 he settled in Bristol, where he ran a paper-staining business for eight years.

In 1868 Nicholls was appointed city librarian of Bristol. The old city library, founded in 1613, was reconstituted in 1885-6 and reopened by the City Council. Under Nicholls' direction it was extended into three free branch libraries, all in poor areas of the city St Philip's (1876), St James (1877), and Bedminster (1878). In 1876 he was elected a fellow of the Society of Antiquaries of London. Taylor is best known for the publication of the three volume, Bristol Past and Present, which he co-authored with fellow librarian John Taylor.

He died at Goodwick, Fishguard, Pembrokeshire, on 19 September 1883. Twice married, he left several children.

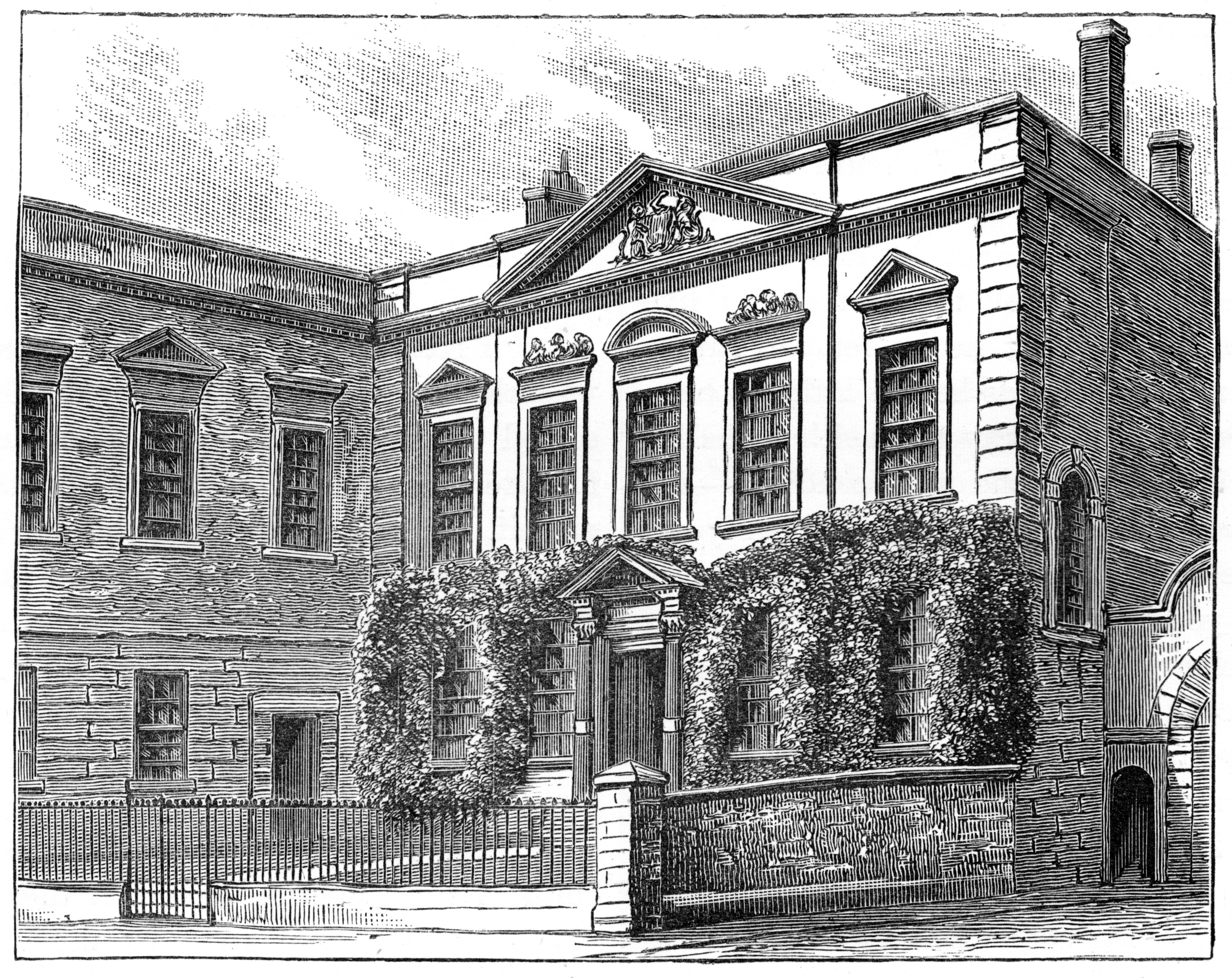
Bristol City Library, King Street, in 1876, illustration from James Fawckner Nicholls and John Taylor, Bristol Past and Present (1882)

== Bibliography ==
- Nicholls, J. F. (1869). The Remarkable Life, Adventures and Discoveries of Sebastian Cabot of Bristol, the Founder of Great Britain's Maritime Power, Discoverer of America, and its First Colonizer. London: Sampson Low, son and Marston. Quoted by Jules Verne in his Explorations of the World. It was criticised by Marie-Armand d'Avezac de Castera-Macaya and Henry Stevens, particularly for its failure to recognise the mounting evidence that Sebastian Cabot's father, John Cabot, led the early Bristol expeditions.
- Nicholls, J. F. (1870). Bristol biographies. part 1, Alderman John Whitson. Bristol: Arrowsmith.
- Nicholls, J. F. (1870). Bristol biographies. Part 2, Capt. Thomas James and George Thomas, the philanthropist. Bristol: Arrowsmith.
- Nicholls, J. F. (1874). How to see Bristol: A guide for the excursionist, the naturalist and the archaeologist. Bristol: Arrowsmith. Reprinted in multiple editions up to 1910.
- Nicholls, J. F. (1875). "Old deeds of All Hallow Church, Bristol". Journal of the British Archaeological Association. 31 (3): 259–265. doi:10.1080/00681288.1875.11904342.
- Nicholls, J. F. (1875). Bristol and its Environs: Historical, Descriptive and Scientific: Modern Bristol. London: Houlston and Sons.
- Nicholls, J. F. (1880). "Pen Park Hole. A Roman Lead Mine" (PDF). Transactions of the Bristol and Gloucestershire Archaeological Society. 4: 320–28.
- Nicholls, J. F. (1880). "Description of a Find of Roman Coins at Filton". Proceedings of the Society of Antiquaries.
- Nicholls, J. F.; Taylor, John (1881). Bristol Past and Present, Vol I - Civil History. Bristol: Arrowsmith.
- Nicholls, J. F.; Taylor, John (1881). Bristol Past and Present, Vol II - Ecclesiastical History. Bristol: Arrowsmith.
- Nicholls, J. F.; Taylor, John (1882). Bristol Past and Present, Vol III - Civil and Modern History. Bristol: Arrowsmith.
- Nicholls, J. F. (1883). The Old Hostelries of Bristol. Bristol: Arrowsmith. Reprinted from the Transactions of the Bristol and Gloucestershire Archaeological Society, v.7, part 2.

== Notes ==
Attribution

This article incorporates text from a publication now in the public domain: Lee, Sidney, ed. (1894). "Nicholls, James Fawckner". Dictionary of National Biography. Vol. 40. London: Smith, Elder & Co.
