= 1974 Bristol bombing =

Provisional IRA bomb attack in Bristol

Coordinates: 51.4544°N 2.603°W

- Part of the Troubles
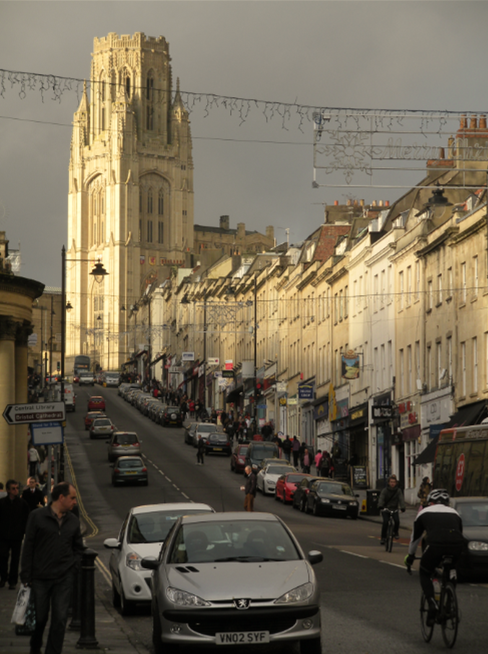
- Park Street Bristol where the bombing took place
- Location: Bristol, England
- Date: 18 December 1974; 7:54 pm (UTC)
- Attack type: Bombing
- Deaths: 0
- Injuries: 20
- Perpetrator: Provisional Irish Republican Army

The 1974 Bristol bombing was a twin bomb attack carried out by the Provisional IRA in a shopping street in Bristol city centre on 18 December 1974. A bomb was placed in a holdall outside Dixons Photographic shop on Park Street which exploded just before 8 pm. Nine minutes later another more powerful bomb detonated in a dustbin 30 yards away. The blasts injured 20 people and was part of the IRA's bombing campaign in England. The IRA gave a telephone warning for the first bomb but not the second one.

The "come-on" tactic of a second bomb was used weeks before in a bombing in London and had been used many times before in Northern Ireland.

The region was targeted by the IRA for a time. Eight days before Bristol, a bomb exploded in England at The Corridor in Bath, causing severe damage. Four days later a bomb exploded in Newport, South Wales. On 17 December 1978 Bristol was targeted by the IRA again in a bombing near Maggs Department Store in Clifton that injured at least seven people.

== See also ==
- Chronology of Provisional Irish Republican Army actions (1970–79)
