= James Paty the Elder =

English mason, builder and architect

- Died: 1748
- Occupation: Architect

James Paty the Elder (sometimes spelled Patty) (died 1748) was an English mason, builder and architect. He was the first in a succession of members of the Paty family prominent in the building of 18th century Bristol. He is thought to have been the architect of Bristol's Old Library on King Street.

== Paty family ==
There is no definite evidence for the relation of James to the other members of the Paty family. He was not the father, but probably the uncle or some other relation of Thomas Paty and James Paty the Younger. A link between them is provided by the existence of a copybook, which may have been passed down within the family. Drawings within it have been tentatively attributed to each of these three men. However, they each operated out of different workshops, that of the elder James being in Broadmead. In 1721 he was admitted as a burgess of Bristol, on payment of a fine of £15. James had a wife Rachel, who carried on the operation of his workshop after his death. He had a son, also called James (1748–1807), who took over the workshop from his mother in 1768 on becoming a burgess in that year.

== Works ==
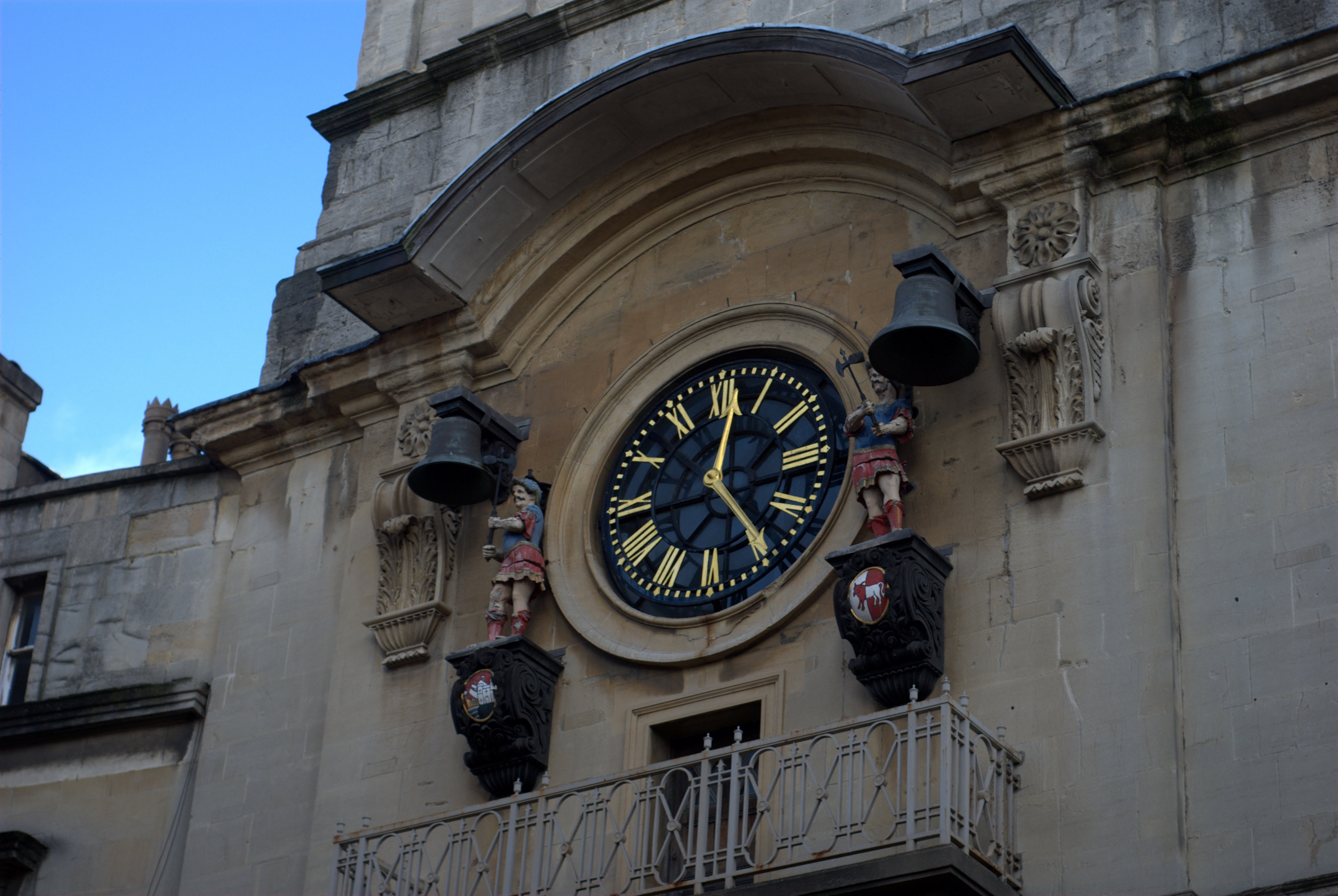
Christ Church quarter jacks.

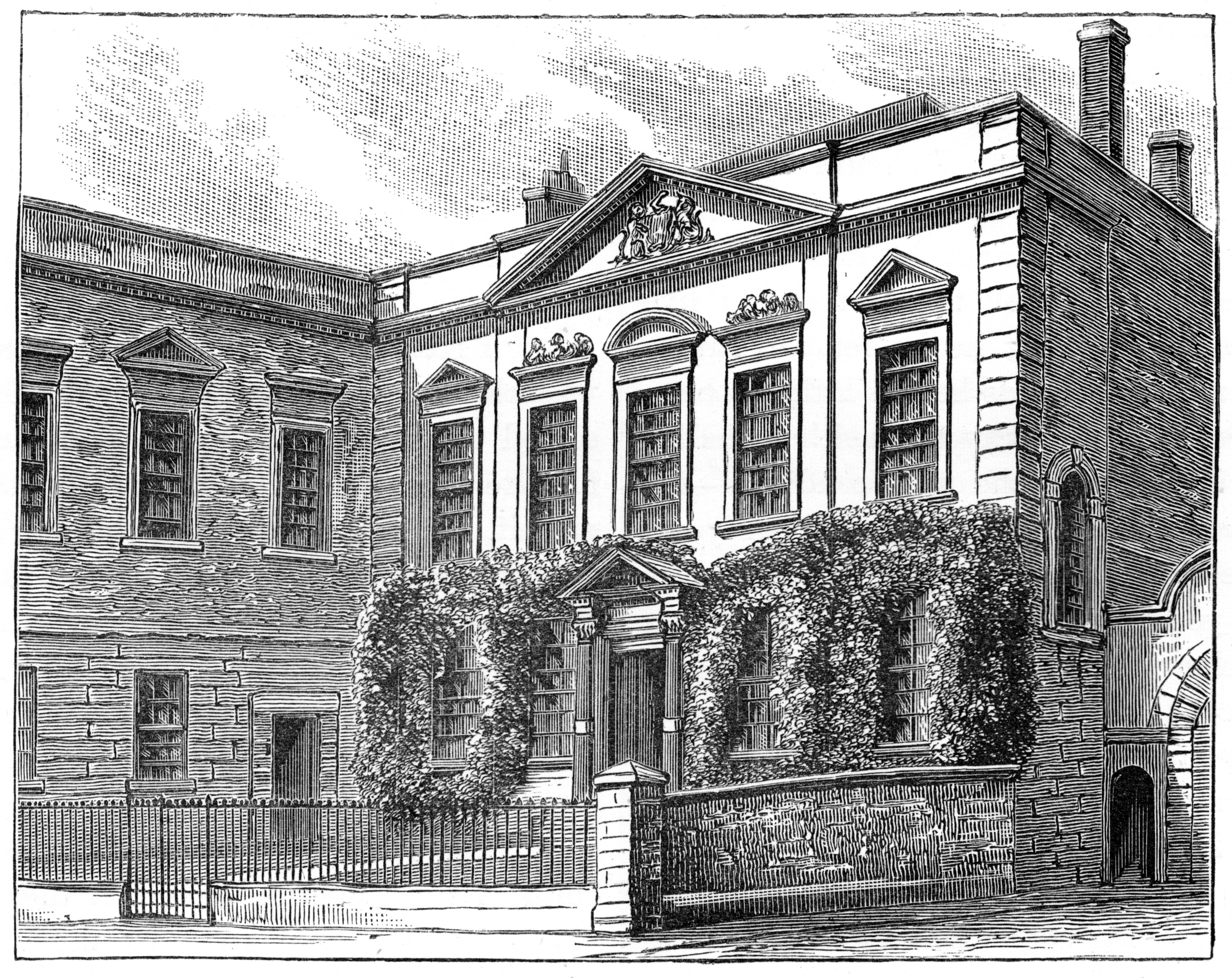
The Old Library in 1876.

James Paty the Elder carved the wooden quarter jacks for Christ Church, Bristol, which were transferred later to the tower of the new church when it was rebuilt by William Paty as Christ Church with St Ewen. He was brought in by Thomas Paty to work as a stone carver on the Exchange where he carved at least one of the capitals. There are also about a dozen monuments he is known to have carved.

Some other buildings are attributed to him, though not with certainty, as builder or architect: houses on Unity Street and College Green, and the Old Library on King Street. For the library he is known to have been at least the mason and stone carver, and is thought to have been the architect too. Unfortunately, most of the library's ornamentation has been lost over time and as a result of repairs: in particular, a fine Bristol coat of arms on the pediment and figures of putti depicted reading books above the first floor windows.

=== List of works ===
- Christ Church (1728) (as carver)
- 30 College Green (possibly) (c. 1730)
- Old Library (1738–40) (probably architect)
- The Exchange (1741–43) (as carver)
- 1 and 3–9 Unity Street (possibly) (c. 1742)
