= John Taylor (librarian) =

English writer and librarian

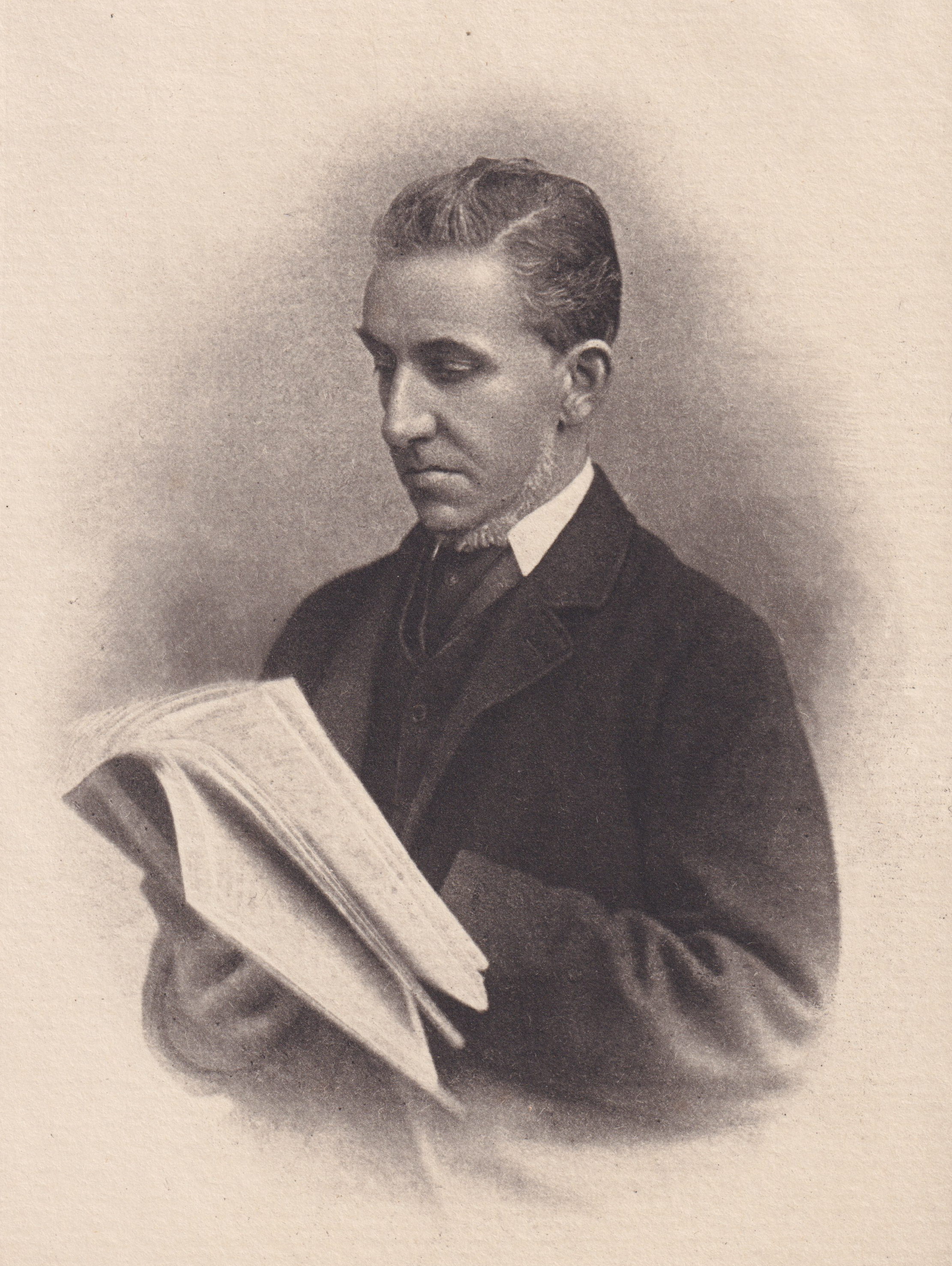
- John Taylor, Bristol City Librarian, c.1890
- Born: 12 September 1829; Clifton, Bristol
- Died: 9 April 1893 (aged 63)
- Occupation: Librarian
- Known for: Librarian, writer, antiquarian

John Taylor (1829–1893) was an English historian and librarian.

== Life ==
Taylor was born 12 September 1829 in Berkeley Place, Clifton in Bristol. He was the eldest son of the ironmonger John Taylor and Ann Ackland. After leaving school he worked for his father but wrote and studied in his spare time, including teaching himself to read Latin and Greek. That impressed the Bristol Library Society to the extent that in 1855 they proposed him as a subscriber, providing Taylor the right to borrow books from the largest public library in the west of England.

In 1858-9 the local newspaper, the Bristol Times, published a number of Taylor's translations of early religious poetry. This brought public recognition and in March 1860 Taylor was appointed as assistant librarian to the Bristol Library Society, becoming its librarian in 1863. In 1871 he was appointed librarian to Bristol Museum and Library and in 1883 he became the City Librarian of Bristol, following the death of James Fawckner Nicholls. Taylor remained city librarian until his death on 9 April 1893.

Taylor wrote or contributed to a number of publications, including essays published in the London journal, the Saturday Review. Most of his writing concerned the history and antiquities of Bristol and the West Country. He was instrumental to the foundation of the Bristol and Gloucestershire Archaeological Society in 1876, as the newly constituted Society acknowledged.

Taylor's magnum opus was the 'Ecclesiastical History' of Bristol, published in 1881 as the second volume to Bristol Past and Present. This volume was substantially Taylor's, albeit all three volumes in the series were listed under the names of Nicholls and Taylor. Taylor's volume has been described as "the most valuable part of a generally useful book".

Taylor died in 1893 (aged 64) of an 'internal complaint' that had worsened since the death of his daughter, Una, the year before. He was survived by his wife, three sons and three daughters. Taylor's eldest son, Lancelot Acland, was by this time the Librarian of the Bristol Museum and Reference Library.

The obituary provided by the Bristol and Gloucestershire Archaeological Society, claimed of John Taylor:

If it is true that a Public Librarian needs the manners of an Ambassador and the temper of a Saint, then Mr. Taylor’s quiet gentleness and unruffled patience brought him very near to the ideal of what a Librarian should be.

== Bibliography ==
- Taylor, John (1867). Tintern Abbey and its Founders. Bristol: Houlston & Wright.
- Taylor, John (1868). Guide to Clifton and its Neighbourhood (excluding Bristol). Bristol: J Wright & Co.
- Taylor, John (1872). A Book About Bristol: Historical, Ecclesiastical, and Biographical, from Original Research. London: Houlston and Sons.
- Taylor, John (1877). Bristol and Clifton Old and New. London: Houlston and Sons.
- Nicholls, J. F.; Taylor, John (1881). Bristol Past and Present, Vol I - Civil History. Bristol: Arrowsmith.
- Nicholls, J. F.; Taylor, John (1881). Bristol Past and Present, Vol II - Ecclesiastical History. Bristol: Arrowsmith.
- Nicholls, J. F.; Taylor, John (1882). Bristol Past and Present, Vol III - Civil and Modern History. Bristol: Arrowsmith.
- Taylor, John (1886). The Earliest Free Libraries of England. St. Helens: Dromgoole and Co.
- Fox, Francis F.; Taylor, John (1889). Some Account of the Guild of Bristol Weavers in Bristol: chiefly from MSS. Bristol: William George & Sons.
- Taylor, John (1890–91). "Ecclesiastical Bristol" (PDF). Transactions of the Bristol and Gloucestershire Archaeological Society. 15: 19–36.
- Taylor, John (1895). Antiquarian Essays Contributed to the "Saturday Review". Bristol: W. Crofton Hemmons.
