= Llandoger Trow =

Listed pub in Bristol, England

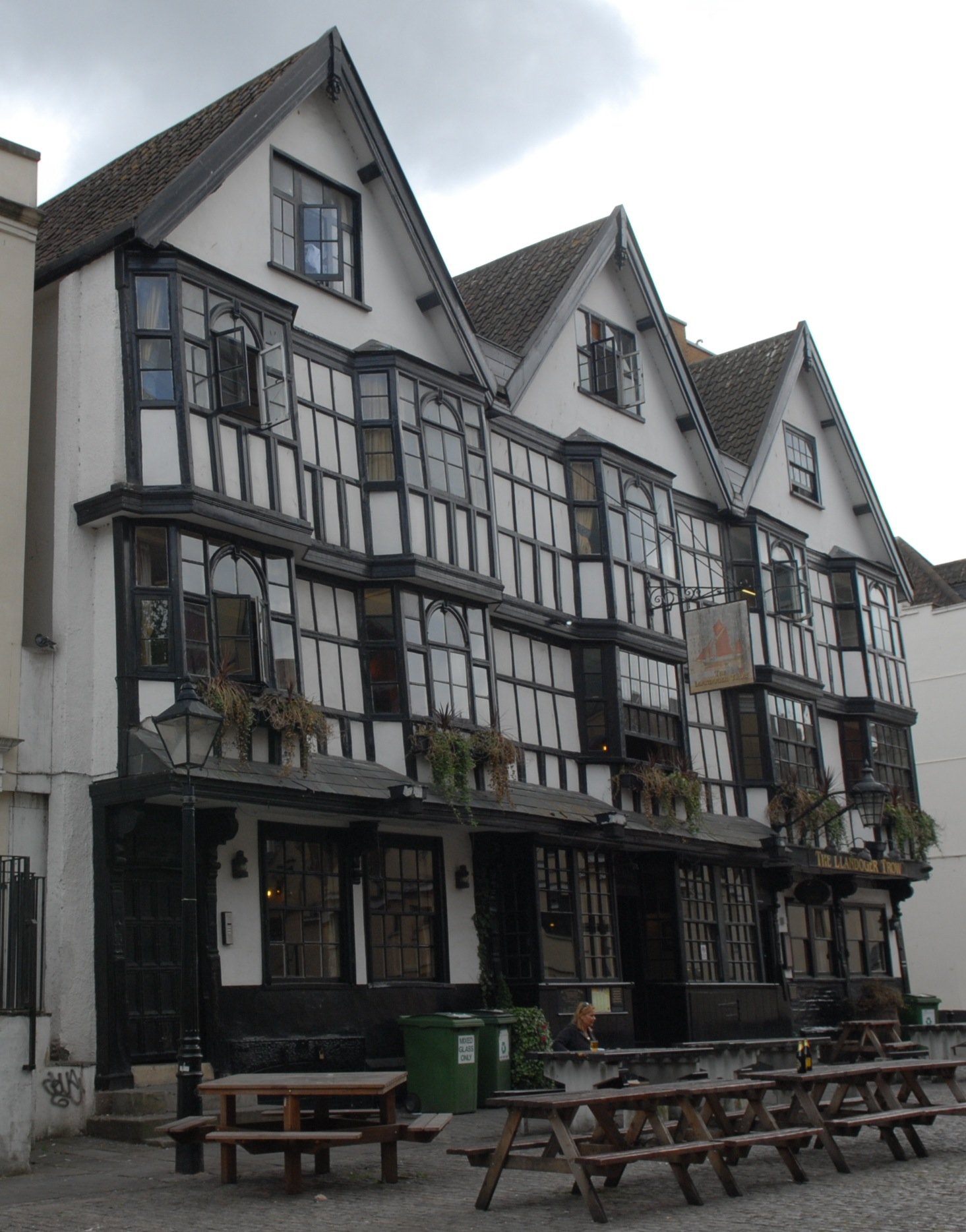
- The Llandoger Trow in 2008

- Location within Bristol

General information
- Location: King Street, Bristol, England
- Coordinates: 51.4519°N 2.5932°W
- Year built: 1664

Listed Building – Grade II*
- Official name: Llandoger Trow public house
- Designated: 8 January 1959
- Reference no.: 1202324

The Llandoger Trow is a historic public house in Bristol, England. Dating from 1664, it is on King Street, between Welsh Back and Queen Charlotte Street, near the old city centre docks. Named by a sailor who owned the pub after Llandogo in Wales which built trows (flat-bottomed river boats), the building was damaged in World War II, but remained in sufficiently good condition to be designated a Grade II* listed building in 1959. The pub is said to have inspired Robert Louis Stevenson to write of the Admiral Benbow Inn in Treasure Island and Daniel Defoe supposedly met William Dampier and Alexander Selkirk there, his inspiration for Robinson Crusoe. The pub is also supposedly haunted, with up to 15 ghosts and one little green ghoul, the best known being a child whose footsteps can be heard on the top floor.

On 20 April 2019 the pub was closed, but has now re-opened as part of the Bloomsbury Leisure group.

== History ==
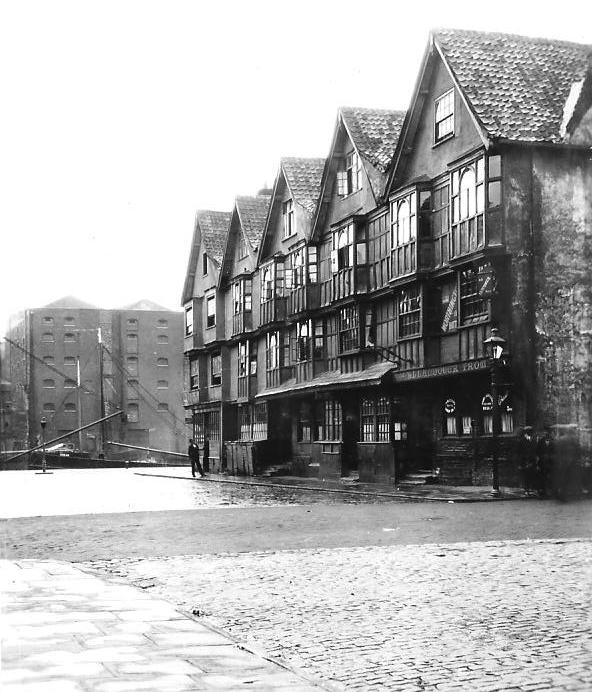
The Llandoger Trow in the early 1930s before part was bombed in World War II

The building dates from 1664, originally a row of three houses. It was built on a timber box frame, with brick stacks. The pub has an 18th-century shop front, but the main door dates from the 20th century. The pub was partially destroyed by a bomb in World War II, but three of the original five projecting gables remain. It was designated a Grade II* listed building on 8 January 1959.

Tradition has it that Daniel Defoe met William Dampier and Alexander Selkirk, his inspiration for Robinson Crusoe, here, and it was Robert Louis Stevenson's inspiration for the Admiral Benbow in Treasure Island. In the Victorian era the pub was associated with the Theatre Royal, which is across the road, and was visited by many performers and musicians including Henry Irving.

== Name ==
A trow was a flat-bottomed barge, and Llandogo is a village 20 miles (32 km) north-west of Bristol, across the Severn Estuary and upstream on the River Wye in South Wales, where trows were once built. Trows historically sailed to trade in Bristol from Llandogo. The pub was named by Captain Hawkins, a sailor who lived in Llandogo and ran the pub.

== Modern usage ==
In 1962 it became a Berni Inn, and until 2019 was operated by Whitbread and traded as a Brewers Fayre. In 2007 the Llandoger Trow was one of the three locations seen in the "Pirate's Cove" episode of Most Haunted Live!; the others were Blackbeard's houses and Redcliffe Caves. The most popular ghost story associated with the pub is that of a small child who wore leg braces and haunts the top floor, their footsteps heard at night. The programme claimed that there were at least 15 ghosts at the Llandoger Trow, and since 2009 the owners have organised ghost hunts overnight.

In 2019 Whitbread decided to close the Llandoger Trow as it did not fit their style of pubs, and it needed repairs at an estimated cost exceeding £2 million. It closed on 20 April 2019. Whitbread stated they intended to sell the building as a going concern. It was purchased by the Bloomsbury Leisure Group and reopened in 2021.

== In popular culture ==
The Longest Johns, a Bristol-based folk musical group, paid homage to the Llandoger Trow with their song "Llandoger", featured as the opening track on their album, Voyage, released on 9 February 2024. The debut performance of the song took place on the Jingle Jam charity drive livestream on 4 December 2023.

== See also ==
- Grade II* listed buildings in Bristol
