= Mauretania, Bristol =

Pub in Bristol, England

Coordinates: 51°27′12″N 2°36′6″W

Mauretania
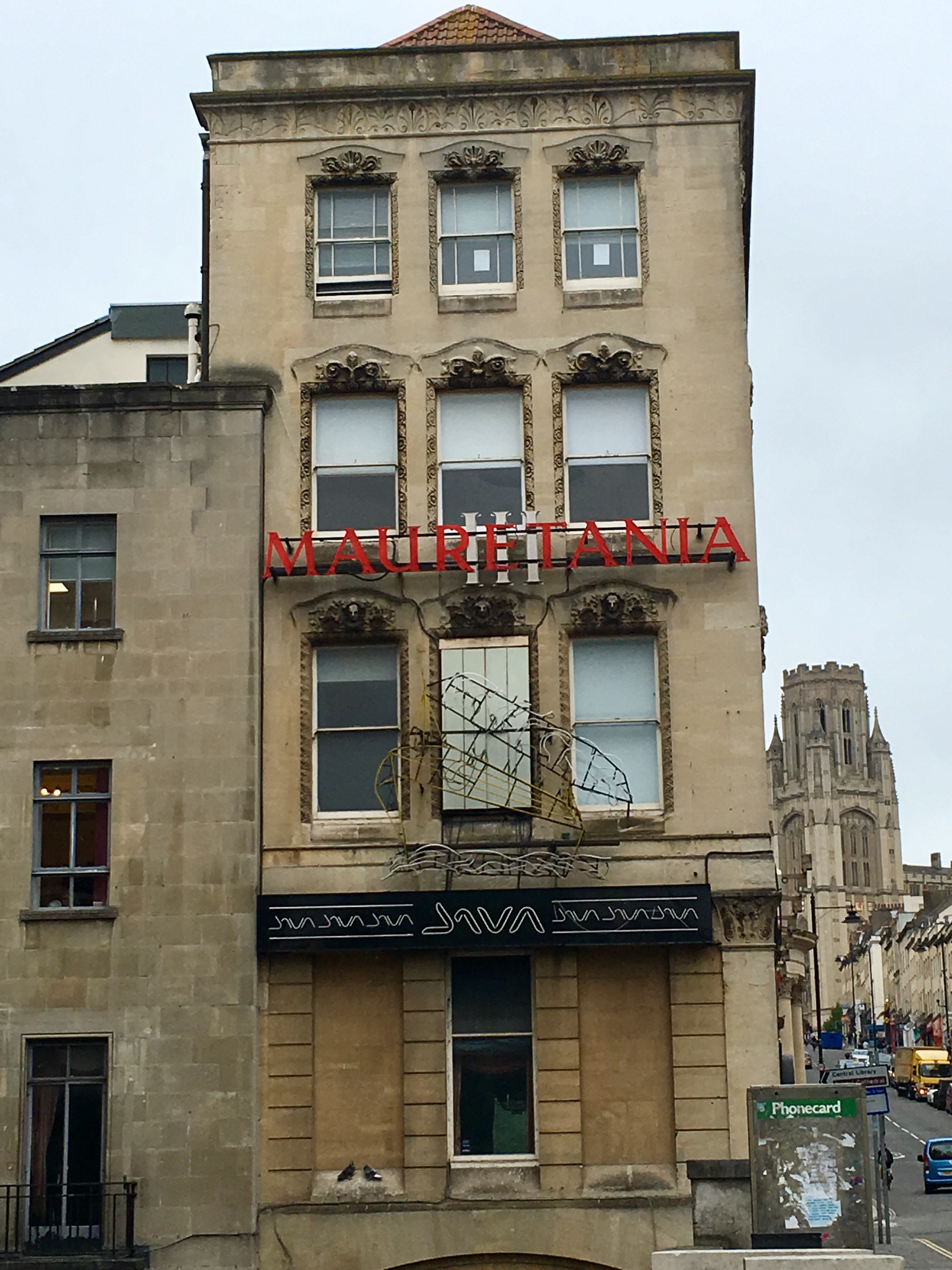
- Interactive map of the Mauretania area

General information
- Location: Bristol, England, United Kingdom
- Completed: 1870

Design and construction
- Architect: Henry Masters

The Mauretania is a pub in the English city of Bristol, built in 1870 by Henry Masters, with a rear extension being added in 1938 by WH Watkins. It has been designated by English Heritage as a grade II listed building.

Some of the furnishings from the RMS Mauretania were installed in a bar/restaurant complex at the bottom of Park Street, initially called "Mauretania", now "Java". The lounge bar was the library with mahogany panelling: above the first-class Grand Saloon with French-style gilding overlooks Frog Lane. The neon sign on the south wall still advertises the "Mauretania": installed in 1938 this was the first moving neon sign in Bristol.
