= Jacob's Well, Bristol =

Jacob's Well
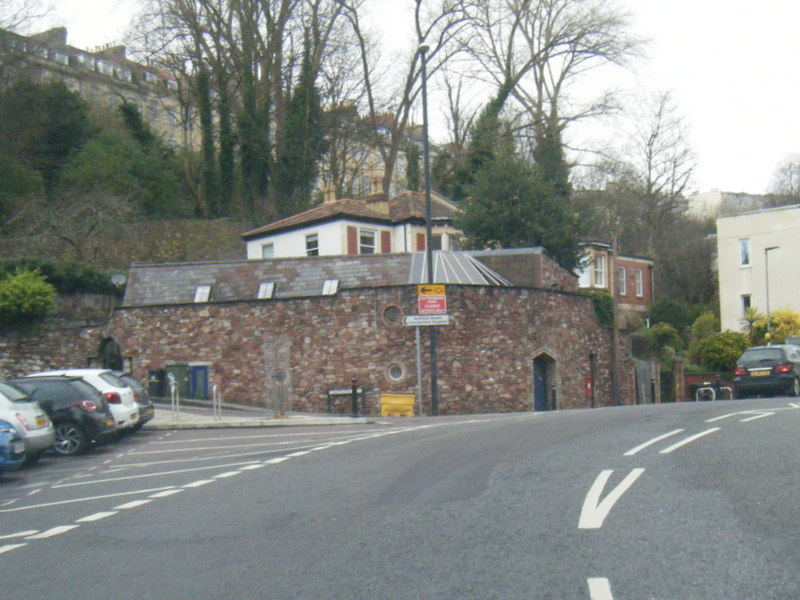
- The 19th-century building at the corner of Jacob's Wells Road and Constitution Hill within which the well lies.

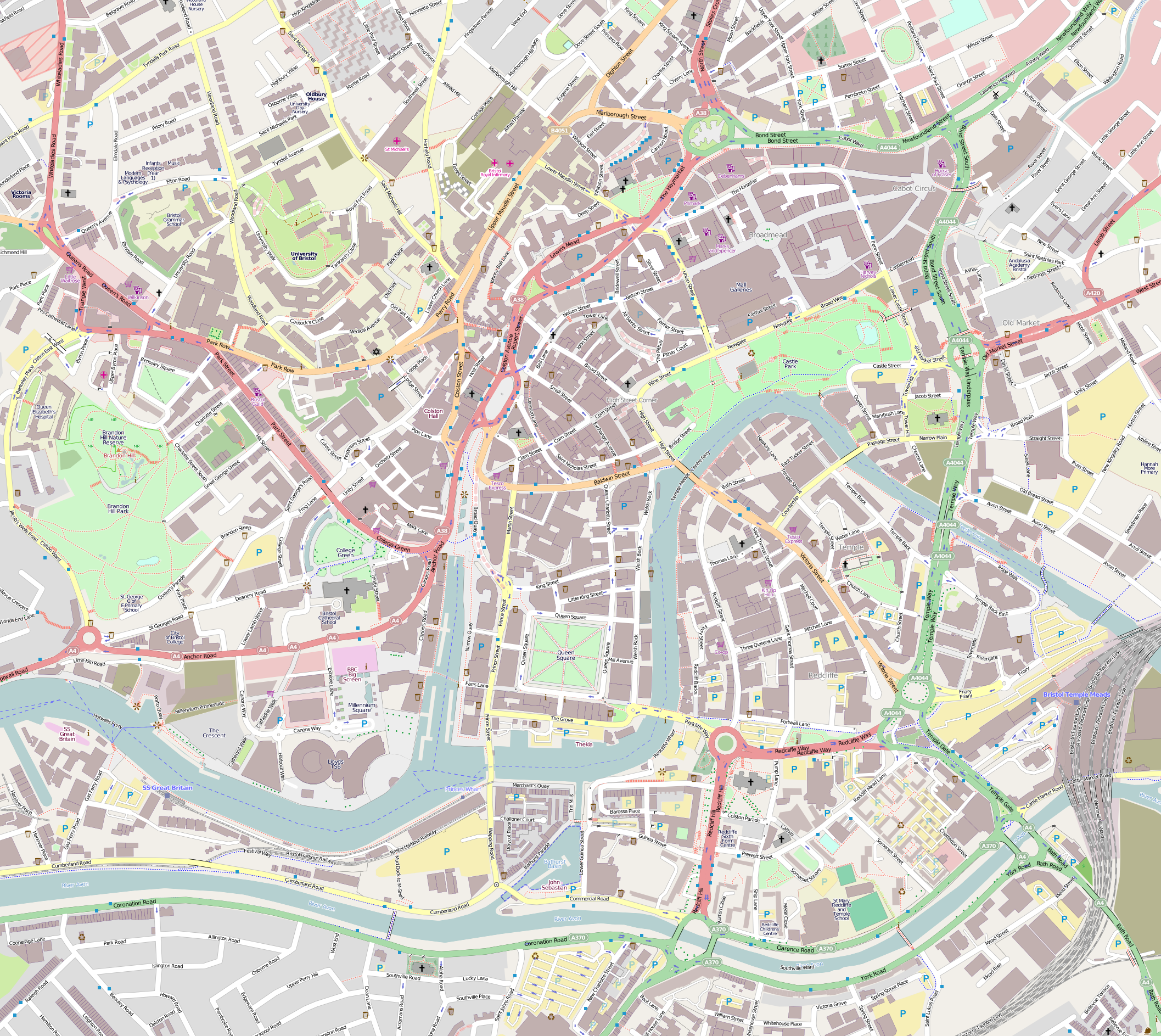
- Location within Bristol Central Location within Bristol
- 51°27′11″N 2°36′37″W
- Location: Cliftonwood, Bristol

History
- Built: 12th century CE

Scheduled monument
- Official name: Bet tohorah at Jacob's Wells Road
- Designated: 31 May 2002
- Reference no.: 1020792

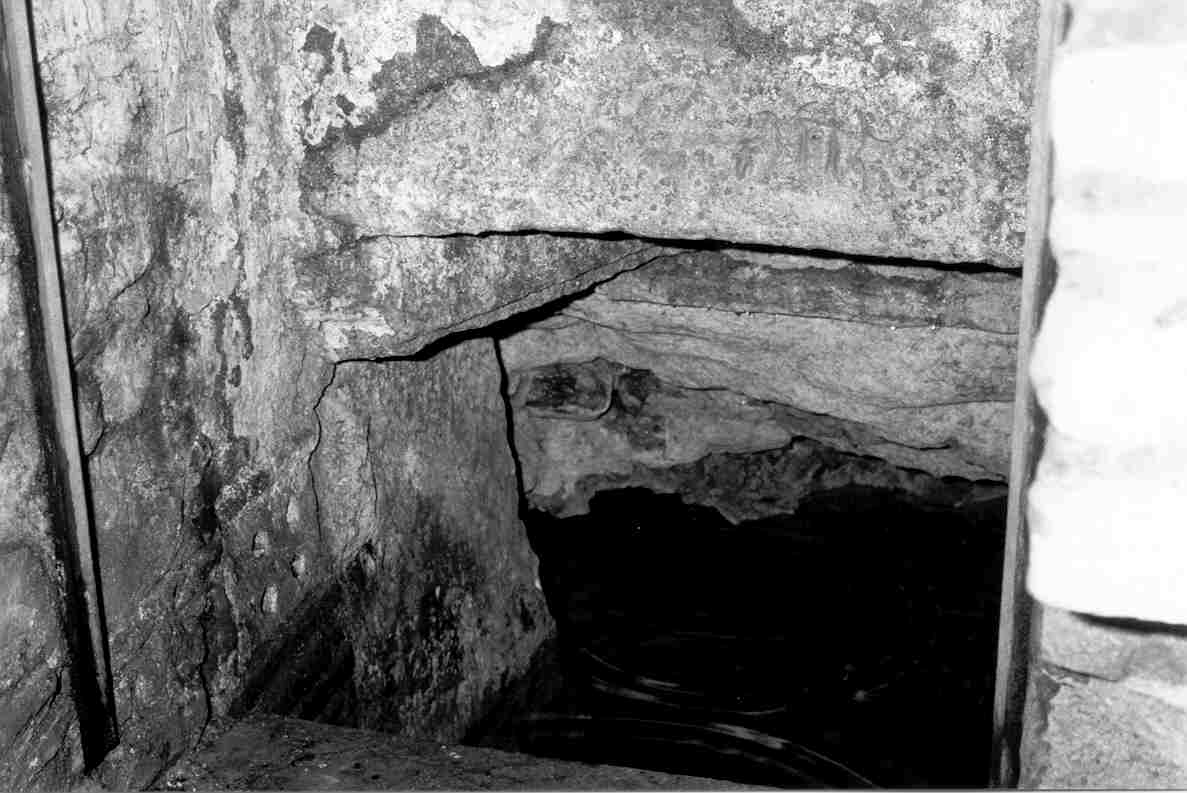
Jacob's Well entrance

Jacob's Well in Cliftonwood, Bristol, England, is an early medieval structure incorporated into a 19th-century building on the corner of Jacob's Wells Road and Constitution Hill. It is thought to be a Jewish ritual bath.

The stone structure is built round a natural spring and on a lintel there is an inscription that includes Hebrew characters. It was initially suggested that these might form part of the Hebrew word zochalim, "flowing". Following the well's rediscovery in 1987, the archaeologists involved in its survey suggested that the well might be a mikveh or Jewish ritual bath. They noted that the small chamber 'filled with clear water issuing from a fissure in the rock, at a constant 53 °F, and left from another opening feeding the presumed conduit.' The temperature reference has led some to characterise it as a 'hot spring'. However, 53 °F (12 °C), is close to average for groundwater in the UK (10 °C-11 °C).

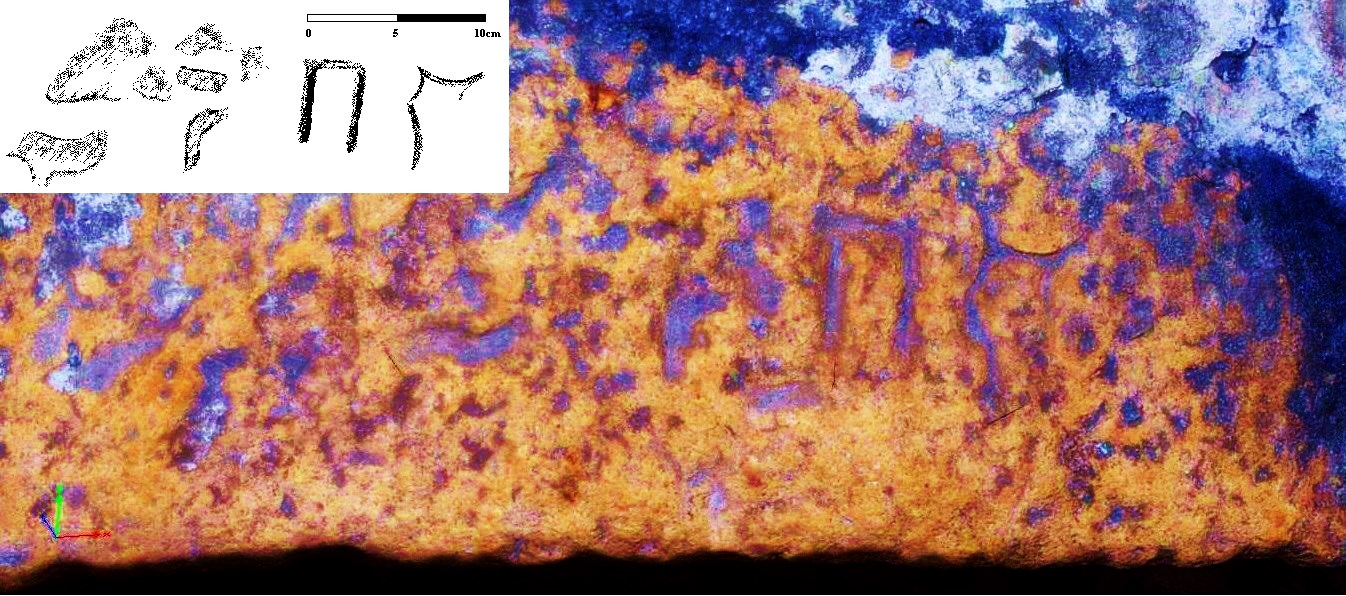
Digitally enhanced image of Jacobs Well inscription based on a 2017 archaeological 3D scan

The interpretation of the well and the inscription was challenged in 2001. The authors suggested that the well is too deep and restricted for a mikveh and too far from the medieval Jewish quarter, in the centre of the town. In the Middle Ages Jacob's Well lay in a wooded valley, on the edge of the town, about a mile from the Jewry. That was centred first around what is now Quay Street ,"Old Jewry", then later on Wine Street, close to the castle. Hillaby and Sermon suggest that the well was a bet tohorah used to cleanse bodies before burial in the nearby Jewish cemetery at Brandon Hill which was established after 1177. If so, it would be the only surviving example in England. They note that while inscription on the lintel above the well's chamber certainly includes Hebrew characters, most of the inscription is too damaged to be sure of the reading. They suggest it could be mayim chayim "living waters", which would be appropriate for waters intended for the ritual purification of a person after touching a corpse.

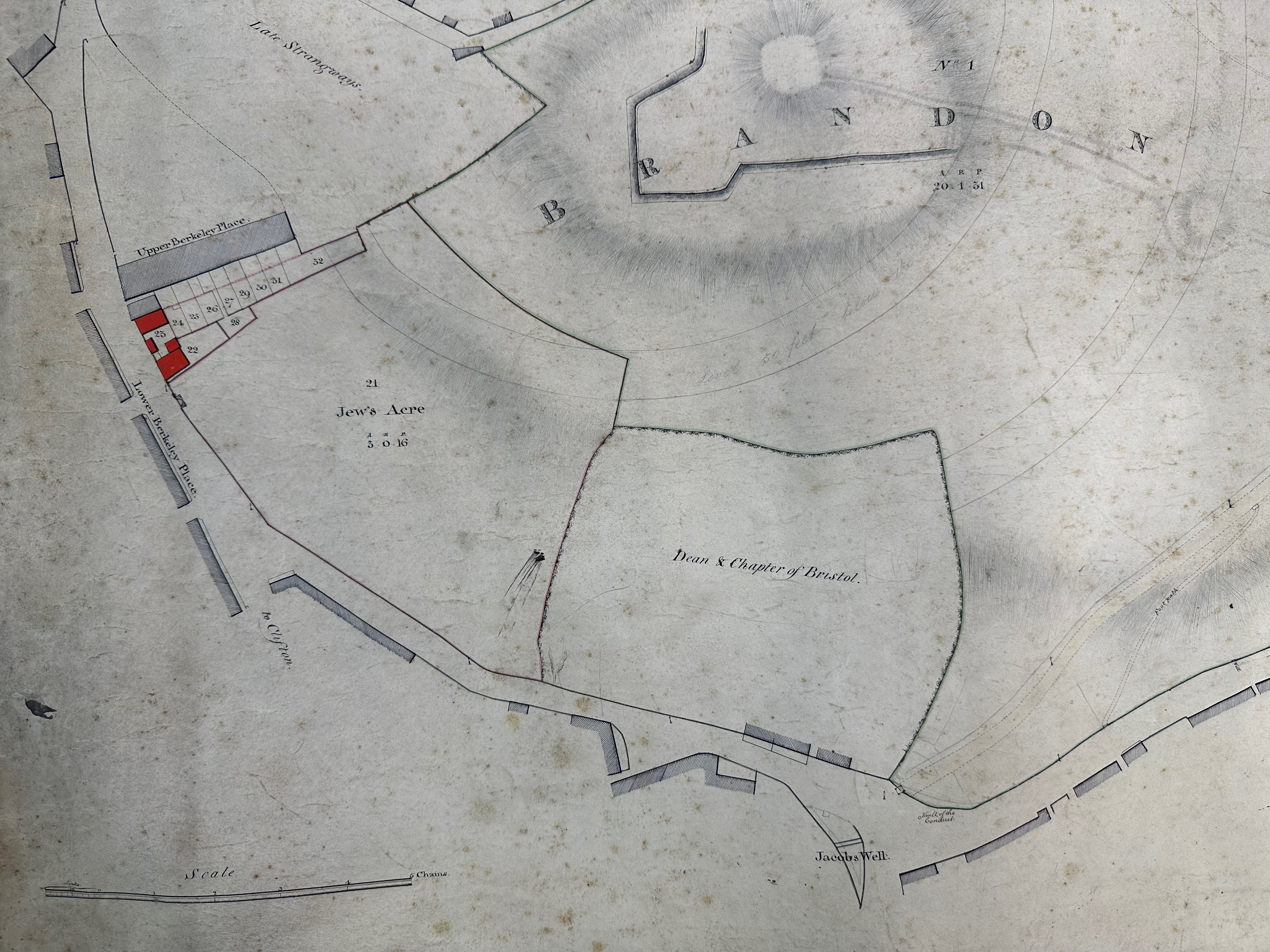
Jacob's Well and Jews Acre marked on a plan of Brandon Hill (1823)

Writing in 1861, the historian George Pryce wrote that Jacob's Well lay close by 'the “Jews Acre”, or burial ground, where now stands Queen Elizabeth's Hospital, on digging the foundation for which, a few years ago, a number of gravestones were found, with inscriptions in Hebrew characters; they were, however, thoughtlessly used in the building' The precise location of the Jews Acre (also referred to as the 'Jews Churchyard') was identified in 2007, using eighteenth and nineteenth century maps and plans of the area. The boundaries of the cemetery correspond to that of the modern school.

A Jewish community was known to exist in Bristol from at least 1154 until the wholesale banishment of the Jewish community from England in 1290.

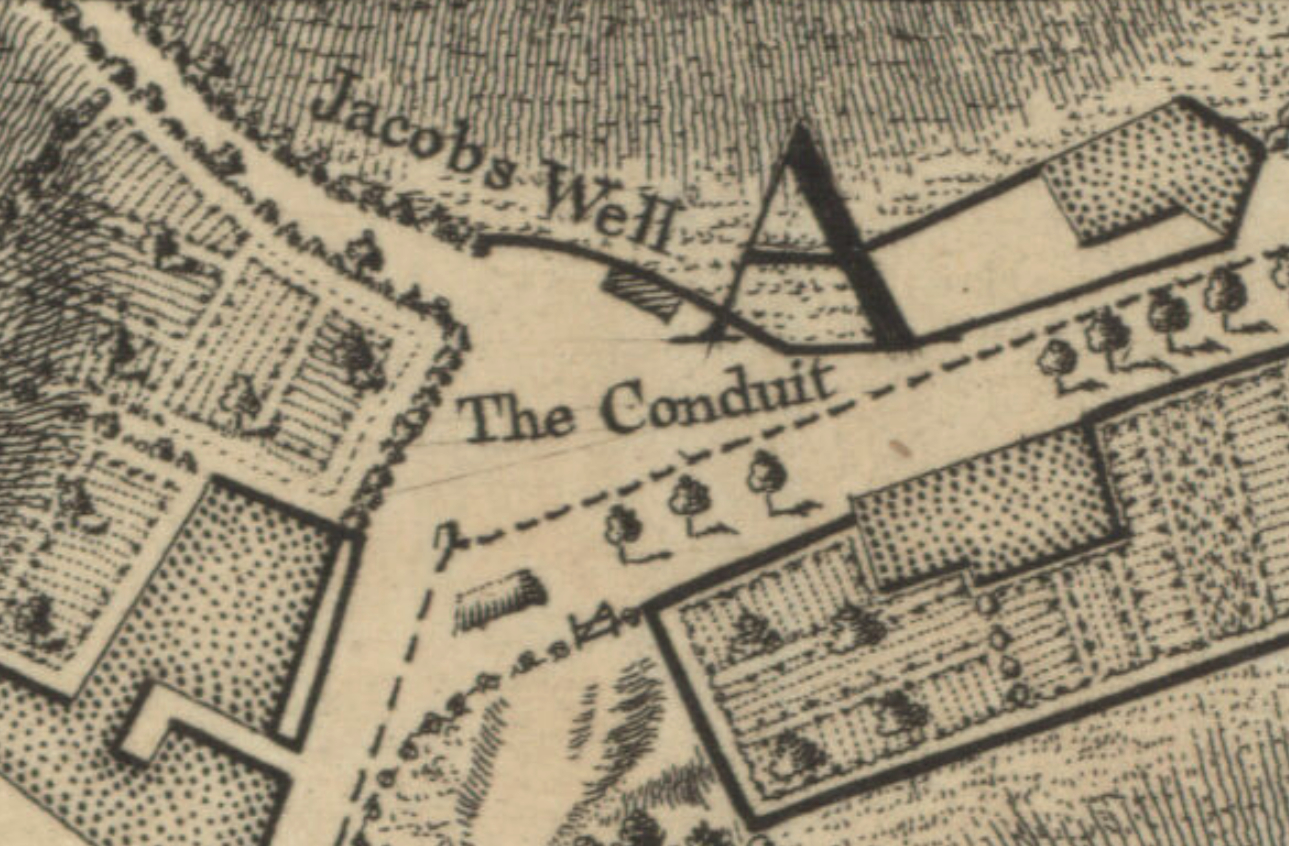
Jacob's Well and the Cathedral Conduit marked on 1743 map of Bristol. County boundary marked as a dotted line, with the shirestone also marked.

It has been claimed that the spring became the property of St Augustine's Abbey in 1142. However, there appear to have been at least two different structures at the site associated with water supply. The 1373 survey of the boundary of the new county of Bristol refers to a 'a great [boundary] stone fixed near the conduit of the Abbey of Saint Augustine of Bristol on the western part of the same conduit' The more detailed 1736 survey of the county boundary describes this stone as 'standing betwixt Jacob’s-Well and the Vault of the Conduit, which leadeth to the [Cathedral] College'. The implication is that the Abbey (later Cathedral) conduit lay just to the east of the great boundary stone, while Jacob's Well lay just to the west, putting it just outside of the county of Bristol as established in 1373. The Cathedral continued to be supplied with water from its conduit in Jacob's Well Road until the mid-19th century.

A Royal Commission on the Health of Towns reported in 1845 that nearly all of the water laid into the houses of Bristol came from Jacob's Wells. The Commission noted that the water, which also fed the Cathedral and the Grammar School, was of good quality but the volume was not enough to supply the city. Most of Bristol's water supply at this time came from the city's medieval conduits, which fed public cisterns / fountains. At some point in the later nineteenth-century the site of Jacob's Well was developed, its superstructure was demolished and the well itself was walled in at the rear of a Victorian property. In 1905 the waters from the area's springs were diverted into the Jacobs Wells Baths. Jacob's Well was rediscovered in 1987 by the Bristol Temple Local History Group, who were investigating the site during the rebuilding of a furniture workshop which had been the Hotwells Police Station bicycle shed, and a one-time fire engine house.

In February 2011, the company that now owns the well applied to the Environment Agency to extract and bottle up to 15 million litres (3.3 million imperial gallons) of water a year. Water from the well was previously bottled and sold in the 1980s.

== See also ==
For other similarly named structures, see Jacob's Well.

== References and sources ==
Sources

- J. H. Bettey, Bristol Observed, Visitors' Impressions of the City from Domesday to The Blitz (Redcliffe Press, Bristol, 1986) ISBN 0-905459-65-2.
- J. Hillaby and R. Sermon, 'Jacob's Well, Bristol: Mikveh or Bet Tohorah?', Transactions of the Bristol and Gloucestershire Archaeological Society 122 (2004) 127–152
- I. Blair, J. Hillaby, I. Howell, R. Sermon and B. Watson, 'The discovery of two medieval mikva'ot in London and a reinterpretation of the Bristol "mikveh"', Jewish Historical Studies (Jewish Historical Society of England) 37 (2001) 15-40
- Joe Hillaby, 'The Bristol Jewry to 1290' in Madge Dresser and Peter Fleming (eds.), Bristol: Ethnic Minorities and the City, 1000-2001 (Chichester : Phillimore, 2007), pp. 9–32
- Joe Hillaby and Richard Sermon, 'Jacob's Well, Bristol: Further Research', Bristol and Avon Archaeology, 22 (2007), 97-106
- R. R. Emanuel and M. W. Ponsford, 'Jacob's Well, Bristol, Britain's only known medieval Jewish Ritual Bath (Mikveh)', Transactions of the Bristol & Gloucestershire Archaeological Society, CXII (1994), 73-86
- J. Lea-Jones. Historical account of the area known as Jacob’s Wells, Clifton, Bristol, England: from twelfth century to modern times (1999) ISBN 0-9510068-9-4
- S. Watson, Secret underground Bristol (Bristol 1991) ISBN 0-907145-01-9
