= Lucy de Newchurch =

English Anchoress

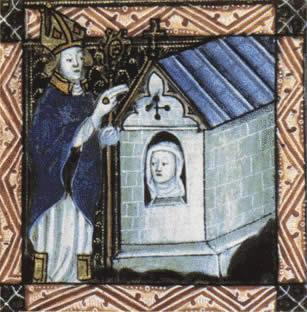
- An early 15th century depiction of a bishop blessing an anchoress.

Anchoress, hermit
- Born: Newchurch, diocese of Hereford
- Residence: Brandon Hill, Bristol, England

Lucy de Newchurch (Latin: Lucia de New Chirche) was an anchoress from the diocese of Hereford who lived in a chapel dedicated to St. Brendan on Brandon Hill in Bristol and who later became of interest to antiquarians, historians of Bristol, and writers of Bristol guide books. She was the first known of four hermits who lived on Brandon Hill at various times between 1314 and 1480.

== Life ==
Little is known about Lucy's life except that she was from Herefordshire and was the first known of a series of hermits who inhabited a cell on Brandon Hill, Bristol, in a chapel owned by St. James Priory.

In November 1349, two years before she entered her cell at the hermitage, Lucy obtained an indult from the pope allowing her to "choose a confessor who should give her plenary remission at the hour of death." At this time, she was living in the diocese of Hereford, as opposed to the diocese of Worcester where Brandon Hill was then located.

After obtaining the papal indult, Lucy petitioned the bishop of Worcester, John of Thoresby, multiple times, to allow her to take up residence as an anchoress in the hermitage and chapel of St. Brendan. The bishop wrote that Lucy had approached him "with earnest and humble devotion, as was clear to us from her appearance and demeanour, asking to be enclosed in the hermitage of St. Brandan at Bristol in our diocese."

William Barrett, the historian of Bristol, concluded that Lucy's request had been granted after "due inquiry into her conduct and purity of life and possession of the necessary virtues." This view was supported by the antiquarian Rotha Mary Clay, who described the bishop as being "impressed by Lucy's earnestness" and who identified Lucy as probably the same individual described in a deed from 1351 as an anchoress who held land on Brandon Hill. The ritual of enclosure and Lucy's blessing may have been carried out by John de Severle, the archdeacon of Worcester, or a "deputy" of his choosing, as the bishop had written to him, bestowing the power to perform it.

In the 15th century, the antiquarian William Worcester described the chapel that had contained Lucy's hermitage as being 8 and a half yards long and 5 yards wide and "like in form to Mount Calvary by Jerusalem." Worcester also claimed it was the highest structure in Bristol, having been erected on a hill that "sailors and knowledgeable men say, to be higher than any pinnacle, whether of Redcliffe Church or of other churches."

== Later references to Lucy ==
Various Bristol histories and guide books of the 19th and early 20th centuries have included ironic references to Lucy and have speculated about her desire to become an anchoress, attributing it to a "satiety" or "disappointment with the world." One guide book written "for strangers" on the "curiosities of Bristol" described Lucy as the first of a series of hermits who had "wasted their lives [in the hermitage], down to the days of the Reformation."

In 1885, a poem appeared in the antiquarian James Fawckner Nicholls' guide book How To See Bristol mocking Lucy's decision to enclose herself in a cell rather than engage in domestic work, child care, or moral reform efforts. The poem, which follows a description of Brandon Hill, reads as follows:

Lucy de Newchurch here sat in her cell
A patching her soul, and stopping each hole
That the world or the devil could enter. 'Twas well
For a woman that knew no better.
But she'd dout the sun with a half-penny squirt,
Or mop up the sea with the tail of her skirt,
Convince all maids that 'twas wicked to marry,
Before she could outmanoeuvre Old Harry,
Or before he alone would let her.
Had she handled a broom in some humble room,
Or crooned babe's "Babel" while rocking her cradle,
Or scalded her hand with the iron ladle
Whilst giving soup to some hungry group;
Or sopped a crust for some toothless gum,
Or kissed the blood from a child's cut thumb,
Or said to some fallen sister, 'O come!
This way of life abandon!'
She'd have been much nearer to kingdom come,
Than here by herself on Brandon.

== Excavations on Brandon Hill ==
In 1897, Dr. Alfred C. Fryer, a member of the Clifton Antiquarian Club, published a paper in the Journal of the British Archaeological Association on the discovery of buried walls, bones, and a "well-made," east–west–oriented grave during excavations for the foundations of Cabot Tower. According to James R. Bramble, the president of the club, Dr. Fryer believed the "walls found several feet below the surface of the summit of the hill to have been remains of a 'crypt belonging to the Chapel of St. Brandon,' and that the skeletons were those of 'some of the poor hermits who once occupied the hermitage.'" Alfred Hudd, the club's secretary, who visited the site, believed the walls were more likely to be those of the hermitage chapel itself rather than a crypt.

Historic England has described the findings as follows:

The remains comprised stone-built walls with some internal plaster and fragments of green glaze tile, as well as floors of beaten earth or thin cement. Underneath this flooring were three inhumation burials, as well as a stone lined cist lying east-west. It is believed this chapel is one that in 1193 Henry, Bishop of Worcester, confirmed to St James' Priory. There was also a hermitage here, with Lucy de Newchirche as the first recorded occupant in 1351.

== See also ==
- Anchorite
- Brandon Hill, Bristol
- History of Bristol
