= Cabot, Bristol =

Former electoral ward in Bristol, England

Coordinates: 51.468°N 2.613°W

Cabot
- Former ward Bristol City Council
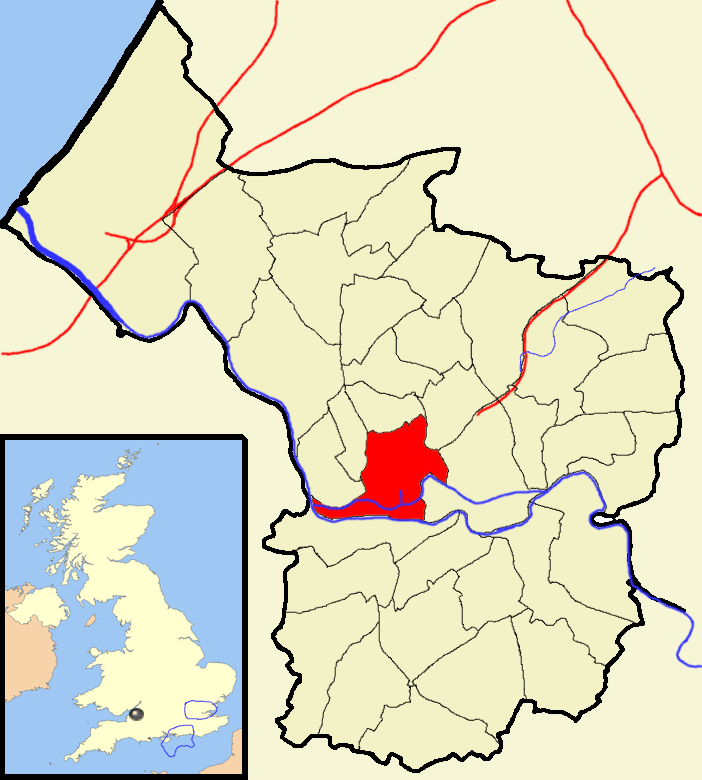
- Ward boundaries
- County: Bristol
- Population: 15,940 (2011)

1980–2016
- UK Parliament constituency: Bristol West

Cabot was an electoral ward that covered the centre of Bristol, England. It was represented by two members on Bristol City Council.

Cabot ward was created in 1980, and ceased to exist as a ward in 2016, its area being allocated to Hotwells and Harbourside ward and Central ward following boundary changes.

Cabot ward took its name from the Cabot Tower, a memorial tower on Brandon Hill that was built to commemorate John Cabot's voyage and "discovery" of North America.

== Area profile ==
Cabot ward contained much of Bristol city centre, including Broadmead, Brandon Hill, Canon's Marsh, College Green, Park Street, Queen Square and Spike Island. It also contained parts of Kingsdown, Redcliffe, Stokes Croft and Tyndall's Park. The whole of the medieval city and many of Bristol's oldest surviving buildings were in the ward. It included much of Bristol Harbour, the main campus of the University of Bristol, 17 churches, a cathedral, a synagogue, four museums, three hospitals, two theatres, two concert halls, and art galleries and cinemas.

In the 2001 census Cabot ward had a resident population of 9,604. The population is generally young, student/professional and in rented accommodation. The ward was in the Parliamentary constituency of Bristol West and had two councillors. As of 2009-10, Cabot had the highest crime rate per resident of any ward in the city, with more than double the offences per head of any other ward.

== Electoral history ==
=== 2015 election ===
Bristol City Council Elections: Cabot Ward 2015
Party	Candidate	Votes	%	±%
Green	Ani Stafford-Townsend	2916	38.47	+18.21
Labour	Kye Dudd	1692	22.32	−3.47
Liberal Democrats	Alexander William Woodman	1527	20.15	−20.46
Conservative	Will Luangrath	1352	17.84	+4.49
TUSC	Chris Farrell	93	1.23	N/A
Majority		1224	16.15	+1.33
Green gain from Liberal Democrats		Swing	+10.84	

=== 2013 election ===
Bristol City Council Elections: Cabot Ward 2013
Party	Candidate	Votes	%	±%
Liberal Democrats	Mark Michael Wright	852	40.61	+3.16
Labour	Simon Firth	541	25.79	+1.47
Green	Charlie Bolton	425	20.26	+1.06
Conservative	Chris Didcote	280	13.35	−3.46
Majority		311	14.82	+1.69
Liberal Democrats hold		Swing	+0.85	
