= Jacobs Well =

Jacobs Well, Jacob's Well, or Jacobswell may refer to:

== Structures ==
- Jacob's Well, or the Well of Sychar, a well mentioned in the New Testament and located in the West Bank
- Jacob's Well, Bristol, an early mediaeval structure in England that is thought to be a Jewish ritual bath
- Jacobs Well, York, a historic building in York, in England
- Jacob's Well, a well on the grounds of The Cross (Barre, Massachusetts)

== Settlements ==
- Jacobs Well, Queensland, a suburb in City of Gold Coast, South-East Queensland, Australia
- Jacobs Well, Surrey, a village near Guildford, also called "Jacobswell"

== Natural features ==
- Jacob's Well (Texas), a sinkhole and karstic spring located near Wimberley, Texas

== Other ==
- Jacob's Well (sermon collection), 15th-century Middle English text
