= Hotwells and Harbourside =

Electoral ward in Bristol, England

Coordinates: 51°27′04″N 2°36′11″W

- ward Bristol City Council
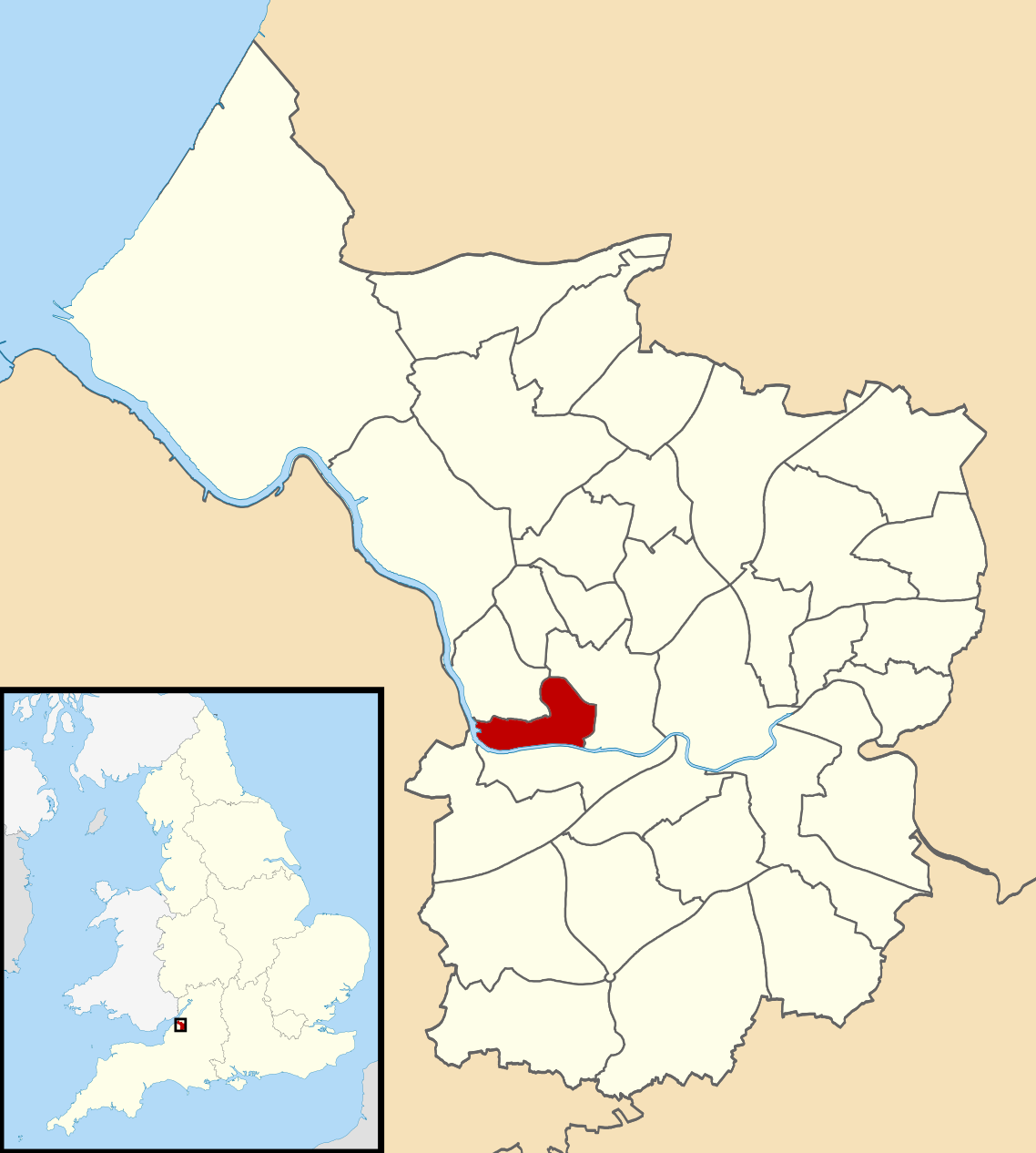
- Ward boundaries since 2016.
- County: Bristol
- Population: 6,035
- Electorate: 3,869

Current ward
- Created: 2016
- Councillor: Patrick McAllister (Green)
- Created from: Cabot
- UK Parliament constituency: Bristol Central

Hotwells and Harbourside is one of the thirty-four electoral wards in the city of Bristol in the southwest of England. It is represented by one councillor on Bristol City Council, which as of 2024 is Patrick McAllister of the Green Party of England and Wales. Hotwells and Harbourside ward was created in May 2016 following a boundary review, incorporating part of the former Cabot ward.

== Area profile ==
The ward covers part of Bristol city centre (between Jacob's Wells Road and Park Street), Spike Island, and parts of Hotwells and Cliftonwood. Notable places in the ward include College Green, Bristol Cathedral, Bristol City Hall, Brandon Hill, Cabot Tower, and the Cumberland Basin.

Hotwells and Harbourside has a large number of young people living in the area. As of 2020, over 25% of the population was aged 16–24, significantly higher than the national average. People aged 25–39 also make a substantial part of the population, at over 35%.

For elections to the Parliament of the United Kingdom, Hotwells and Harbourside is part of Bristol Central constituency. Before boundary changes in 2024, it was in Bristol West constituency.

== Council elections ==
Since the ward's formation in 2016, it was held by the Liberal Democrats until 2023. A by-election due to councillor ill-health took place on 2 February 2023, won by the Green Party candidate, which consequently became the largest party on Bristol City Council.

=== 2024 election ===
Hotwells & Harbourside (1 seat)
Party	Candidate	Votes	%	±%
Green	Patrick McAllister*	974	63.33	+31.75
Labour	Alex Bullett	336	21.85	−3.22
Liberal Democrats	Thomas Grunshaw	109	7.09	−25.81
Conservative	Caroline Lucas	86	5.59	−3.60
TUSC	Daniel Evans	26	1.69	+1.69
Turnout		1,538	39.75	−5.87
Green hold		Swing		

=== 2023 by-election ===
Hotwells & Harbourside (1 seat)
Party	Candidate	Votes	%	±%
Green	Patrick McAllister	537	42.96	
Liberal Democrats	Stephen Williams	511	40.88	
Labour	Beryl Eileen Means	153	12.24	
Conservative	Eliana Barbosa	34	2.72	
Independent	Martin Booth	14	1.12	
Turnout		1,250	32.38	
Green gain from Liberal Democrats		Swing		

Independent candidate Martin Booth announced on 16 January that he would not campaign, effectively withdrawing, due to a perceived conflict of interest with his role as Bristol24-7 editor. However he remained on the ballot paper. The Conservative Eliana Barbosa was a "paper candidate", who did not attend the hustings or count.

=== 2021 election ===
Hotwells & Harbourside (1 seat)
Party	Candidate	Votes	%	±%
Liberal Democrats	Alex Hartley	651	32.91	
Green	Heulwen Flower	625	31.60	
Labour	Henry Palmer	496	25.08	
Conservative	Julian Ellacott	182	9.20	
Turnout		1,978	45.39	
Liberal Democrats hold		Swing		

=== 2016 election ===
Hotwells & Harbourside (1 seat), 2016
Party	Candidate	Votes	%	±%
Liberal Democrats	Mark Wright	609	33.67	
Green	Chris Millman	441	24.38	
Labour	Ted Fowler	400	22.11	
Conservative	Iain Jenkins Dennis	284	15.70	
Independent	Tim Collins	47	2.60	
TUSC	Ian Christopher Quick	28	1.55	
Turnout		1,826	46.40	
