= Central (Bristol ward) =

Electoral ward in Bristol, England

Coordinates: 51.453632°N 2.591341°W

- ward Bristol City Council
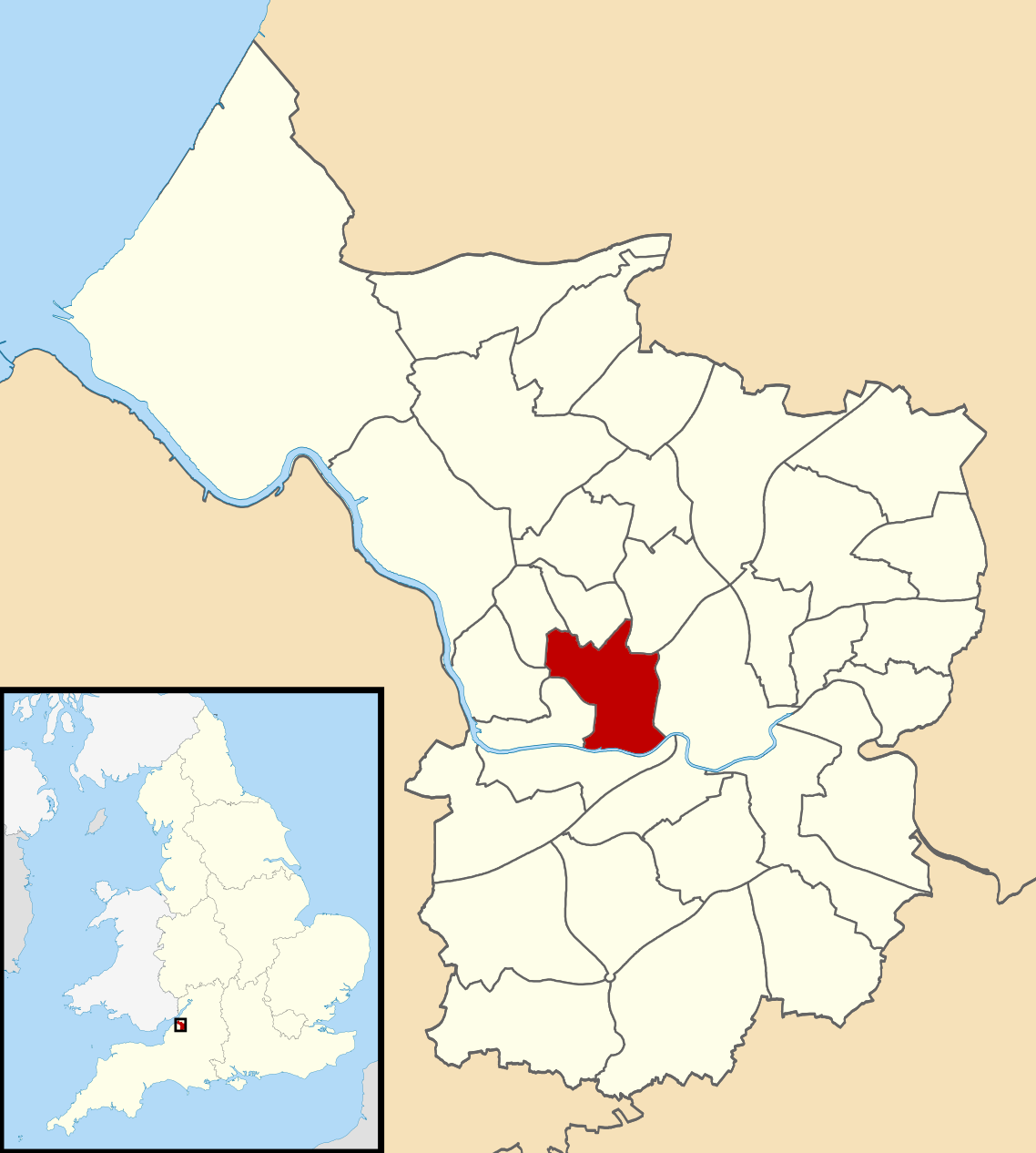
- Ward boundaries since 2016.
- County: Bristol
- Population: 18,390
- Electorate: 8,958

Current ward
- Created: 2016
- Councillor: Ani Stafford-Townsend (Green)
- Councillor: Sibusiso Tshabalala (Green)
- Created from: Cabot
- UK Parliament constituency: Bristol Central

Central is an electoral ward in Bristol, England, covering Bristol city centre. The ward is represented by two members on Bristol City Council, which as of 2024 are Ani Stafford-Townsend and Sibusiso Tshabalala of the Green Party of England and Wales.

The ward was created ahead of the 2016 United Kingdom local elections, following a boundary review by the Local Government Boundary Commission for England. It includes part of the former Cabot ward.

== Area profile ==
Central ward covers much of the city centre, including Broadmead, Redcliffe, and Queen Square, an area bound by the New Cut river to the south and the inner circuit road to the east. To the north, it extends to include the western side of Stokes Croft and the Dove Street housing estate. It also extends into the west end, to include an area bound by Park Street to the south, Whiteladies Road to the west, and Kingsdown to the south. It therefore includes Bristol Royal Infirmary, Bristol Children's Hospital, and the core of the University of Bristol campus. Other areas which some might consider to be part of Bristol city centre are not in Central ward, such as Temple Quay and Bristol Temple Meads railway station, which are in Lawrence Hill ward; and College Green and Canon's Marsh, which are in Hotwells and Harbourside ward.

The ward includes much of the city's central business district, with several large and many small employers. It therefore supports around 112,000 jobs, far higher than any other ward in the city. Central ward also records the highest crime rate in Bristol, with 476.6 crimes per 1,000 resident population in 2022-23 (compared to a Bristol average of 113.8).

Central ward had a resident population of 18,390 in the 2021 United Kingdom census. Of these, 37.6% were born outside the UK, significantly higher than the 18.8% Bristol average. Nearly half (49.4%) of residents were aged 16 to 24 years, and 29.2% lived in a communal establishment, reflecting the large number of student halls of residence in the ward.

With a high density urban form, 93.2% of homes are apartments, significantly higher than the 35.2% Bristol average. 43.7% are one person households, and 18.9% are multiple-family households. At 21%, home ownership is significantly lower than the 54.8% Bristol average, and private renting is significantly higher (58.3% vs 26.4% average).

Just 10.4% of households have dependant children, significantly below the 26.7% Bristol average. Of those children, a high percentage live in low income families (39.8%, compared to 21.8% Bristol average), with a high proportion known to social services (4.6%, compared to 2.4% Bristol average).

Life expectancy for residents of Central Ward is 74.1 years, statistically significantly lower than Bristol average of 77.8 years, and the ward has the highest rate of premature mortality in the city.

At the 2021 census, 57.3% of households in Central ward did not have a car, the highest rate in Bristol.

On measures of deprivation, there is large variation between areas within the ward, with pockets of very high measures of deprivation. Redcliffe South and Stokes Croft West, both areas with high-rise council housing, are in the most deprived decile of areas in England. By contrast, Woodland Road and University in the west of the ward rank lower than average on measures of deprevation.

For elections to the Parliament of the United Kingdom, Central is in Bristol Central constituency. Before the 2024 boundary changes, it was in Bristol West constituency.

== Local elections ==
=== 2024 election ===
Central (2 seats)
Party	Candidate	Votes	%	±%
Green	Ani Stafford-Townsend*	1,407	51.33	+11.20
Green	Sibusiso Tshabalala	1,242	45.31	+15.27
Labour	Sarah Chaffer-Swingler	1,093	39.88	+7.00
Labour	Matt Redmore	944	34.44	+1.99
Conservative	Julian Elacott	157	5.73	−6.87
Conservative	Tony Lee	152	5.55	−5.43
Liberal Democrats	Adam Harvey	117	4.27	−7.11
Liberal Democrats	Henry Windle	85	3.10	−6.05
TUSC	Nick Clare	78	2.85	+2.85
Turnout		2,741	30.60	+1.08
Green gain from Labour				
Green hold				

=== 2021 election ===
The 2021 election was notable for the defeat of Kye Dudd, who had been cabinet member for transport on the council, as part of a city-wide swing to the Green Party.

Central (2 seats)
Party	Candidate	Votes	%	±%
Green	Ani Stafford-Townsend	1,316	40.13	+7.78
Labour	Farah Hussain	1,078	32.88	−7.45
Labour	Kye Daniel Dudd	1,064	32.45	−0.17
Green	Simon Ingham Stafford-Townsend	985	30.04	+5.65
Conservative	Richard Leslie Clifton	413	12.60	−1.23
Liberal Democrats	Jen Smith	373	11.38	−2.60
Conservative	David John Kibble	360	10.98	−1.24
Liberal Democrats	Zac Barker	300	9.15	−3.45
Turnout		3,279	29.52	−5.98
Green gain from Labour				
Labour hold				

=== 2016 election ===
Central (2 seats)
Party	Candidate	Votes	%	±%
Labour	Kye Dudd	1,051	40.38	
Labour	Paul Smith	849	32.62	
Green	Ani Stafford-Townsend	842	32.35	
Green	Rob Telford	635	24.39	
Liberal Democrats	Pauline Allen	364	13.98	
Conservative	Suzi Best	360	13.83	
Liberal Democrats	Sylvia Doubell	328	12.60	
Conservative	Ann Pulteney	318	12.22	
Turnout		2,603	35.50	
Labour win (new seat)				
Labour win (new seat)				
