= Old Elizabethans =

Old Elizabethans may refer to:

- The former name of the alumni of the Royal Grammar School Worcester. They are now called the Worcester "Alice Ottlians and Old Elizabethans".
- Alumni of Elizabeth College, Guernsey, see Category:People educated at Elizabeth College, Guernsey
- Alumni of Queen Elizabeth's Hospital, Bristol, see Category:People educated at Queen Elizabeth's Hospital, Bristol
