= Jews Acre, Bristol =

Jewish burial ground in Bristol, England

Jews Acre: site of QEH school, built 1847
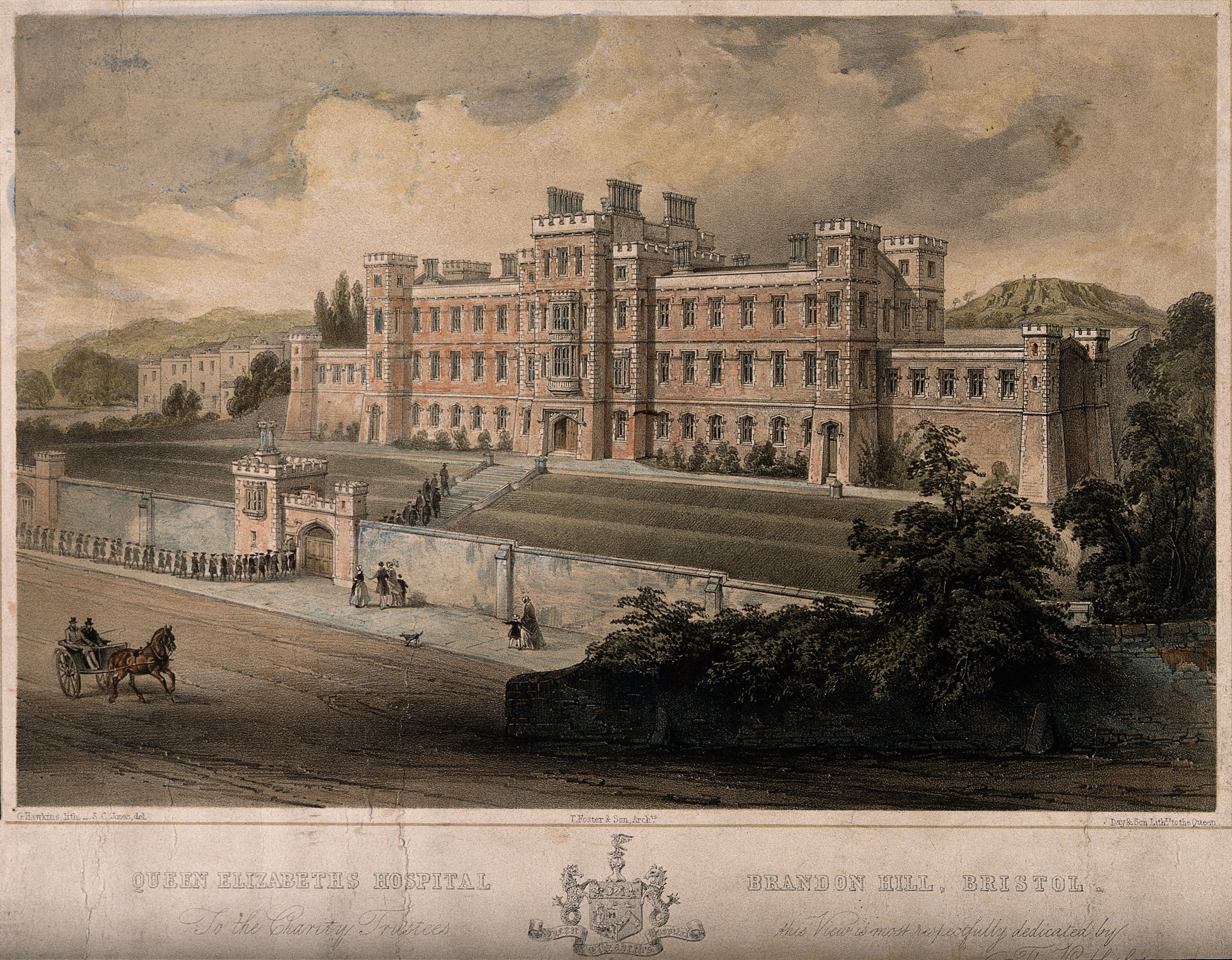

Address
- Berkeley Place, Clifton; Bristol; England
- Coordinates: 51.4547°N 2.6093°W

Information
- Local authority: Bristol City Council

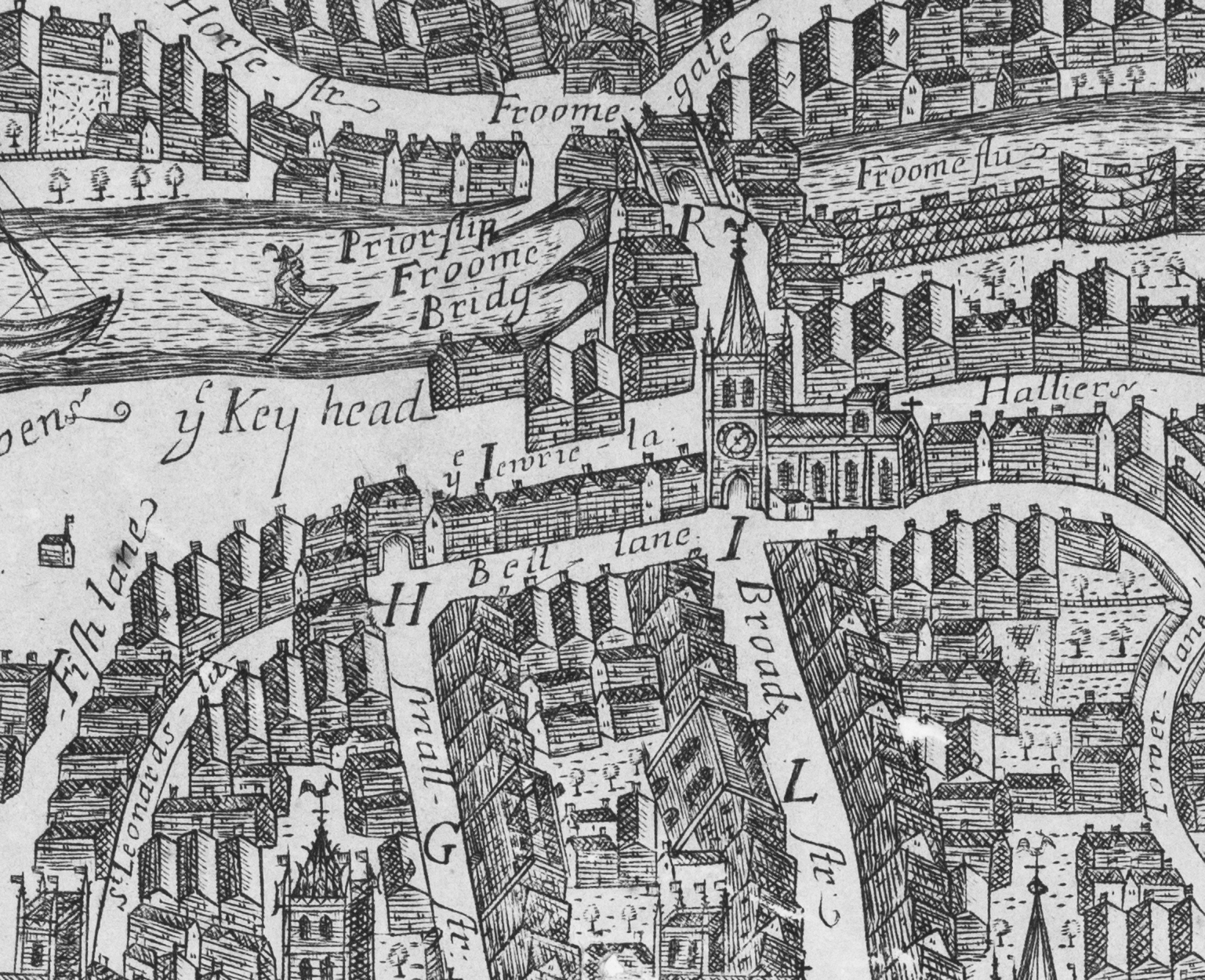
The Old Jewry (Jewrie Lane) in Bristol lay about a mile from the cemetery, in the centre of the city.

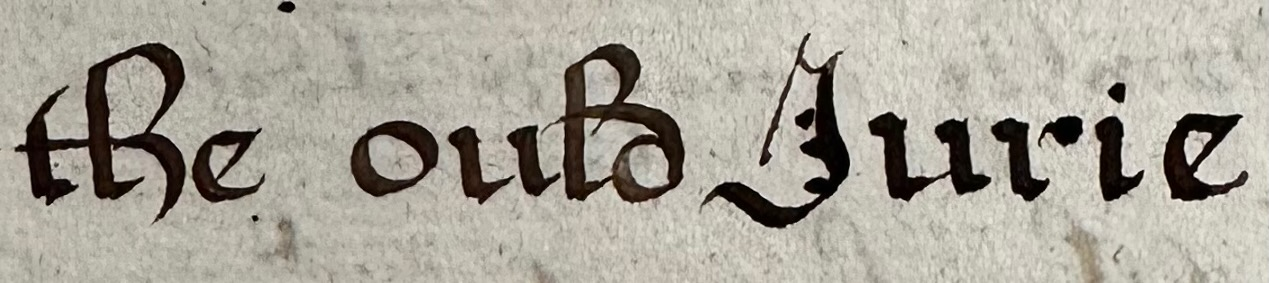
'The ould Jurie': Bristol street name recorded in a 1640 rental

The Jews Acre (alias Jews Churchyard) in Cliftonwood, Bristol, England was the burial ground of Bristol's medieval Jewish community from the late 12th century until the expulsion of the Jews from England in 1290. Bristol's Jews lived a mile east in the centre of the town, initially around the head of the harbour - an area that was later known as the Old Jewry. It was one of England's smaller Jewish communities, never exceeding about fifteen households. If the average household had five people, the mean population would have been about seventy-five people. Life expectancy at birth in pre-modern societies rarely exceed forty, with at least 2.5 per cent of any community dying each year. That would imply about two interments per year in the cemetery.

Jews Acre is associated with Jacob's Well, which lies about a hundred metres further down the valley. The well is believed to have been a bet tohorah (ritual bath) where corpses were washed prior to interment in the cemetery. After a body had been buried, those involved would also have used the water from the well to ritually purify themselves.

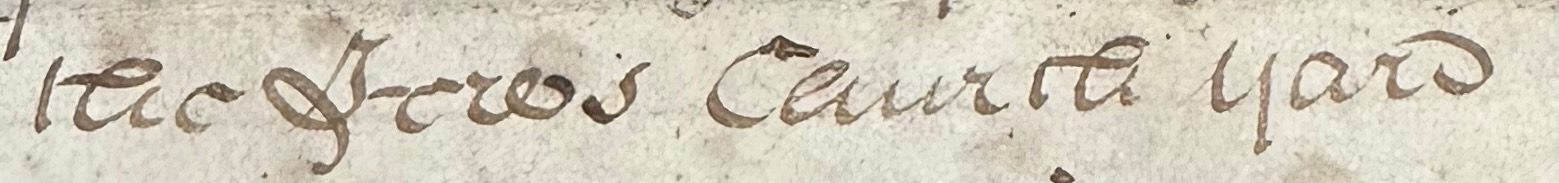
'the Jews Church yard' described in a 1788 lease

The Jews Acre, was known by that name, or as 'the Jews Churchyard', until the nineteenth century. For instance, a 1788 lease for 'the Jews church yard', records it as being a property on Brandon Hill adjoining 'Jews Acre'. Both place names suggest that contemporaries understood the field to be the burial ground of the medieval Jewish community.

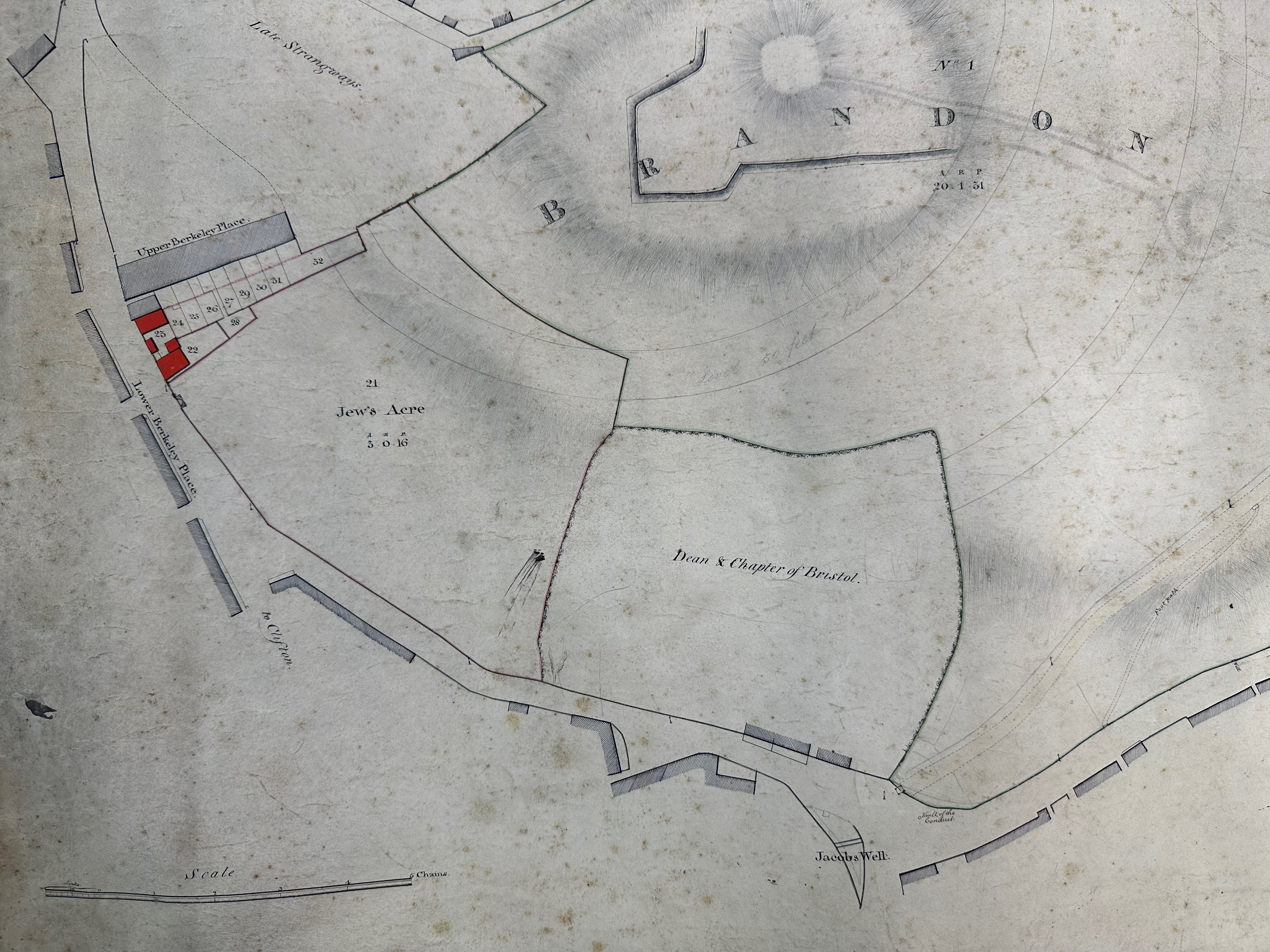
Jews Acre on Brandon Hill plan 1823

The Jews Acre was bought in 1847 by Queen Elizabeth's Hospital (also known as 'QEH'), an independent school in Bristol. Founded in 1586, the school had previously been based in the centre of the city, but decided to move to a new, greener site, on the edge of Clifton. The property known as Jews Acre became the boundary of the school. Despite its name, the actual field was 3.2 acres in size (1.3 hectares). Apart from two small additions (QEH Theatre) and a southern annex, both acquired in the later twentieth century, the school's boundary is still that of the Jews Acre.

During the construction of QEH school from 1847, a number of tombstones were found. Writing in 1861, the historian George Pryce discussed 'the “Jews Acre”, or burial ground, where now stands Queen Elizabeth's Hospital, on digging the foundation for which, a few years ago, a number of gravestones were found, with inscriptions in Hebrew characters; they were, however, thoughtlessly used in the building' This became a source of humour in Victorian Bristol, it later being noted that 'Many gravestones with Hebrew inscriptions were discovered when that building [QEH] was about to be erected, which led our Wits to assert that whatever else the boys lacked, they would always have a good Hebrew foundation.'
