= Hartley Heard =

English cricketer

Personal information
- Full name: Hartley Heard
- Born: 29 October 1947 (age 79); Bristol, England
- Batting: Right-handed
- Bowling: Right-arm medium

Domestic team information
- Years: Team
- 1967–1970: Oxford University
- 1969: Gloucestershire

Career statistics
| Competition | First-class | List A |
|---|---|---|
| Matches | 30 | 2 |
| Runs scored | 273 | 0 |
| Batting average | 8.80 | 0.00 |
| 100s/50s | –/– | –/– |
| Top score | 31 | 0 |
| Balls bowled | 3,854 | 85 |
| Wickets | 49 | 2 |
| Bowling average | 41.79 | 28.50 |
| 5 wickets in innings | 1 | – |
| 10 wickets in match | – | – |
| Best bowling | 6/78 | 2/21 |
| Catches/stumpings | 5/– | 1/– |
- Source: Cricinfo, 3 March 2020

Hartley Heard (born 29 October 1947) is an English former first-class cricketer and educator.

Heard was born at Bristol in October 1947. He was educated at Queen Elizabeth's Hospital, before going up to Exeter College, Oxford. While studying at Oxford, he played first-class cricket for Oxford University, making his debut against Warwickshire at Oxford in 1967. He played first-class cricket for Oxford until 1970, making a total of 29 appearances. Playing as a right-arm medium pace bowler, he took 49 wickets at an average of 40.91, with best figures of 6 for 78. In addition to playing first-class cricket for Oxford, he also appeared for a combined Oxford and Cambridge Universities team against the touring West Indians in May 1969. In July of the same year, he played two List A matches for Gloucestershire against Glamorgan and Nottinghamshire in the 1969 Player's County League. After graduating from Oxford, he became a schoolmaster at Mill Hill School.
