= Mark Wright (British politician) =

English politician (b.1974)

Executive Councillor responsible for Housing, Service Improvement and IT for Bristol City Council
- In office 2009–2011

Councillor for Hotwells and Harbourside
- In office 2016 – 9 May 2021
- Preceded by: Ward established
- Succeeded by: Alex Hartley

Councillor for Cabot
- In office 2005–2016
- Succeeded by: Ward abolished

Personal details
- Born: 1974 (age 51–52)
- Party: Liberal Democrats
- Education: University of Bristol

Mark Wright is a Liberal Democrat politician from Bristol, United Kingdom. He was the councillor for Cabot ward from 2005 until the ward's abolition in 2016. He then was elected for the new successor ward of Hotwells and Harbourside in 2016. Between 2009 and 2011 he was Executive Councillor responsible for Housing, Service Improvement and IT on Bristol City Council in Bristol, England.

== Background ==
Mark Wright was born in Bristol in 1974, went to schools in Bristol and has a degree in chemistry from University of Bristol. He also completed a PhD in astrophysics at Bristol University, with a thesis on "interstellar hydroxyl masers" that won the Royal Astronomical Society's prize for "Best PhD in the UK" in 2002.

== Politics ==
In his role on the council executive, Wright was responsible for nearly 30,000 council houses in the city that house over 60,000 residents, the first council house building program in Bristol for nearly 30 years. Under his IT remit he tightened the council's rules on RIPA authorisations to limit council "snooping" on residents. He was also chairman of one of the City Council's planning committees from 2007 to 2009.

He was a member of the South West Provisional Council and sat on the "West of England Partnership" Planning and Housing Board. He was a Governor of St George's Primary School, which he helped save from closure in 2008.

He has a record of opposing ID cards, supporting tidal power in the Severn Estuary and supporting civil liberties, and campaigning for reform of Parliamentary expenses. He has also campaigned against nuclear power and against light pollution.

In 2006 he helped save a popular piece of graffiti by local artist Banksy; an online petition he started collected over 3,500 signatures.

He was the Liberal Democrat candidate for Bristol South constituency at the 2010 General Election and again for the 2015 General Election.

He writes a Substack called Liberal Frontier.

=== Open Standards advocacy ===
Wright has been a proponent of open source, open document formats, and open data in UK local government.
