= Jacob's Well (sermon collection) =

Collection of 15th-century sermons

Jacob's Well is a 15th-century collection of 95 sermons in Middle English. The sermons were delivered on consecutive days "in some kind of homiletic marathon" and the written form reflects the spoken word, with remarks like "the other day I told you". The audience, addressed as "friends and sires", would appear to have consisted of "ordinary country people".

== Editions ==
- Brandeis, Arthur, ed. Jacob's Well: An English Treatise on the Cleansing of Man's Conscience. Kegan Paul, Trench, Trübner & Co., 1900.
