= Queen Elizabeth's Hospital =

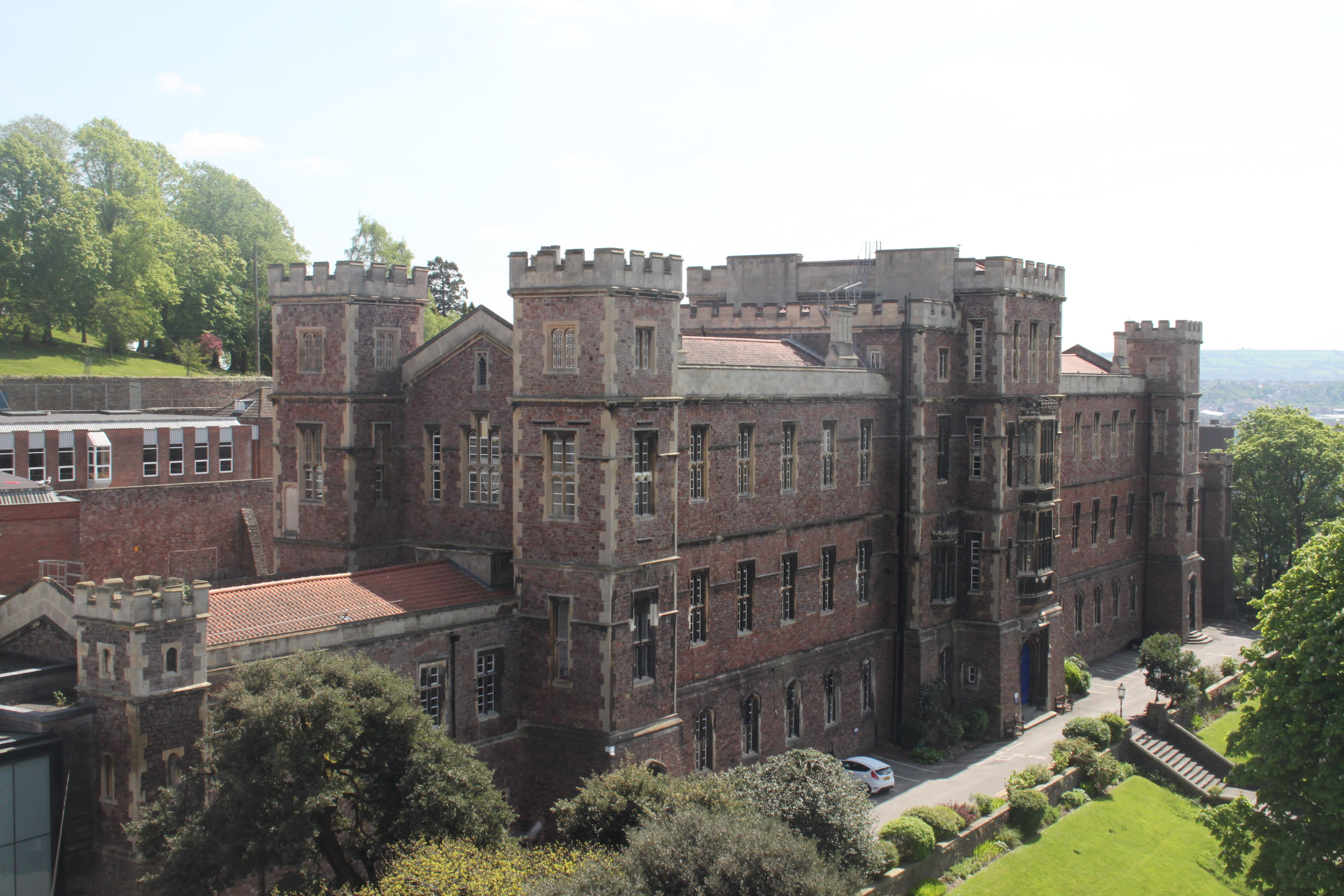
- The main building

Location
- Berkeley Place, Clifton; Bristol, BS8 1JX; England; 51.4547°N 2.6093°W

Information
- Other name: QEH
- Type: 7–18 Private boys day school, with co–educational Sixth Form
- Motto: Latin: Dum tempus habemus operemur bonum (Whilst we have time, let us do good)
- Religious affiliation: Christian
- Established: 1586; 440 years ago
- Founder: John Carr
- Local authority: Bristol City Council
- Department for Education URN: 109370 Tables
- Headmaster: Rupert Heathcote
- Gender: Boys
- Age: 7 to 18
- Enrolment: 670
- Capacity: 670
- Houses: Bird's; Carr's; Hartnell's; Ramsey's
- Colours: Blue and yellow
- Alumni: Old Elizabethans
- Website: www.qehbristol.co.uk

Queen Elizabeth's Hospital (QEH) is a 7–18 private boys' day school in Clifton, Bristol, England, founded in 1586. QEH is named after its original patron, Queen Elizabeth I. Known traditionally as "The City School", Queen Elizabeth's Hospital was founded by the will of affluent soap merchant John Carr in 1586, gaining its first royal charter on 21 March 1590.

The school accepts boys from ages 7 to 18 and, since September 2017, girls aged 16 to 18 into the co-educational Sixth Form. The school began as a boarding school, accepting day boys for the first time in the early 1920s. Boarders continued to wear the traditional bluecoat uniform on a daily basis until the 1980s. After that, it was only worn on special occasions. Following a steady decline in numbers QEH stopped accepting new boarders in 2004, and boarding closed completely in July 2008. A Junior School opened in September 2007 in terraced Georgian town houses in Upper Berkeley Place, adjacent to the main school.

== Overview ==
The school is located in central Bristol, near Cabot Tower on Brandon Hill, in a building built of Brandon stone, designed by local architects Foster and Son and dating from 1847. It has been designated by English Heritage as a grade II listed building. The terrace steps and walls are also grade II listed, as are the walls, lodge and gates. Before moving to the site on Brandon Hill, which was previously known as the Jews Acre, the school was housed at Gaunt's Hospital mansion house, Unity Street (1590–1767) and St. Bartholomew's, Christmas Steps (1767–1847). QEH has had close associations with Redmaids' High School since the latter's founding in 1634.

To celebrate 425 years since the school's opening, a new school song was composed in 2015.

== Background ==
=== Admittance ===
For much of its history, QEH has provided education for boys aged 11 to 18, although it now has an all-boys junior school from age 7 as well. In 2014 QEH began working with Redland High School on a co-educational infant school from age 2 to 7 years. Since September 2017, the Sixth Form has been co-educational. QEH Senior School has an entrance examination in January for students entering at Year 7 and Year 9 levels, boys take papers in Maths, English, Verbal Reasoning and Non Verbal Reasoning. These papers are used to select those eligible for John Carr academic scholarships. Boys applying for Music scholarships are invited to an interview and audition, at which they perform music and complete an aural and sight reading test. Sports scholarships are awarded based on an interview and practical tasks. The Year 7 entrants are generally chosen by around Easter and attend an initiation day during the summer term. Boys and girls also regularly enter the school at Sixth Form level, including international students.

=== Facilities ===
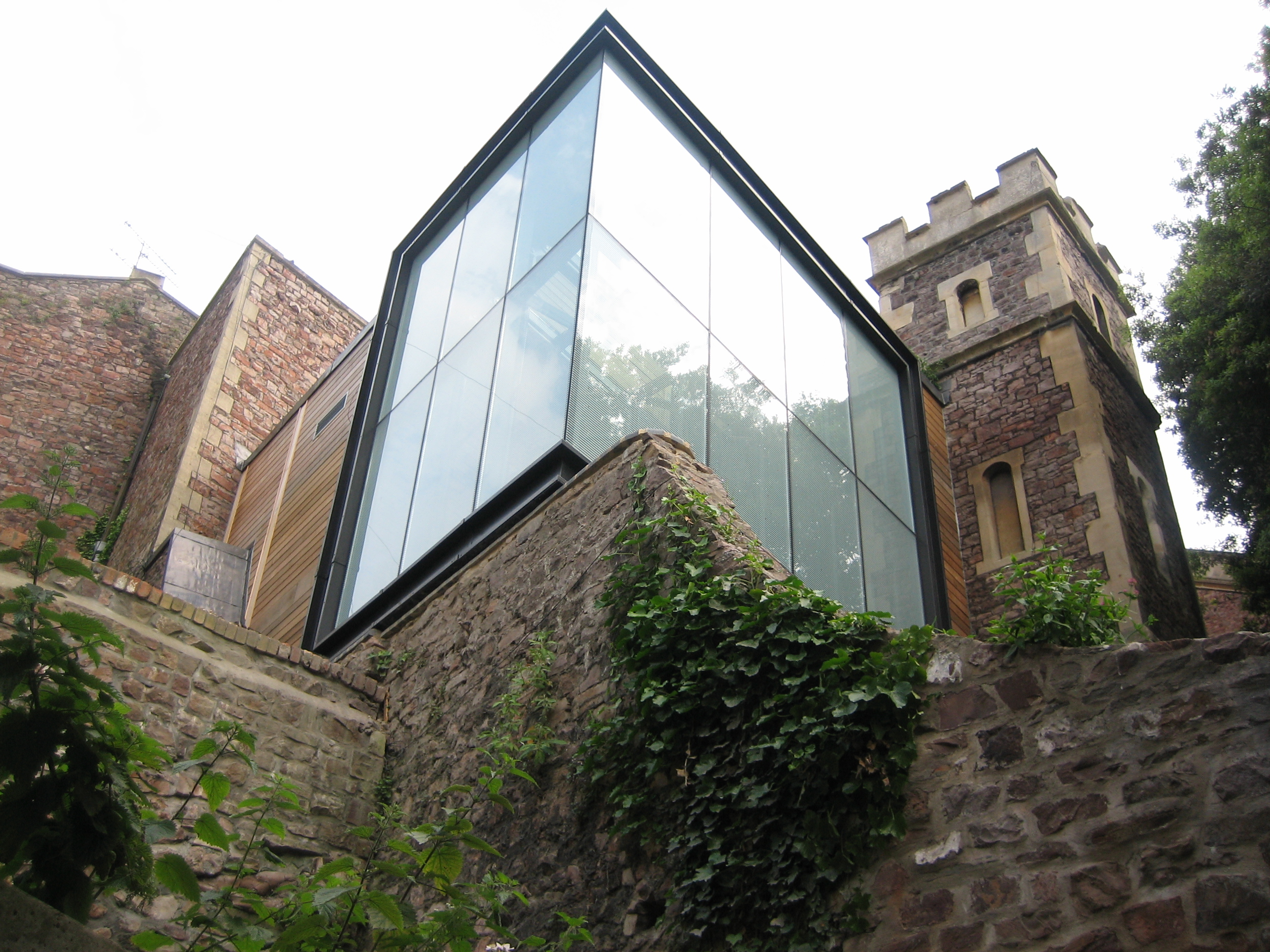
The Sixth Form Centre

The school has four ICT suites and several sets of laptops, and most classrooms contain Smart Boards. Pupils are given a school email address and can connect to the school network from home to access files and other resources.

The school library, located at the top of the main building, contains more than 10,000 books and takes 35 periodicals, including magazines and national newspapers. Pupil librarians help to run the library and the role of Head Librarian is given to a student in the Upper Sixth.

The school possesses 23 acres of playing fields outside Bristol, near the village of Failand, which are managed in partnership with Bristol City F.C., who use the land for training.

The Sixth Form centre includes its own IT suite, communal study area and common room, with a cafeteria serving hot and cold food at break and lunchtimes.

They have recently opened a new £3.5 million ceramic and science block and have recently completed a £2.5 million redevelopment of their playing fields near Failand.

=== School day ===
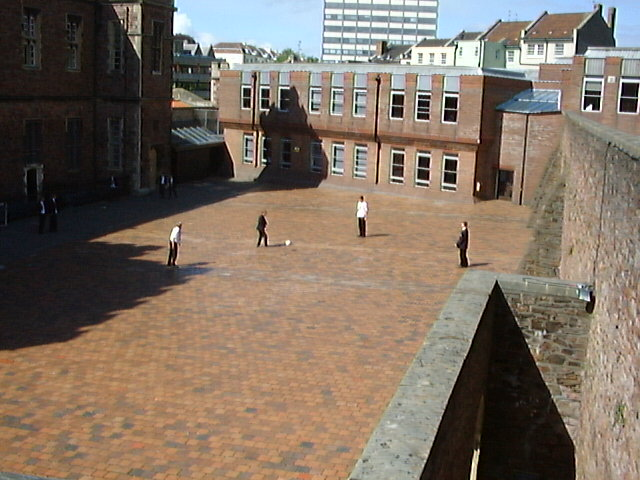
The Yard, used for ball games during break and lunch

The school day begins at 08:35 am with registration in each class's form room. This is followed on Mondays by a school assembly attended by years 11 to 13 in the dining hall led by the Headmaster with years 7 to 10 having this on Wednesday. The day is divided into eleven 35-minute periods. The first two are from 9–10:10 am, followed by a 30-minute break, then three more periods, before lunch starts at 12:30 pm and ends at 1:40 pm. After four more lessons, at 4:00 pm the school day ends.

All boys have one afternoon of sports per week. For year 7, it takes place on Monday while for year 8, it takes place on Wednesdays at the school's Failand playing fields, where rugby is played during the autumn term and football in the spring term, and cricket or athletics during the summer. Years 9 and 10 have games on Tuesdays, and are given a choice of sports, while year 11 and sixth form have games on Thursdays. There are also gym periods for years 7–11 during the rest of the week.

In year 7, boys are taught Latin, English, Spanish, maths, geography, history, religious studies, Art, biology, physics and chemistry, as well as periods for sport. In year 8, boys are taught all of the above as well as an extra language (German or French). In year 9, boys must choose two creative subjects (design technology, information technology, art, drama, music or Latin, the latter occupying both choices), which are each taught once a week for a double period. Boys are expected to take up to ten GCSEs, including a modern foreign language, maths, English language, English literature, and two out of the three sciences, taught as separate disciplines. Students take four subjects in the lower Sixth Form, with new subjects such as economics, classical civilisation, further mathematics and politics also available. One subject can then be dropped for their final year at the school in the Upper Sixth. The School also offers the Extended Project Qualification (EPQ) in Sixth Form.

=== Annual events ===
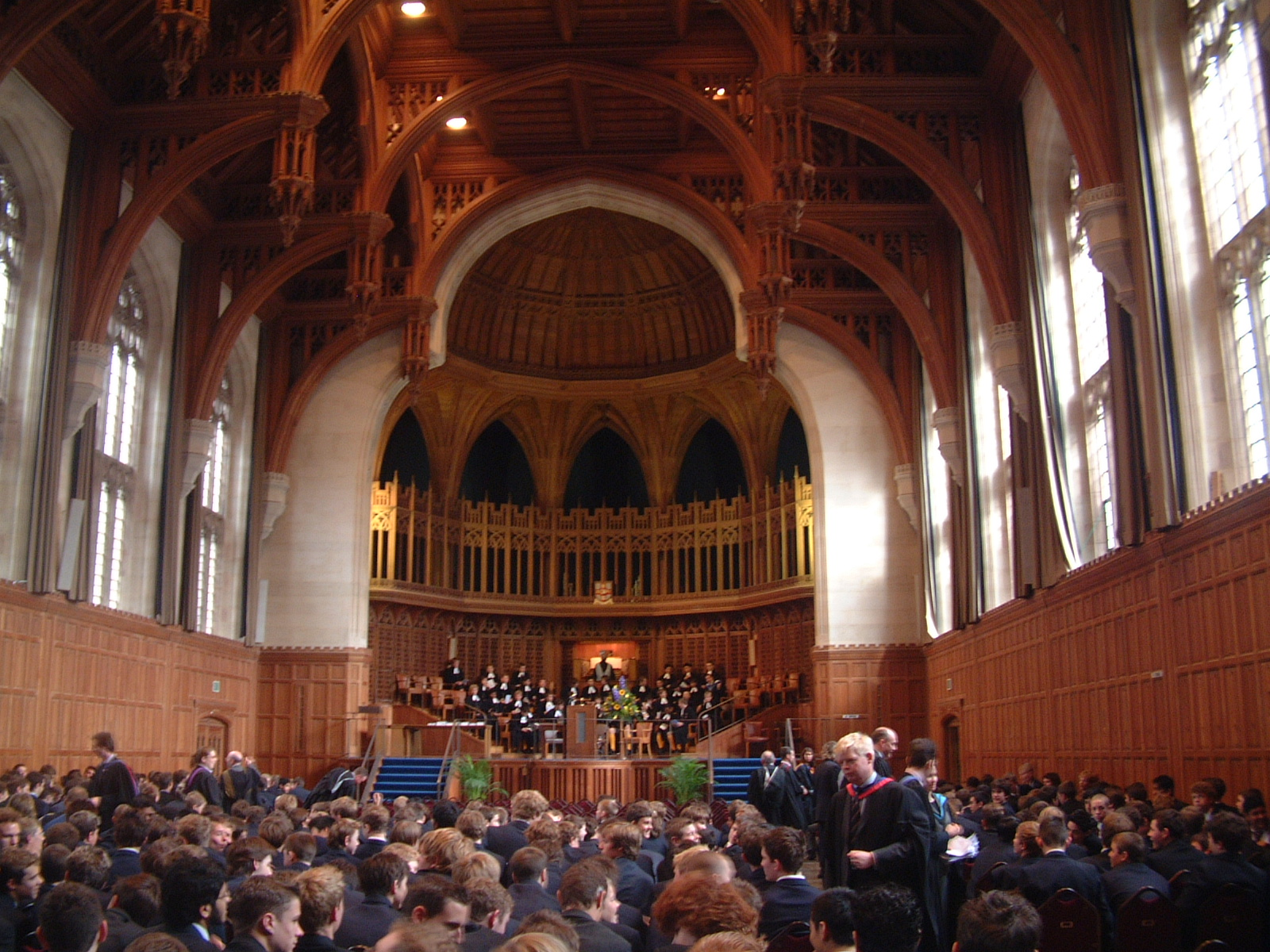
The 2004 Prize Giving ceremony at the Wills Memorial Building. The boarders and prefects can be seen in their bluecoat uniforms at the centre of the picture.

At the end of the first half of the autumn term, the school holds its prize giving in the Roman Catholic Clifton Cathedral. The headmaster reads his annual report, and a guest speaker gives the prizes to the winning pupils.

At the end of the winter term, the school holds its carol service at the Anglican Bristol Cathedral. The school returns to the cathedral at the end of the spring term for its Charter Day service, celebrating the founding of the school. This service is attended by the Lord Mayor of Bristol, and the school's original Elizabethan charter is put on display. The school choir often sings Council Prayers at the Lord Mayor's Chapel on College Green, where the school founder John Carr is buried.

=== School uniform ===
Standard school uniform for Years 7 to 11 consists of blue blazers, grey trousers, white shirts and the house tie.

Sixth Form students wear a grey or blue suit with pastel-coloured shirt. Students who excel at sports are often awarded with "house colours" for that sport in the form of a special tie. Prefects also wear a tie and badge of office.

==== Traditional bluecoat ====
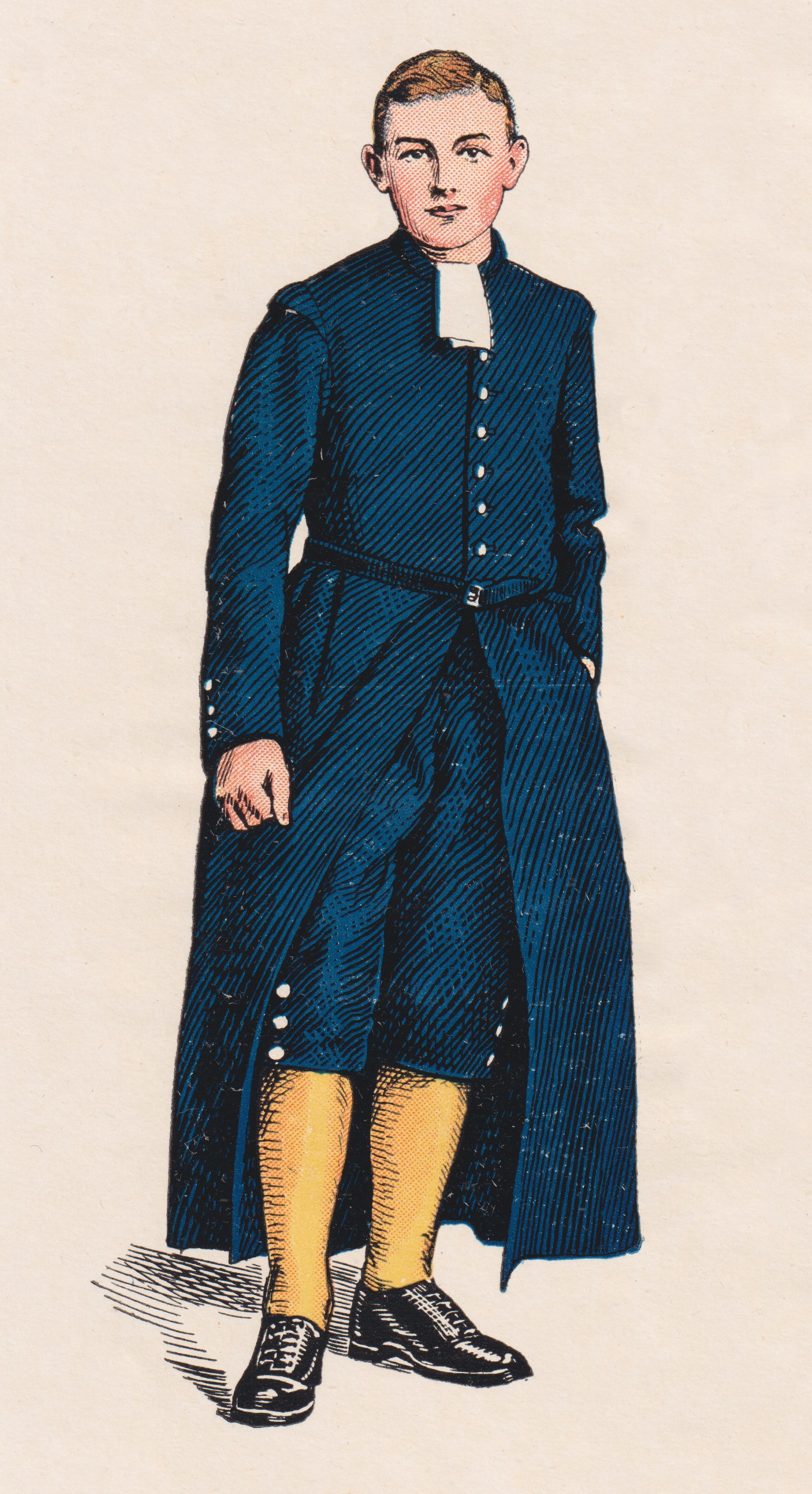
QEH school uniform, 1910

For a long time the school was a traditional bluecoat school. This dress was eventually phased out as day uniform, but was still sometimes worn by boarders (until the cessation of boarding in 2008), and is still worn by choir members, and by the Captain and Vice Captains of the school, for special occasions such as Charter Day.

=== House system ===
QEH operates a house system whereby students are allocated to one of four houses and engage in house activities including academic competitions (such as foreign language readings), sports competitions, house drama, house choir, house music ensemble and many others.

Each house is named after one of the school's notable patrons. The four houses are Bird's, named after William Bird, Mayor of Bristol 1589-90 and major benefactor of the school; Carr's, named after the school founder John Carr; Hartnell's, named after Samuel Hartnell; Ramsey's, named after Lady Mary Ramsey. Hartnell was also a benefactor of the nearby school Clifton College, a fact reflected in them also having a house named Hartnell's.

Each house has its own colour, and senior school students up to year 11 wear a tie with a stripe of that colour. Sixth Form students who are house captains also wear ties bearing their house colours. The colours for the houses are Bird's (yellow); Carr's (blue); Hartnell's (green); Ramsey's (red).

Students who excel at helping their house (usually sporting) are awarded "house colours" consisting of a rectangular badge in the colour of their house.

The organisation of each house is carried out by a designated House Master, and two sixth-form students, the Captain and Vice Captain of the house, who are picked by the House Master in conjunction with senior members of staff.

== Publications ==
The school publishes several periodicals. QEH Matters is a small newsletter, published regularly and available from the school's website, containing information on sports activities, school trips, development plans and future events. There is also an annual publication, The Elizabethan, which gives a more in-depth commentary, as well as showcasing pupils' artistic and literary talents. A group of students, the Elizabethan Committee, supports the editor of The Elizabethan by taking photos and writing articles for the magazine. Along with this, an online newspaper called Berkeley Squares is written and edited by students in the sixth form. The QEH Podcast has been running since March 2021.

== QEH theatre ==
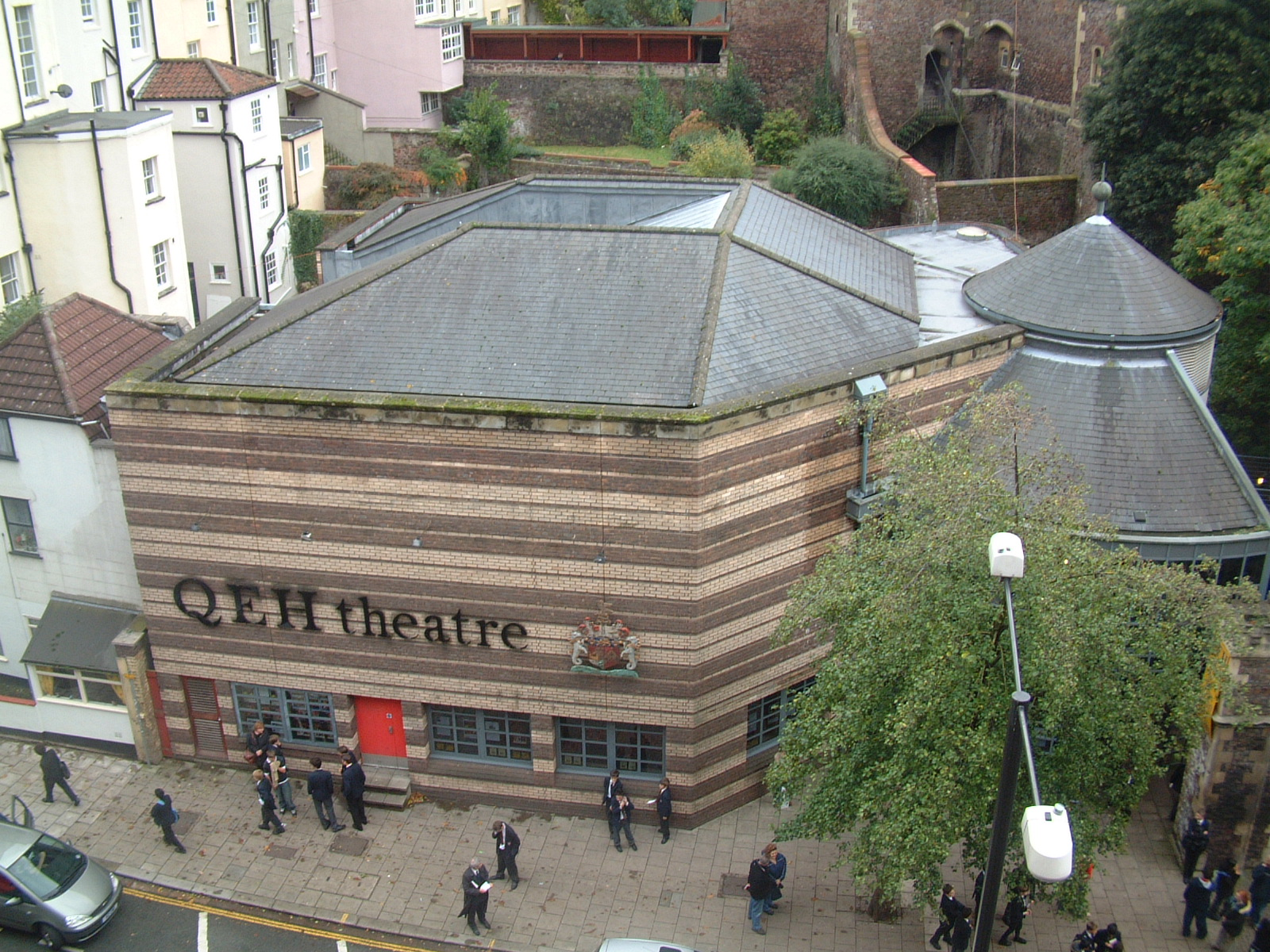
The QEH Theatre

The QEH theatre seats 200 to 211, and since opening in 1990 has been host to many productions both by QEH pupils and professional companies performing plays, dance and poetry. It also hosts concerts and other musical events, such as the biennial 'Battle of the Bands' and regular acoustic-only 'Unplugged' events, which showcase the musical talent in the school. Student volunteers often assist in school productions as technical and front-of-house staff.

== Notable alumni ==
Former pupils of the school are known as Old Elizabethans.

- Martin Bright (born 1966), British journalist, former Political Editor of the New Statesman and The Jewish Chronicle, and current Editor-at-Large of Index on Censorship
- Joe Bryan (born 1993), professional footballer for Millwall.
- Lewis Clarke (born November 18, 1997), youngest ever person to ski-trek 720 miles from the Antarctic Coast to the South Pole, 2013–14. Guinness World Record Holder.
- Jack Cuthbert (born 1987), professional rugby player for Scotland
- Shon Faye (born 1988), writer, comedian and transgender rights campaigner
- Jason Forbes (born 1990), actor and comedian
- William Friese-Greene (1855–1921), portrait photographer and inventor, and pioneer in the field of motion pictures
- Roy Harris (1931–2015), semiological linguist.
- James Heappey (born 1981), Conservative MP for Wells
- Hartley Heard (born 1947), Former first-class cricketer
- Sir Ivor Jennings (1903–1965), jurist, educator and Vice-Chancellor of the University of Cambridge
- Ricardo E. Latcham (1869–1943), English-Chilean archaeologist, ethnologist, folklore scholar and teacher.
- Simon Mann (cricket commentator), BBC radio sports commentator
- Andy Parker (born 1957), physicist, head of Cavendish Laboratory
- Jonathan Pearce (born 1959), football commentator for the BBC
- Ashley Pharoah (born 1959), writer and co-creator of the television series Life on Mars
- Mike Smith, President of music at Virgin EMI Records
- Anthony Verity (born 1939), Master of Dulwich College from 1986 to 1995
- Keith Vinicombe (born 1953) British ornithologist and writer on bird identification.
- Hugo Weaving (born 1960), film and stage actor
- Dino Zamparelli (born 1992), racing driver

== Archives ==
Records of QEH are held at Bristol Archives, including foundation, administrative, property, financial, admission, and illustrative material (Ref. 42536) (online catalogue).
