= Soiled =

Soiled is an English experimental, electro-minimal cinematographic music project, created in 2002 by Marcus H. He has released five albums, numerous EPs, collaborations and compilation tracks.

== History ==
Marcus H is originally from Bristol having played in bands, most notably Kubrick (1990–1996).

Since 2003, Marcus H has used an internet approach to the promotion of his music project Soiled. Releasing music via Elm Lodge Records, Bizarre, Electronic Musik, Dirty Patches. His music has featured on US College Radio Kalx, Huw Stephens' BBC Radio 1 show, BBC Radio 6 Music Freakzone and BBC Radio Tees celebration of The Beatles album Revolver, where he covered "Yellow Submarine".

In 2012, Marcus H participated in a split album release with Mike Bryson from Bogshed called Vier Mit Vier, released on Marcus H's own label Elm Lodge Records.

His track "Autumn in Flashbacks" which features on his 2014 album Splices and Phases was included by Mojo (issue 254) on its playlist. Mojo described Marcus H as a dark ambient maestro. The album also featured in The Quietus.

In 2017, he released his fifth album, Phonic Grafts, described in Electronic Sound Magazine as "File next to KLF 'Chill out' & Global Comms '76.14', yup, its that good!".

== Notes ==
- Revolver album resurrected on Teesside. BBC Tees. BBC. 18 August 2006. Retrieved 17 February 2013.
