= Brandon Hill, Bristol =

Public park in Bristol

Brandon Hill
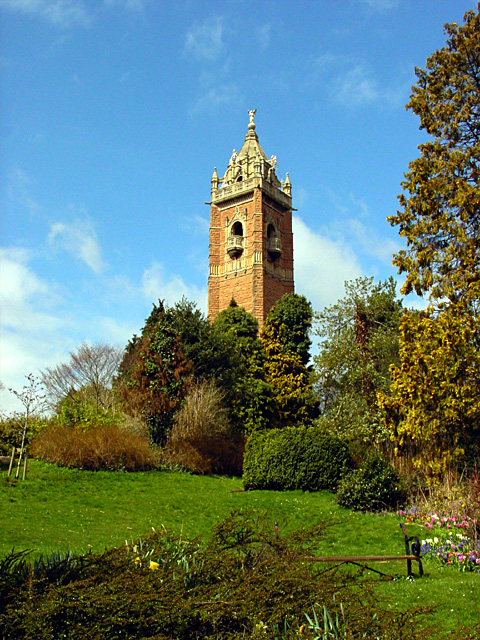
- Cabot Tower on top of Brandon Hill, Bristol
- Interactive map of Brandon Hill
- Nearest city: Bristol
- OS grid: ST 57933 72833
- Coordinates: 51°27′10″N 2°36′24″W
- Website: www.bristol.gov.uk/residents/museums-parks-sports-and-culture/parks-and-open-spaces/parks-and-estates/brandon-hill

Brandon Hill, also known as St Brandon's Hill, is a hill close to Bristol city centre, between the districts of Clifton and Hotwells, in south west England.

At the summit is the Cabot Tower, opened in 1897 to commemorate the 400th anniversary of John Cabot's voyage from Bristol to Newfoundland in 1497.

The upper part of the hill is a steep park, Brandon Hill Park, divided into informal gardens, a small nature reserve and open grassland. The two-hectare nature reserve has been run since 1980 by the Avon Wildlife Trust who have their headquarters beside the park. The wildflower meadow includes ox-eye daisies, cowslip and knapweed. A pond provides a breeding site for frogs and toads, while foxes and pipistrelle bats can be seen in the evening. The butterfly garden supplies food for caterpillars and many kinds of butterflies. Birds such as jay, bullfinch and blackcap are seen in the reserve.

The lower slopes of the hill were developed in the 18th and 19th centuries. St George's Church lies on Great George Street on the eastern slope, Berkeley Square is on the northern edge, and the school buildings of Queen Elizabeth's Hospital are on the western side.

== History ==
Brandon Hill was granted to the council in 1174 by the Earl of Gloucester and was used for grazing until 1625 when it became a public open space, possibly the oldest municipal open space in the country. Before the Reformation, a hermitage and chapel dedicated to the Irish saint Brendan stood at the summit of the hill, in which a series of hermits lived between 1314 and 1480, including the anchoress Lucy de Newchurch. When the antiquary William Worcester visited St Brendan's chapel in 1480 he recorded it as being 8.5 yards long x 5 yards wide. The hermitage belonged to St James' Priory in Bristol, who likened the hill to Mount Calvary in Jerusalem.

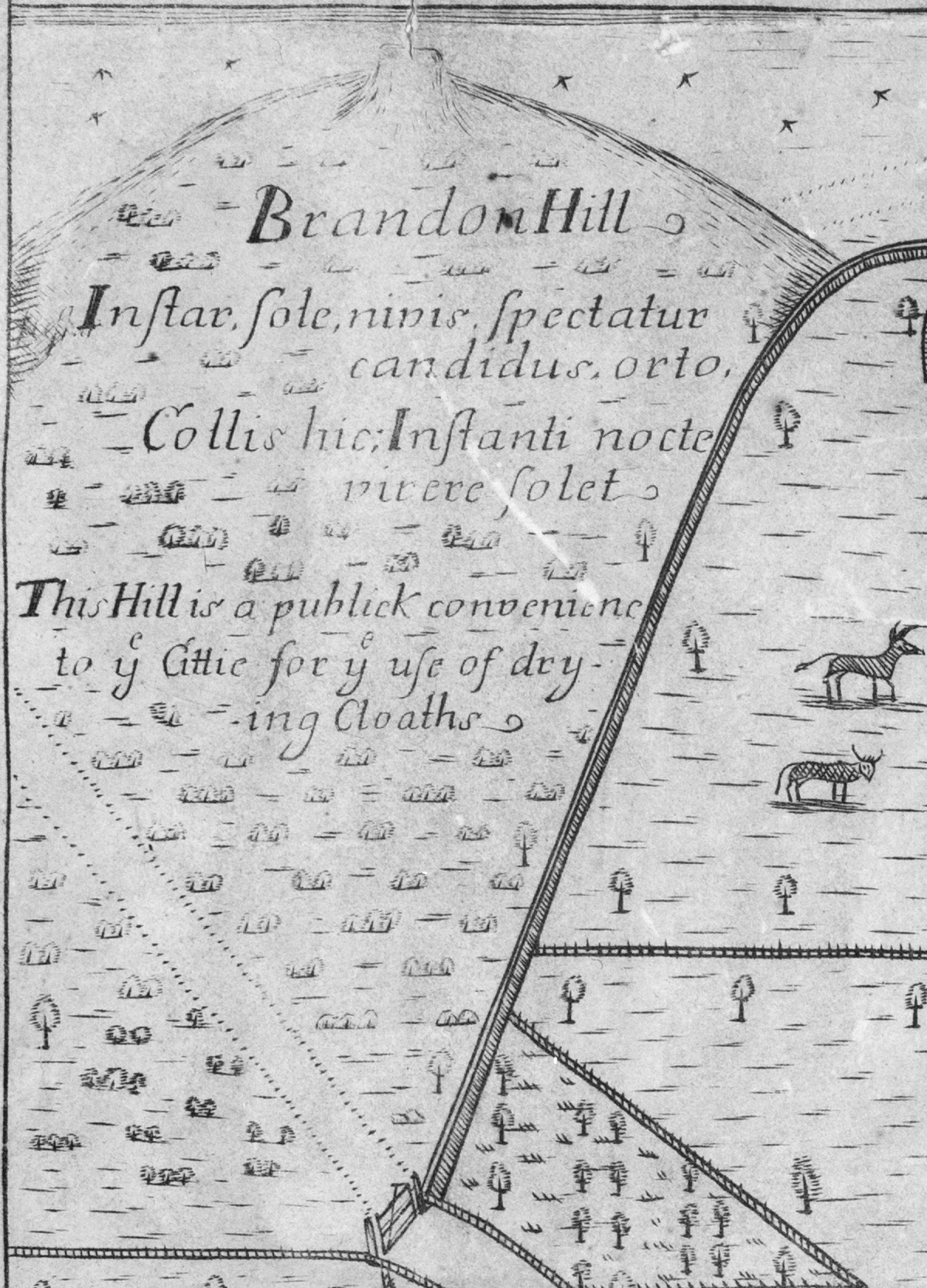
Brandon Hill depicted on James Millerd's 1673 map of Bristol

In 1533, Bristol corporation's recognised Brandon Hill as being open to the public and for use by washerwomen for drying clothes. Its common use for this purpose later transmuted into the legend that this right was granted by Queen Elizabeth I on the occasion of her visit to the city in 1574. It was said she did this to compensate the city's washerwomen for their ugliness. The hill's continued use for drying clothes is recorded on James Millerd's 1673 map of Bristol, which notes that: 'The Hill is a publick convenience to the Cittie for the use of dry-ing Cloaths'. The Latin text on his map reads:

Instar, sole, nivis. Spectatur candidus, orto, Collis hic; Instanti nocte virere solet (Translation: In the very likeness of snow, this hill glows white at the rising of the sun, and is accustomed to become green with the coming of night)

The Latin text presumably implies that so much washing was hung up on the hill during the day that it looked white from the city, while at dusk it turned green again when the washing was taken in. Parts of the hill were still used for drying clothes in the late nineteenth century.

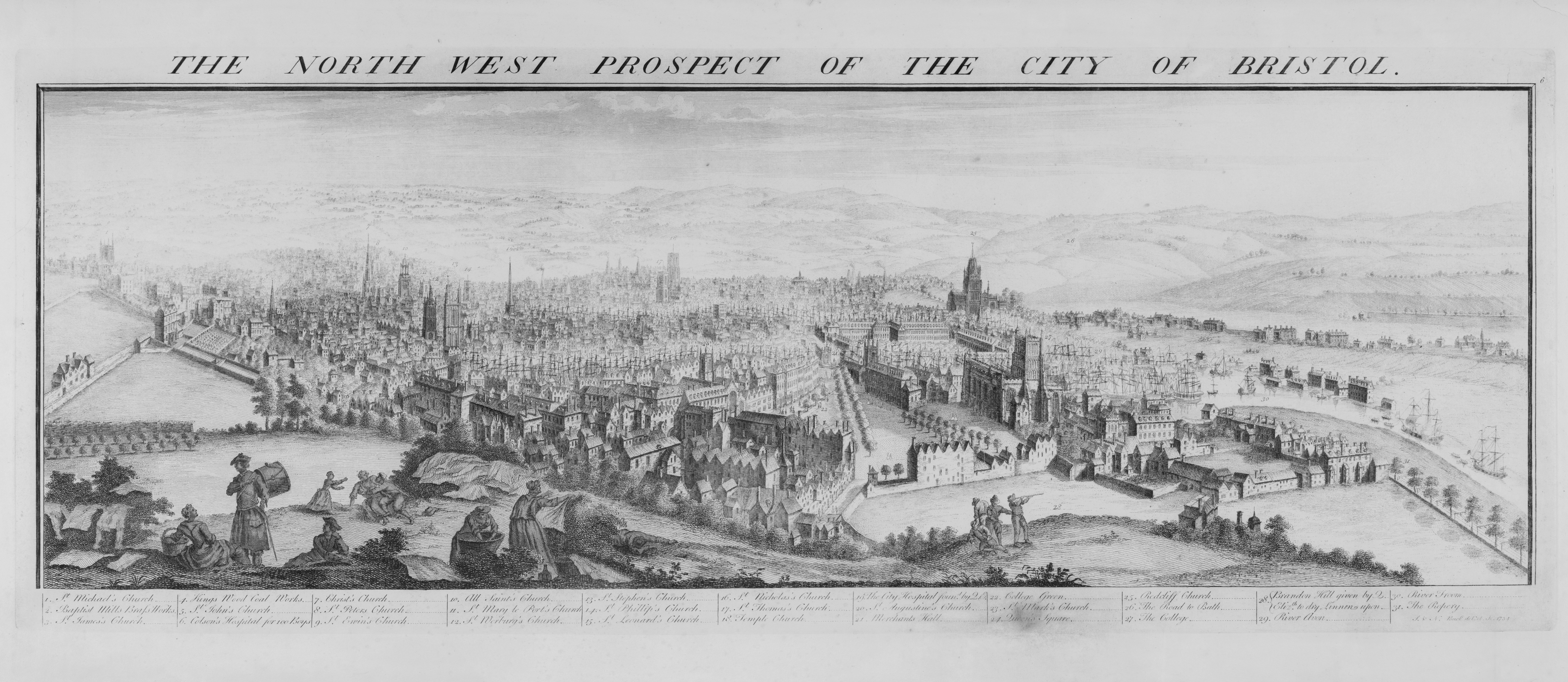
Bristol seen from the summit of Brandon Hill, 1734. Washerwomen in foreground.

A wooden windmill was built on the summit of Brandon Hill from 1564, which led to a legal dispute when it was discovered that that the four acre plot on which the windmill stood belonged to the Crown as part of the lands seized from Tewkesbury Abbey during the Dissolution of the Monasteries. The Corporation was forced to pay £30 to buy the plot.

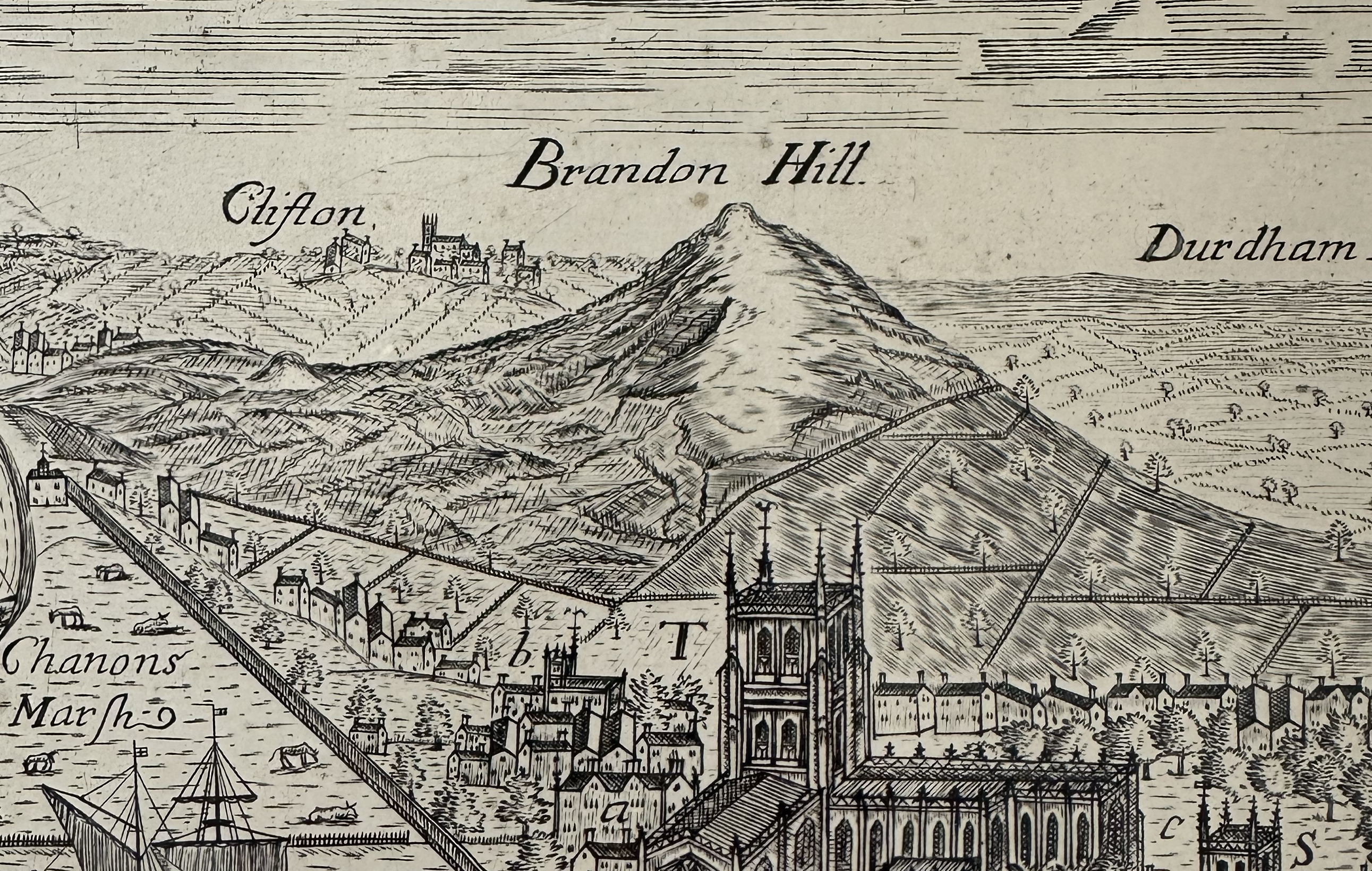
Brandon Hill depicted in Millerd's prospect of Bristol, 1673

In 1642, during the English Civil War, the windmill on the summit of Brandon Hill was converted into a small fort. It played an active part in the parliamentarian defence of the city from royalist forces in July 1643. The fort was then occupied by royalist forces until the capture of Bristol by Parliament in September 1645.

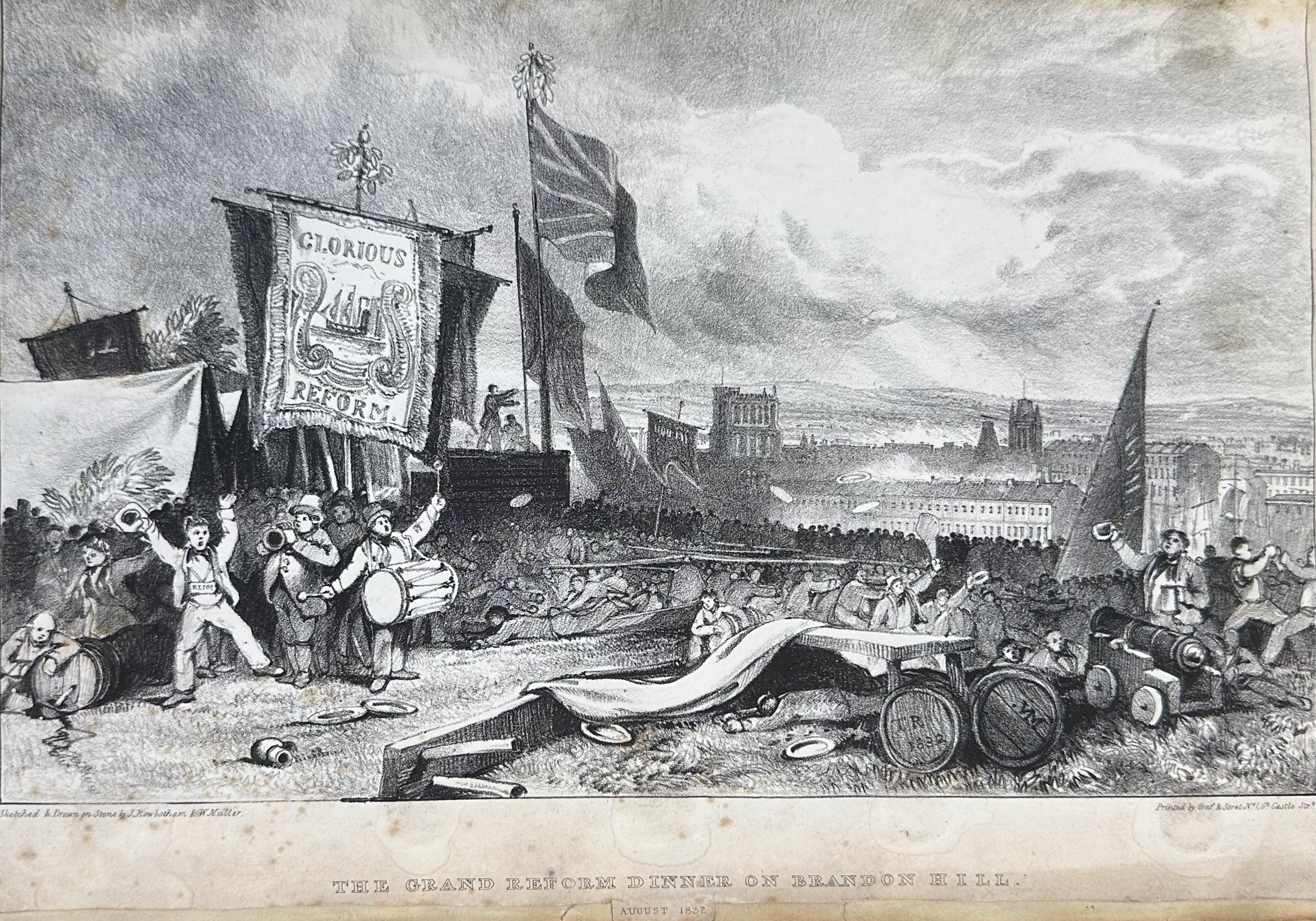
The Grand Reform Dinner on Brandon Hill, Aug 1832

During the late eighteenth and early nineteenth century Brandon Hill was a popular venue for public meetings by reform groups like the Chartists. In 1832, the hill was the location of the Grand Reform Dinner, to celebrate the passing of the Representation of the People Act. The dinner was famously gatecrashed by a mob of 14,000 working class Bristolians, who far outnumbered the 6,000 ticket holders.

From 1840 onward Brandon Hill was improved with walls and walks. A crowd of 30,000 watched the launch of SS Great Britain from the hill on 7 July 1843. It remained a site of popular protest however, with 20,000 unemployed workers gathering at the top the hill in January 1880 to protest their situation.

On 24 June 1897, the foundation stone of Cabot Tower was laid on the summit of the hill, to commemorate the 400th anniversary of John Cabot's 1497 voyage in the Matthew of Bristol to North America. The tower was officially opened to the public on 6 September 1898. The tower and its surrounding park remain one of Bristol's most popular free attractions.

== Popular culture ==
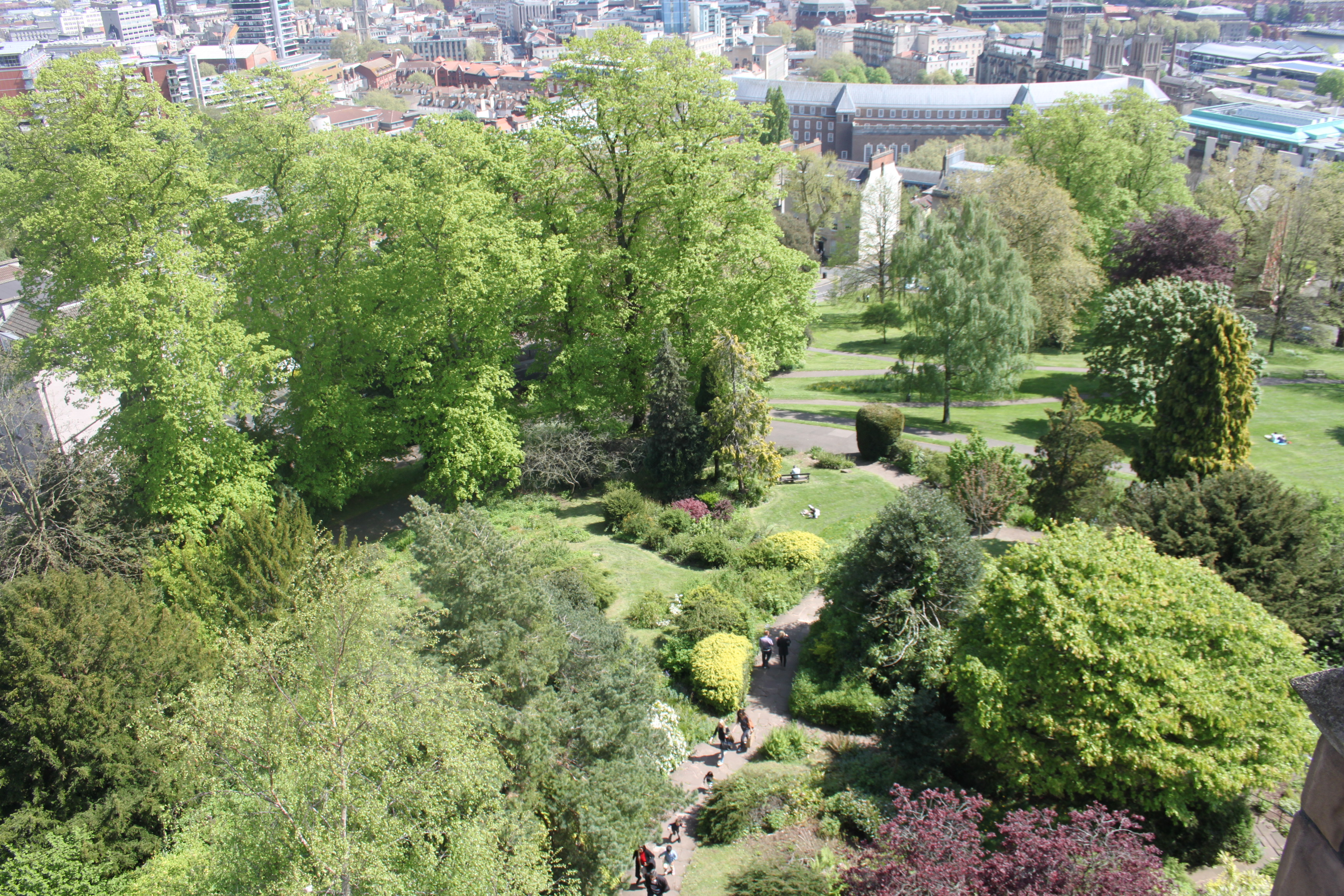
Brandon Hill from Cabot Tower

In the popular television series, Skins, Brandon Hill features on a number of occasions; including, Cassie's suicide attempt and as the rendezvous point for Sid and Cassie at the climax of the first series.

In the Rabbit Premier League, a Fantasy Football league hailing from Downers Grove, Illinois, a team in the Cottontail International Division is based in Bristol, specifically Brandon: The Brandon Hill Perlfees.

Marcus H / soiled wrote the track Brandon Hill Tandle Hill which featured on his album Splices and Phases.

== See also ==
- Parks of Bristol
