= Cabot Tower, Bristol =

Tower in Bristol, England

Cabot Tower
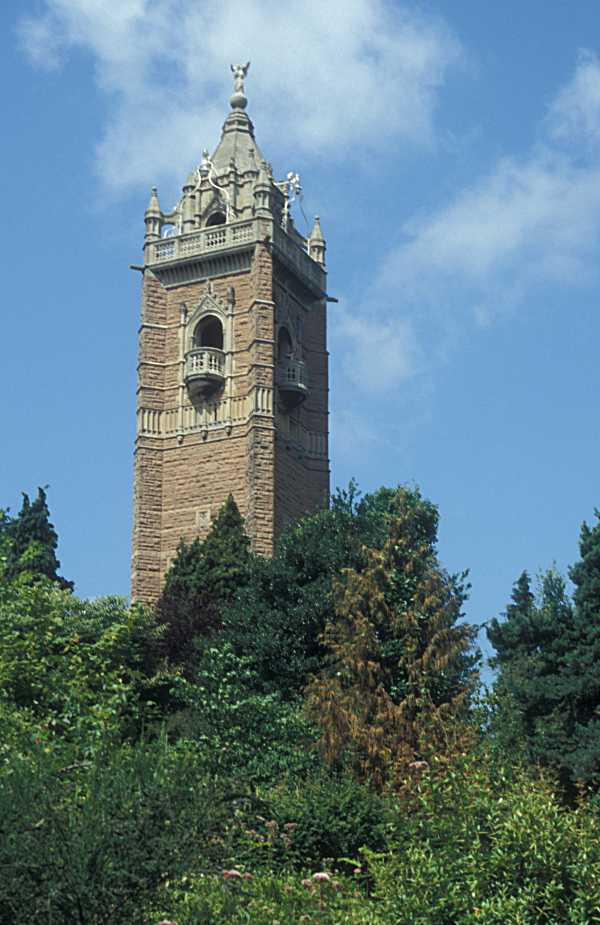
- The tower, viewed from Brandon Hill park.

- Location within Bristol

General information
- Architectural style: Neo-Gothic
- Location: Bristol, England
- Coordinates: 51.4540°N 2.6068°W
- Construction started: June 1897
- Completed: July 1898
- Cost: £3250

Height
- Height: 105 feet (32 m)

Technical details
- Structural system: Red sandstone, Bath Stone

Design and construction
- Architect: William Venn Gough
- Main contractor: Love & Waite

Cabot Tower is a tower in Bristol, England, situated in a public park on Brandon Hill, between the city centre, Clifton and Hotwells. It is a grade II listed building.

The tower was built in the 1890s to commemorate the 400th anniversary of the journey of John Cabot from Bristol to land which later became Canada. Public access to the viewing platforms at the top of the tower was suspended from 2007 to 2011 for repairs.

== History ==
The site of the tower was occupied in the Middle Ages by a chapel which may have belonged to St James' Priory. During the 16th century the chapel was replaced by a windmill.

The tower was constructed in memory of John Cabot, 400 years after he set sail in Matthew from Bristol and landed in what was later to become Canada. It was paid for by public subscription. The foundation stone was laid on 24 June 1897 by the Marquis of Dufferin and Ava and the tower was completed in July 1898. The architect was William Venn Gough and it was built by Love and Waite of Bristol. A lift was originally planned but never installed.

The tower gave its name to the council ward of Cabot.

=== Restoration ===
After closure to the public in 2006, the tower reopened on 16 August 2011 following completion of repair works costing an estimated £420,000 to cracked stonework caused by corroded reinforcing steel, which had made the tower unsafe.

The final stage of the restoration was completed in 2014 with the reinstatement of a light flashing "Cabot Tower, Brandon Hill, Bristol" in Morse code, which had been turned off in 2001 after developing a technical problem.

== Architecture ==
Aerial video from the tower

The tower is 105 feet (32 m) high and built from red sandstone with cream Bath Stone for ornamentation and emphasis. It consists of a spiral staircase and two viewing platforms where balconies with wrought iron railings overlook the city, the higher of which is approximately 334 feet (102 m) above sea level. The tower is supported by diagonal buttresses and its top by flying buttresses; it is surmounted by an octagonal spirelet topped with a ball finial and a carved winged figure representing commerce.

On three sides of the base of the tower are commemorative plaques. They read as follows:

The foundation stone of this tower was laid by the Marquess of Dufferin & Ava on the 24 June 1897, And the completed tower was opened by the same nobleman on the 6 September 1898.
W.Howell Davies, Chairman of the executive committee
E.G.Clarke, J.W.Arrowsmith Hon. Secretaries

This tablet is placed here by the Bristol branch of the Peace Society in the earnest hope that peace and friendship may ever continue between the kindred peoples of this country and America

'Glory to God in the highest and on Earth, peace, good will towards men' Luke 2.14

This tower was erected by public subscription in the 61st year of the reign of Queen Victoria to commemorate the fourth centenary of the discovery of the continent of North America, on June 24, 1497, by John Cabot.
Who sailed from this port in the Bristol ship Matthew, with a Bristol crew, under letters patent granted by King Henry VII to that navigator and his sons Lewis, Sebastian and Sanctus

== See also ==
- Cabot Tower (Newfoundland)
- Dingle Tower, Nova Scotia, which has a bronze plaque depicting John Cabot
