= The Bearpit, Bristol =

Road junction and open space in Bristol, England

St James Barton roundabout
- The Bearpit
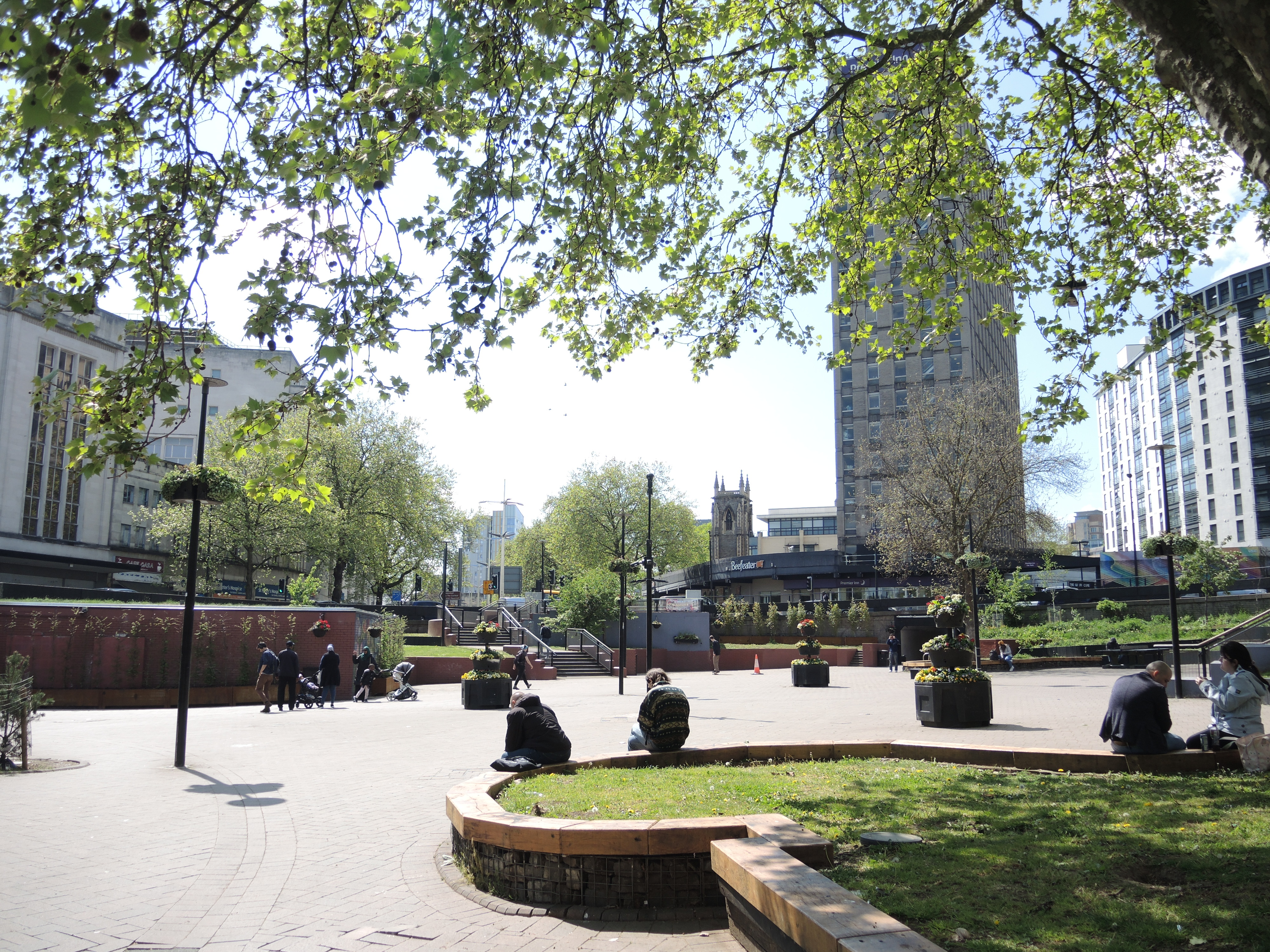
- The Bearpit in 2022
- Interactive map of St James Barton roundabout

Location
- Bristol, England
- Coordinates: 51°27′33.99″N 2°35′26.67″W
- Roads at junction: A38 (Stokes Croft / The Haymarket / Marlborough Street); A4044 (Bond Street)

Construction
- Type: Roundabout
- Constructed: 1967–68
- Opened: 1968
- Reconstructed: 2019
- Maintained by: Bristol City Council

The St James Barton roundabout, colloquially known as the Bearpit, is a grade-separated roundabout and sunken pedestrian area in the city centre of Bristol, England. Completed in 1968 as part of Bristol’s post-war road development scheme, it carries the north-south A38 and the east-west A4044 while pedestrians and cyclists circulate one storey below in a circular concourse whose form inspired the nickname.

Situated between the Broadmead retail district, Bristol Bus Station and Stokes Croft, the Bearpit is a key gateway for traffic arriving from the M32 and a busy foot-and cycle link into the city centre. Since 2010 the area has also been a focus for community-led trading, public art and urban-greening projects as well as periodic policing operations prompted by anti-social behaviour and rough sleeping.

== History ==
=== Origins and naming ===
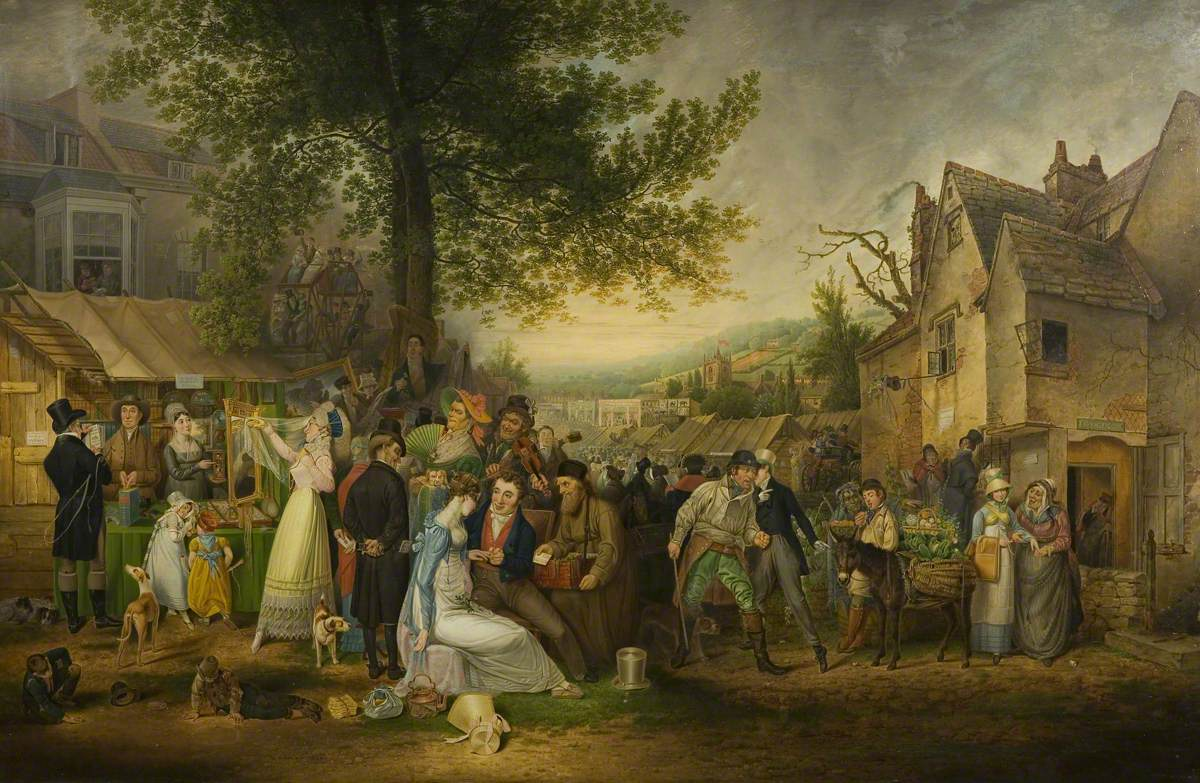
St James's Fair by Samuel Colman, 1824, depicts the fair that once took place in the area.

St James Barton developed as an open marketplace at the northern edge of medieval Bristol. From 1238 until 1837 a fifteen-day summer fair associated with St James' Priory, one of the largest in England, was partly held in this area, being centred on the St James churchyard. During the eighteenth century the south-east corner of the site was adjacent to St James’s Square, a private Georgian square established c. 1716. After bomb damage from the Bristol Blitz, the surviving terraces fell into rapid decline, and the entire square was demolished during the 1960s redevelopment programme that created the present roundabout that is named after the original area. The modern nickname "Bearpit" is first attested among city street sweeping staff in the 1970s and refers to the sunken, amphitheatre-like plan of the post-war junction that resembled a zoo's bear enclosure.

=== Construction of the roundabout (1960s) ===
The grade-separated roundabout was built during the wholesale redevelopment of Bristol’s post-blitz central area and was a major component of the planned Inner Circuit Road. Approved in 1964, it opened in 1967–68 at a reported cost of £900,000 and incorporated below-grade pedestrian subways and an inner sunken garden of hexagonal flower beds.

Construction required the clearance of the damaged houses of St James’s Square together with adjoining streets such as Cumberland Street and Ashley Street. The new junction, officially St James Barton roundabout, replaced the razed Georgian square with a concrete pedestrian area one-third below street level, in line with contemporary traffic-engineering ideas that favoured vertical segregation of vehicles and pedestrians. The redevelopment thus obstructed the long-established pedestrian routes between Broadmead and St Paul's.

=== Community initiatives and trading (2010–2018) ===
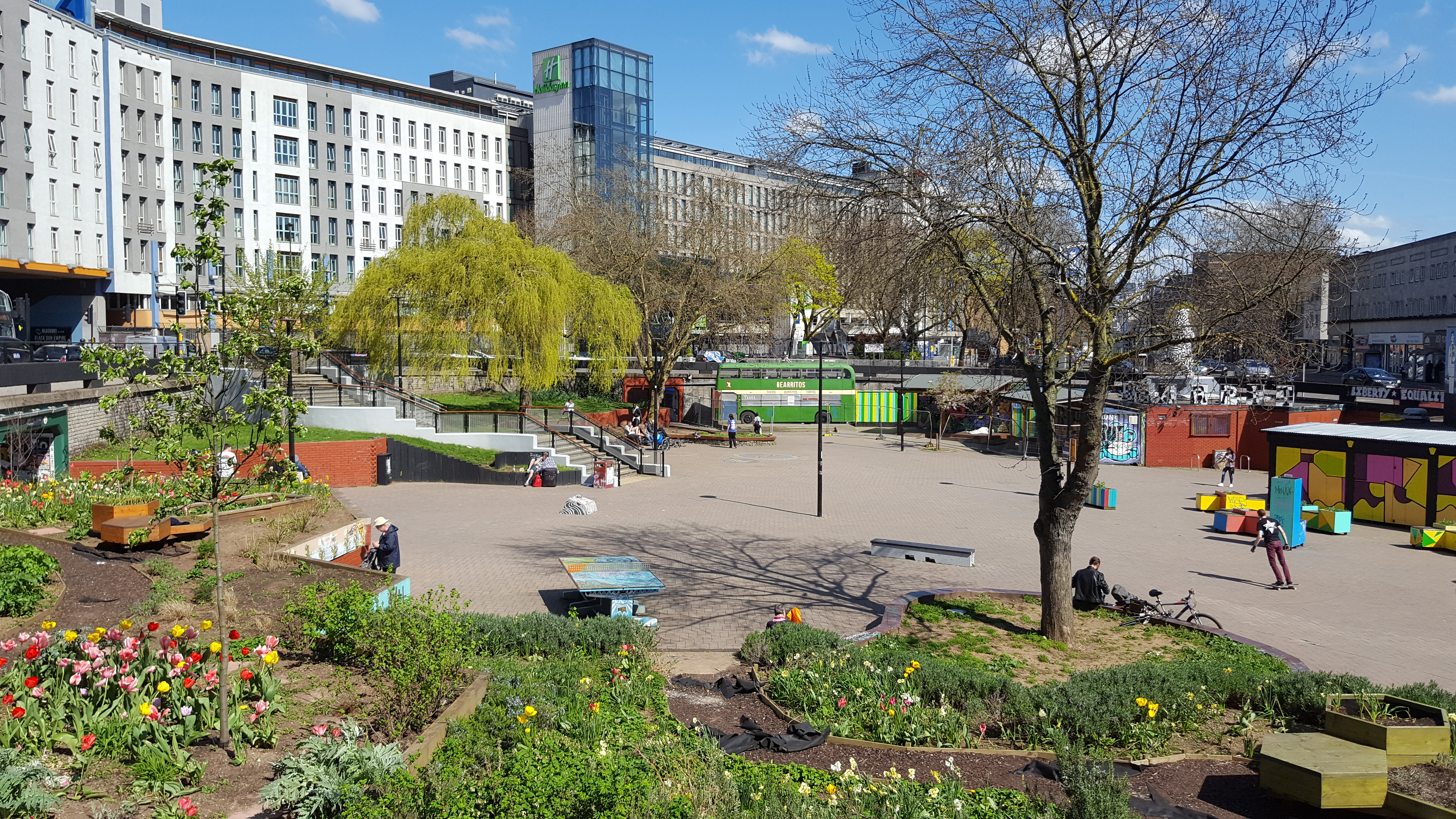
The Bearpit in 2018 with installations by the People's Republic of Stokes Croft and remnants of its original hexagonal layout.

In 2010 local residents, artists and traders created the Bearpit Improvement Group (BIG), the first UK "community action group" to receive a council licence giving semi-autonomous control of a city space classed as a "community action zone". BIG’s nine volunteer directors set out to make the pit "welcoming, safe, diverse and inclusive" through five work-streams: trade, art, play, greening, and heritage. By the early 2010s the Bearpit had nevertheless gained a reputation for crime and anti-social behaviour; in a 2011 public poll it was voted "the worst area in Bristol". In response to safety concerns regarding the pedestrian subways, the roadway around the north and west of the roundabout was narrowed by one lane, and a new at-grade pedestrian and cycle route was created at a cost of £1 million in 2012. Later in 2012, Bristol City Council issued community licences to BIG and the People's Republic of Stokes Croft (PRSC) to improve the space through art, markets and small-scale catering. Projects included the installation of shipping-container kiosks, the opening of the "Bearpit Social" café and, in May 2013, Ursa, a 12-foot timber bear sculpture. To increase trading activity, the newly formed Bearpit Bristol CIC secured a £112,000 social-impact loan from Resonance in late 2016, earmarked for training local people and extending opening hours. Volunteer "greening" schemes and public events such as the Bearpit Banquet in 2016 temporarily improved perceptions of safety and reduced recorded crime.

=== Escalation of safety concerns and 2019 eviction ===
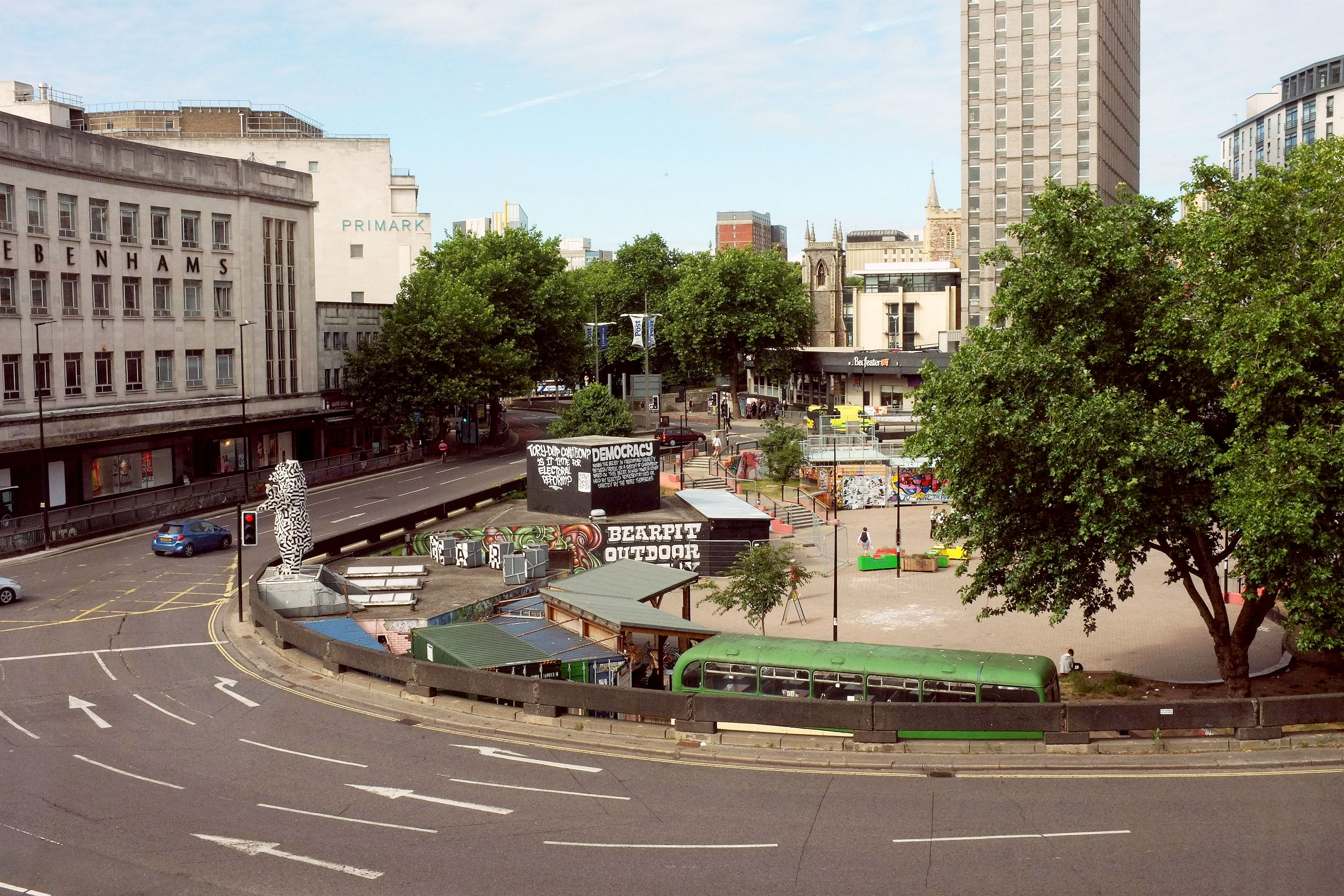
The Bearpit in 2017 viewed from the east.

Rising street homelessness and the arrival of the synthetic cannabinoid "spice" led to more than 120 police-recorded incidents of disorder in 2016 and mounting pressure from nearby businesses. In response a multi-agency stakeholder group, comprising the council, police, BIG traders, hotels and outreach charities, was convened in 2015 to coordinate enforcement and welfare interventions. From late 2017 a further rise in drug-related assaults prompted traders and mayor Marvin Rees to describe the environment as "dangerous and toxic". After a short-lived occupation of the kiosks by homeless squatters, Bristol City Council closed the site on 19 June 2019 and undertook a £250,000 clearance and deep-clean, fencing off the pit and removing all containers and street furniture. PRSC criticised the demolition of its structures as wasteful and contrary to prior agreements with the council. Ursa was dismantled and placed in storage in September 2019.

The roundabout reopened to pedestrians on 26 July 2019 after five weeks’ closure, newly painted and with surveillance cameras and additional lighting installed.

=== Proposed redevelopment ===
In 2018, former traders unveiled "The Circle", a food-focused circular-economy hub that would deck over part of the pit and incorporate urban agriculture, independent eateries, and community facilities at a cost of £3.5 million. As of 2025 the scheme remains unimplemented and Bristol City Council has not announced a definitive long-term plan for the site. In 2026, construction of St James House began. Once constructed, the complex will consist of two 28 and 18-storey buildings, with the former becoming Bristol's tallest building.

== Local area ==
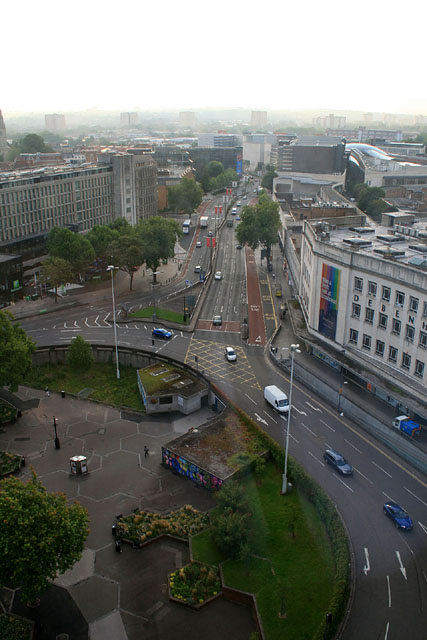
View of the Bearpit in 2011 from the Premier Inn at Avon House, looking toward Bond Street and Cabot Circus. The pre-renovation, hexagonal layout is fully evident here.

The roundabout forms the meeting-point of several central Bristol districts:

- West – The cleared site of the former Avon House is being prepared for a mixed-use tower known as St James House; demolition work began in October 2024. Immediately beyond lies Bristol bus station (opened 1958, rebuilt 2006), which has footpaths that directly connect to the Bearpit's subways.
- South and south-east – The junction is fronted by the western end of the Broadmead retail area; a large building formerly occupied by Debenhams overlooks the junction, alongside the current Primark on the Horsefair.
- North – Next to the A38 begins the inner-city suburb of St Paul's. In the vicinity of Stokes Croft and Marlborough Street stand eight purpose-built student accommodation blocks that together provide almost 2,500 bedrooms. This is also the location of the Holiday Inn, which alongside Avon House once served as administrative offices for Avon County Council.
- East – The first section of the M32 channels regional traffic directly onto St James Barton via the A4044, giving it a major role for dispersing road users entering the city.

The Bristol Cable has described this close proximity of high-value retail, student housing and motorway infrastructure to a space long associated with rough-sleeping and informal trading as "an exaggerated microcosm of some of the city’s growing social divisions".

== See also ==
- St James' Priory, for additional information on the history of the surrounding area in the medieval and early modern periods.
- 20th century road schemes in Bristol, for additional information on the development of major arterial roads in Bristol contemporaneous with the Bearpit.
- Ursa the Bear, the statue of a bear that once stood in the Bearpit and caused local controversy due to its dismantling and removal.
