= St James House, Bristol =

High-Rise Building under construction in Bristol, England

Coordinates: 51.4591°N 2.5917°W

St James House
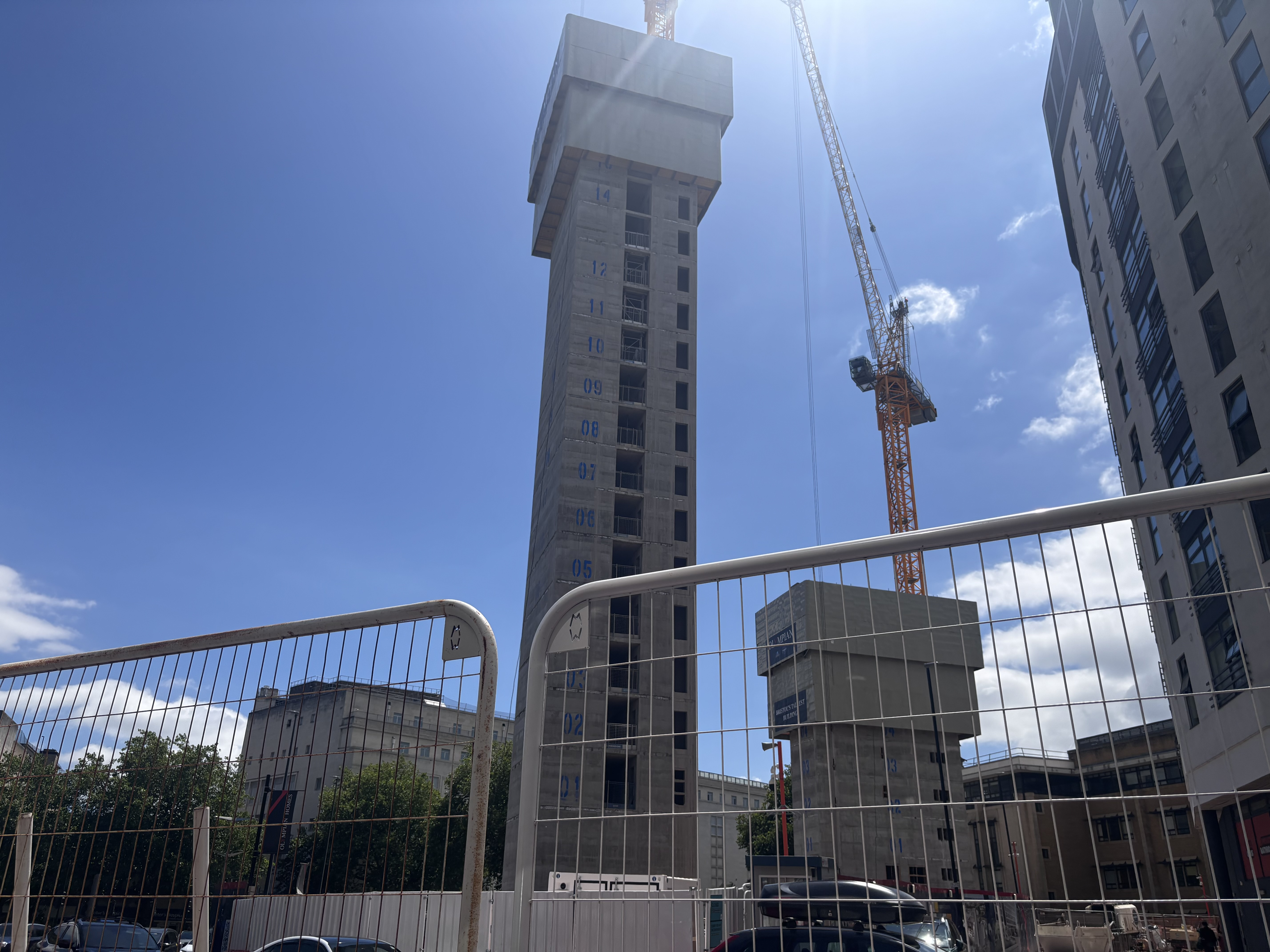
- The Building in 2026
- Interactive map of the St James House area

General information
- Status: Under construction
- Type: Purpose-built student accommodation
- Location: The Bearpit, Bristol, England
- Construction started: 2026
- Estimated completion: 2028

Height
- Height: 108 m (354 ft)

Technical details
- Floor count: 28

St James House is a high-rise student accommodation building under construction at St James Barton in Bristol, England. It forms part of a wider development also comprising an 18-storey co-living building. The development is being built on the site of the former Premier Inn at Haymarket, located in The Bearpit, Bristol.

The 28-storey tower is designed to contain 442 student bedrooms and is expected to become the tallest building in Bristol, surpassing the 26-storey Castle Park View. The building was designed by Hodder + Partners and is being developed by Olympian Homes, and is planned to be completed in 2028.

== History ==
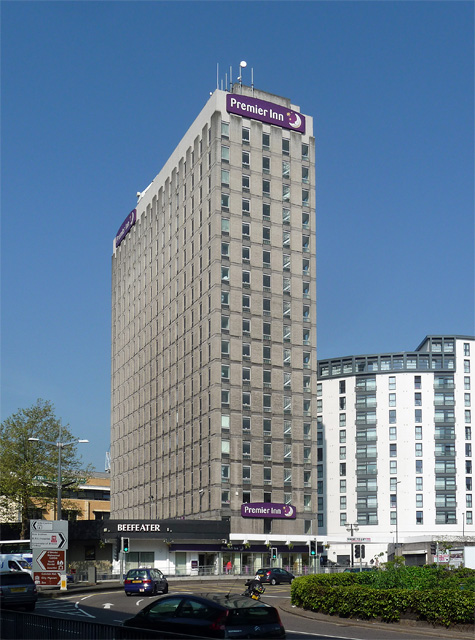
The Premier Inn prior to its 2025 demolition

The site was formerly occupied by the Premier Inn Bristol City Centre, which was originally constructed as an office building. Plans to redevelop the site with two residential towers were submitted to Bristol City Council in 2023. The proposals attracted opposition from conservation groups, particularly because of the height of the proposed tower and its proximity to St James' Priory, Bristol. Bristol City Council granted planning permission in 2024.

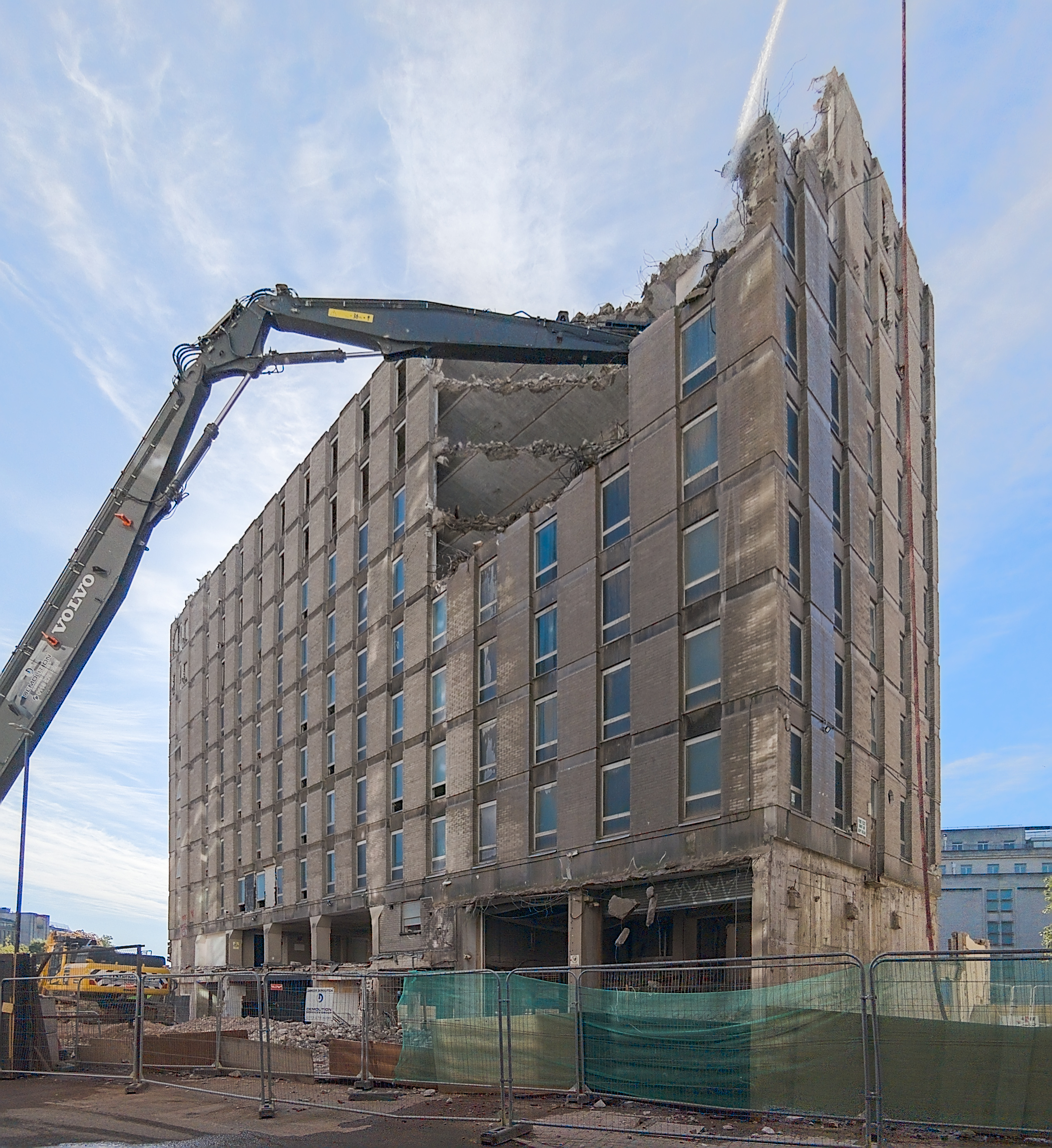
Avon House undergoing demolition in May 2025

The former hotel was demolished between 2024 and 2025. Construction of St James House began in 2026 following approval.

== Architecture ==
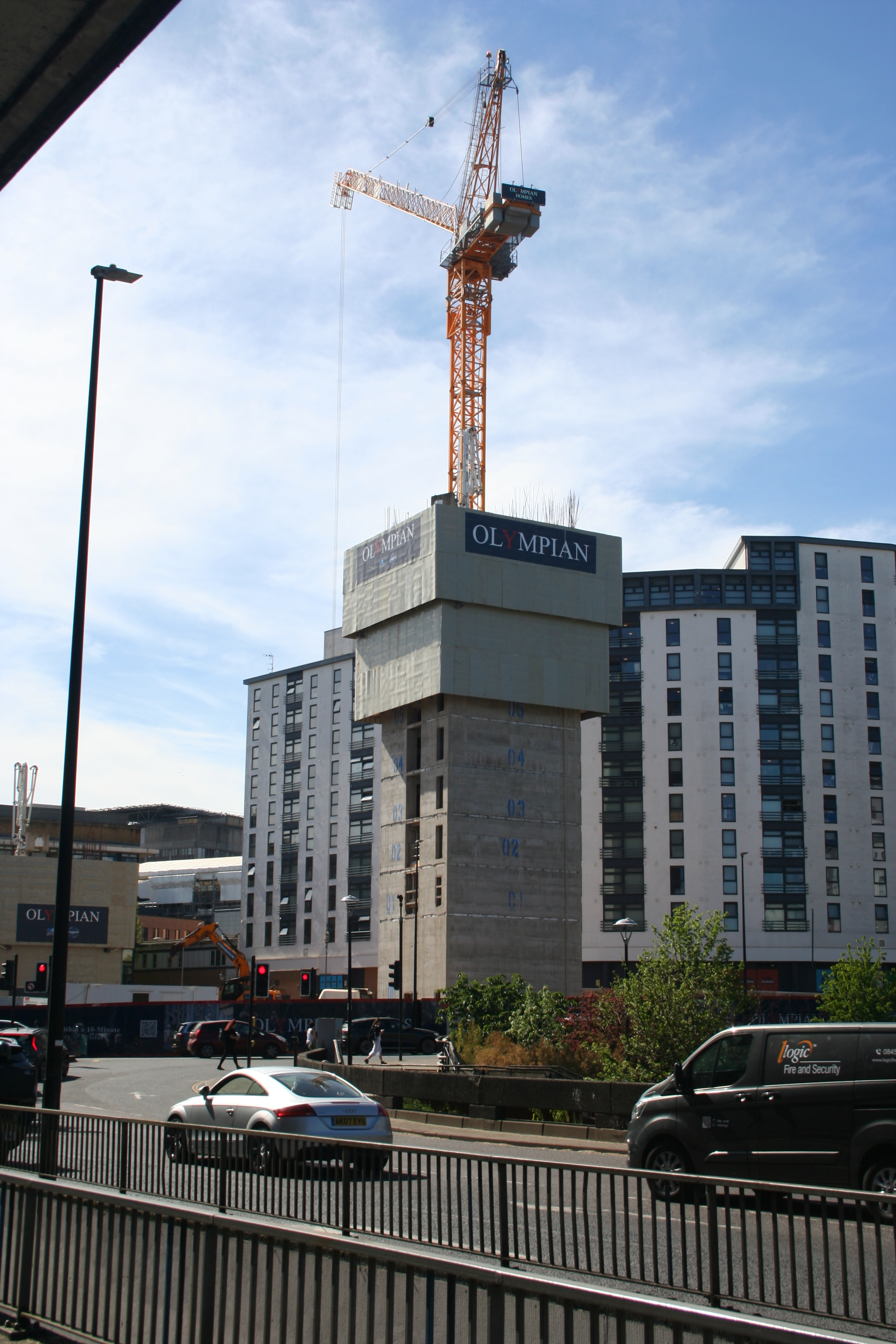
The tower under construction in April 2026

Once completed, St James House will be 28 storeys tall and will function primarily as purpose-built student accommodation. The wider development will include several communal facilities, landscaped public space and pedestrian connections around Haymarket. The tower is expected to reach approximately 102 metres (335 ft), making it taller than Castle Park View, which stands at 86.6 metres (284 ft). The building is expected to be completed in 2028.
