= Avon House, Bristol =

County building in Bristol, England

Avon House
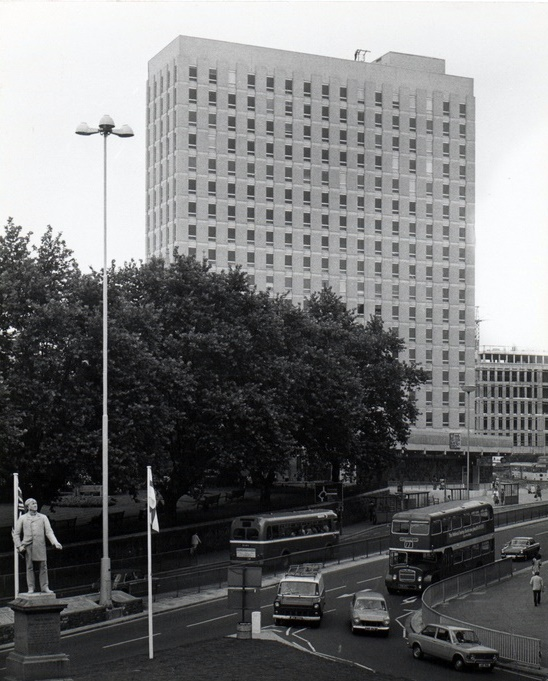
- Seen from St James Place

- Location within Bristol

General information
- Status: Demolished
- Architectural style: international style
- Location: St. James Barton, Bristol, UK
- Coordinates: 51.459°N 2.592°W
- Construction started: 1969
- Completed: 1972
- Renovated: 2004
- Demolished: 2024

Height
- Height: 60 m (200 ft)

Technical details
- Floor count: 18

Avon House was an 18-storey building, one of the tallest structures in central Bristol, England. It was situated adjacent to The Bearpit roundabout. Opened in 1972, it first served as offices for Avon County Council, it was later converted to a hotel, the Premier Inn Bristol City Centre Haymarket Hotel, which closed in 2024 and was demolished in 2025 for redevelopment of the site as student flats.

== History ==
The building formed part of an initiative in the 1960s by Bristol City Council to redevelop the St. James Barton area which had been badly damaged by bombing during the Bristol Blitz of the Second World War and had remained semi derelict since the end of the war.

Planning permission was given for a tall building in the international style in 1967 and the construction work took place between 1969 and 1972. The design involved an 18-storey building (a two-storey podium with shops, a church hall and a public house together with a 16-storey tower), which was 60 metres (200 ft) high, on the corner of Marlborough Street and the Haymarket at the Bearpit Roundabout; the original access was through a doorway on the ground floor of the Haymarket elevation: the tower was 16 bays across on the Haymarket elevation and five bays across on the Bearpit Roundabout elevation. The visual impact of the scheme was criticised by English Heritage who said that "it was bulk rather than height that damaged the skyline."

Avon House was built speculatively but was occupied by Avon County Council when it was formed in April 1974. In 1987, when the television presenter, Caron Keating, visited Bristol to launch the Christmas carnival procession, she joined three dwarves in abseiling down the face of Avon House, as part of a fund raising initiative in support of the Bristol Royal Hospital for Children.

After Avon County Council was abolished in 1996 the building was used as workspace by Bristol City Council staff for a few years before it became redundant. It was converted into a hotel in 1999 and was subsequently rebranded as a Premier Inn.

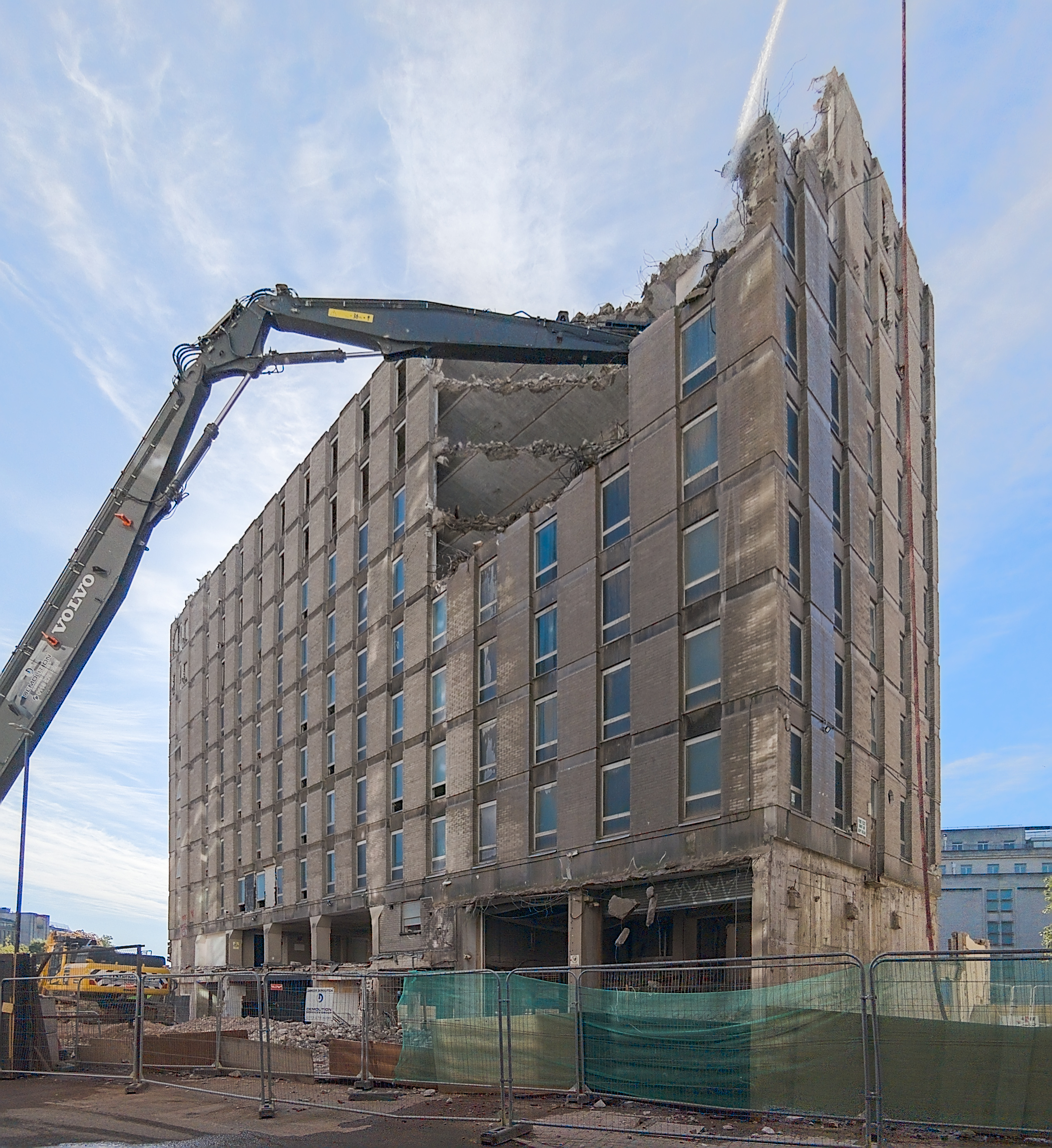
Avon House undergoing demolition in May 2025

In 2023, Premier Inn owner Whitbread announced proposals to close the hotel and demolish the building. The redevelopment, St James House, will consist of a 28-storey building and an 18-storey building. The 28-storey building will be the tallest in Bristol. Planning permission for the new development was granted in March 2024. The Premier Inn closed in May 2024, with demolition commencing in October and completed by June 2025.

== See also ==
- List of tallest buildings and structures in Bristol
