= Ursa the Bear =

Public sculpture formerly installed in Bristol, England

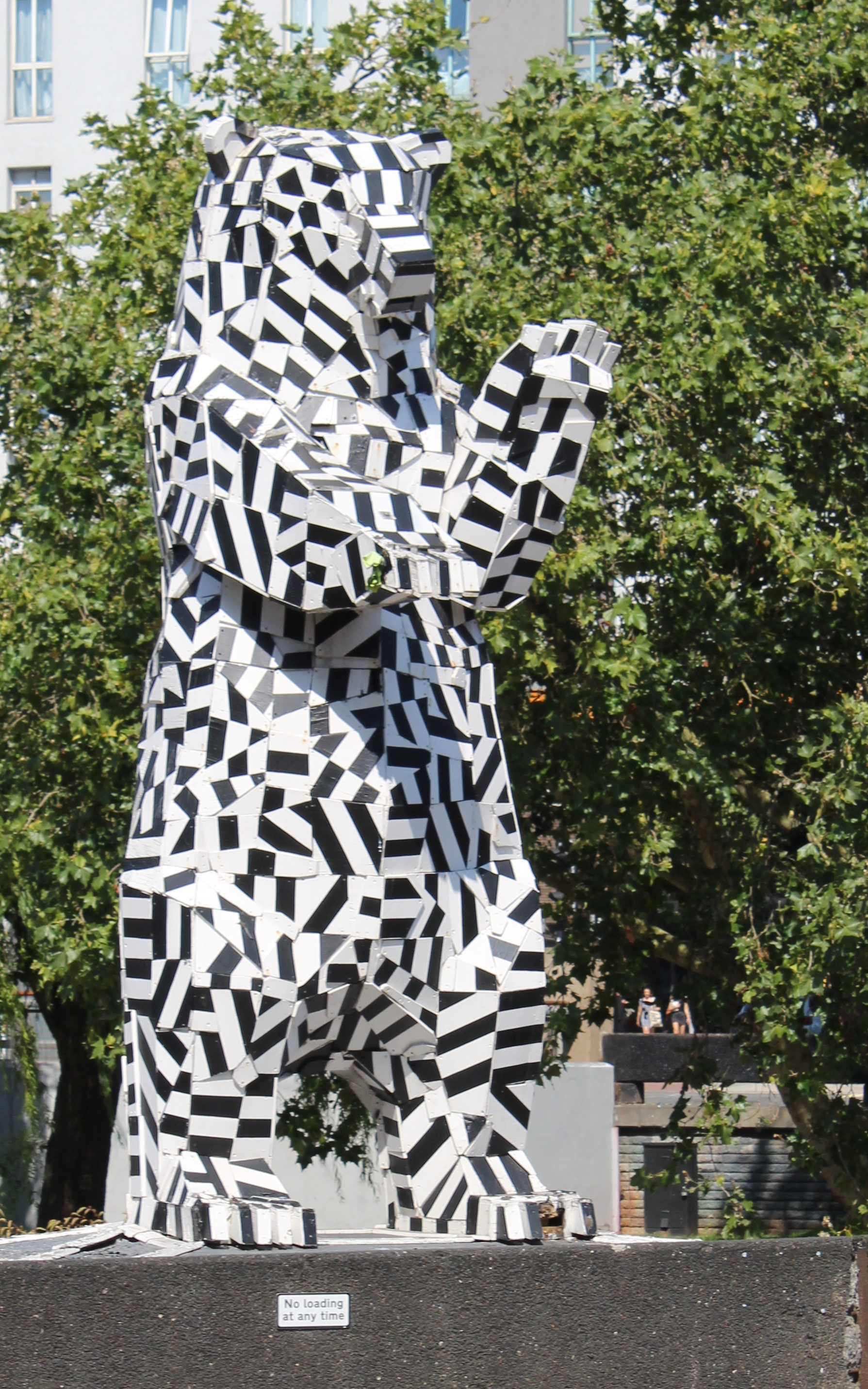
- Ursa on the roof of the former men’s lavatories in the Bearpit, June 2019
- Artist: Jamie Gillman
- Year: 2013
- Type: Sculpture
- Medium: Reclaimed timber and paint
- Movement: Community art
- Subject: European brown bear
- Dimensions: 12 ft (3.7 m) tall
- Condition: In storage (dismantled September 2019)
- Location: Bristol, England
- 51.459360°N 2.590311°W
- Owner: People’s Republic of Stokes Croft

Ursa the Bear was a 12 ft (3.7 m) tall wooden sculpture of a standing bear created by Bristol-based British artist Jamie Gillman. Commissioned in 2012 by the Bearpit Improvement Group and partly funded by Arts Council England, the black-and-white figure stood on the roof of the disused men’s lavatories in St James Barton, Bristol, from May 2013 until September 2019. During those six years she became one of the city’s best-known pieces of contemporary public art. The sculpture was dismantled and stored after Bristol City Council cleared the site due to public-safety concerns and redevelopment of the area. Ursa later inspired Bristol Bears' 2023–24 away kit and remains the subject of periodic campaigns for her reinstatement to public view.

== History ==
=== Conception and fabrication (2012–2013) ===
Gillman conceived the work as symbolising the independent spirit of Bristol and nearby Stokes Croft and as an anti-gentrification statement. Built from reclaimed construction hoardings, the frame took ten months to assemble and was decorated in alternating painted black-and-white boards. Volunteers removed four tonnes of earth to create a plinth, and the finished statue was winched into position on 10 May 2013, unveiled by then mayor George Ferguson.

=== Landmark and community symbol (2013–2018) ===
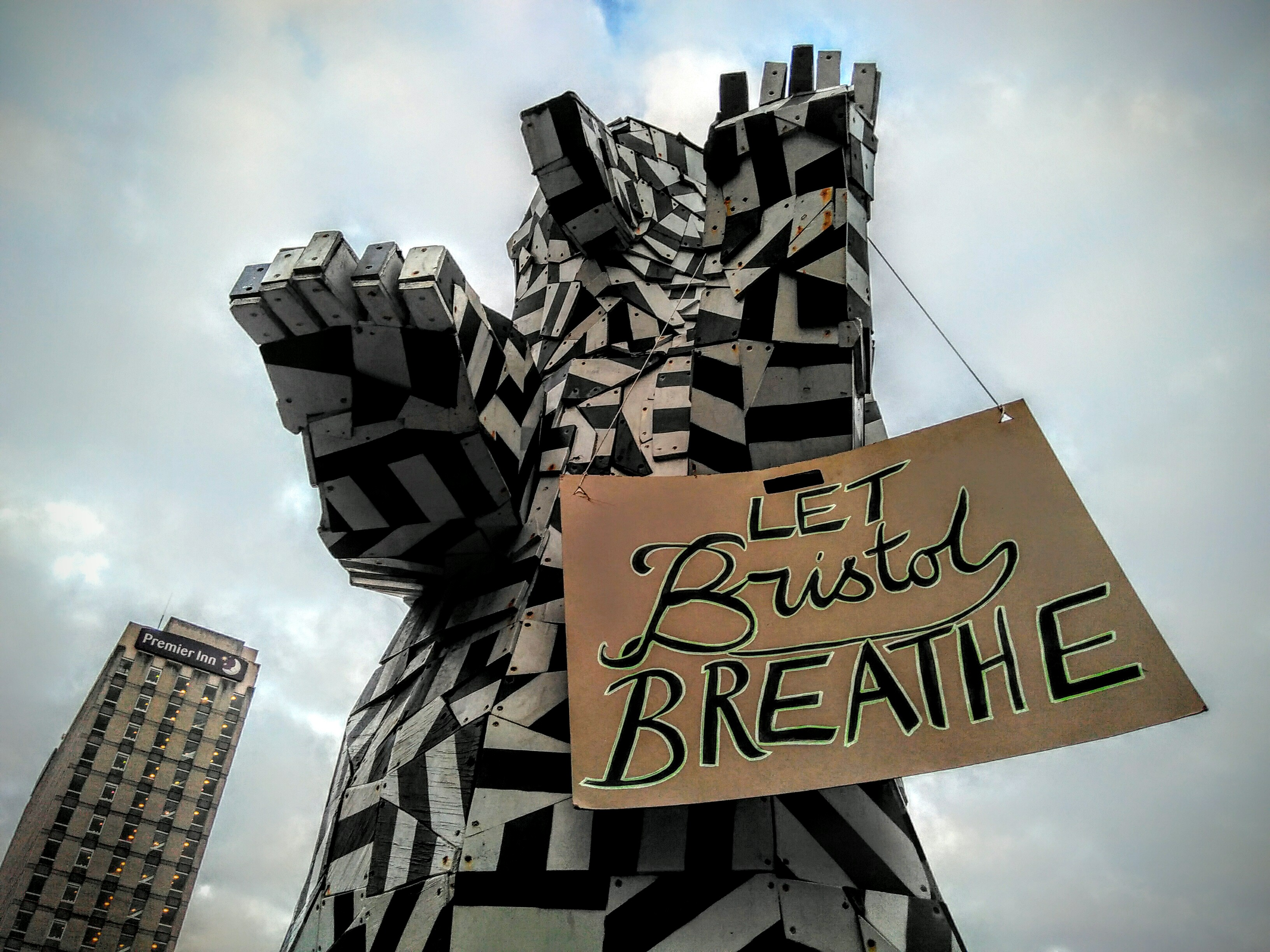
The statue holding a placard for a clean air protest, organised by the Bristol Green Party, 2016.

From its elevated plinth overlooking the A38, Ursa was a recognisable figure and featured on the £B5 Bristol Pound banknote, tourist postcards and merchandising, and in 2018 an online poll for the Naked Guide to Bristol ranked her among the city’s four favourite public sculptures. The sculpture served as a focal point for markets, performances, and protest art organised by the People's Republic of Stokes Croft and local political parties such as the Bristol Green Party. A structural engineer inspected the work annually at no cost.

=== Removal (2018–2019) ===
In October 2018 Bristol City Council terminated PRSC’s licence to occupy the Bearpit and issued legal notices requiring removal of its structures, including Ursa. A petition to keep the statue exceeded 4,000 signatures and triggered a council debate, but Deputy Mayor Asher Craig reiterated that all non-council items had to go. Craig had later stated to media that she received death threats due to her support for the statue's removal. On 26 September 2019 Gillman and PRSC volunteers dismantled the work, which they found to be badly rotted. The remains were moved to the artist’s studio yard for possible restoration. Floral decorations are now present in the site formerly occupied the statue.

== Critical reception ==
Supporters, including petition organiser Caitlin Telfer, argued that Ursa “represents creativity, alternative thinking and freedom of expression.” Green MEP Molly Scott Cato called proposed removal “cultural vandalism”, while a council Twitter poll found almost three-quarters of respondents wanted the bear to stay. Conversely, Labour councillor Mark Brain dismissed the piece as “a pretty mediocre work of art,” and some residents saw the statue as a symbol of the Bearpit’s deteriorating safety. The Bristol Post later described the city as “divided” over the statue's fate.

== Legacy ==
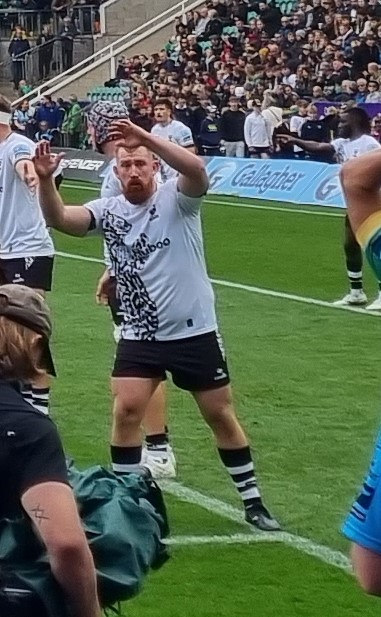
Jake Woolmore, loosehead prop of the Bristol Bears, seen wearing the away kit depicting Ursa in a 2023 Premiership Rugby match versus the Northampton Saints.

Although no permanent new site has been found, the PRSC continues to look for a home for the statue. Gillman has warned that extensive decay in the timber frame may ultimately prevent it from being re-erected. A four-year retrospective in 2023 noted that the removal “left a hole in the heart of the city” and that campaigns to “bring her back” still resurface from time to time.

Merchandise such as graphic prints and mugs of Ursa remain on sale through Gillman’s studio and the PRSC, helping to fund potential restoration efforts. In September 2023 the artist licensed a stylised version of the figure for Bristol Bears rugby club; the motif dominated the club’s 2023–24 O’Neills away kit and related merchandise, taking the image to a national sports audience. Media coverage of the launch again prompted calls from supporters and local councillors for the statue to return to public display.

== See also ==
- The Bearpit, Bristol
- List of public art in Bristol
