= 1993 Avon County Council election =

1993 UK local government election

← 1989	6 May 1993

All 76 seats to Avon County Council 39 seats needed for a majority
	First party	Second party
	Lab	Con
Party	Labour	Conservative
Last election	36 seats, 34.7%	33 seats, 39.2%
Seats won	33	25
Seat change	▼3	▼8
Popular vote	92,983	96,571
Percentage	33.0%	34.2%
Swing	▼1.7%	▼5.0%
	Third party	Fourth party
	LD	Grn
Party	Liberal Democrats	Green
Last election	7 seats, 17.3%	0 seats, 7.8%
Seats won	18	0
Seat change	▲11	Steady
Popular vote	84,061	6,193
Percentage	29.8%	2.2%
Swing	▲12.5%	▼5.6%
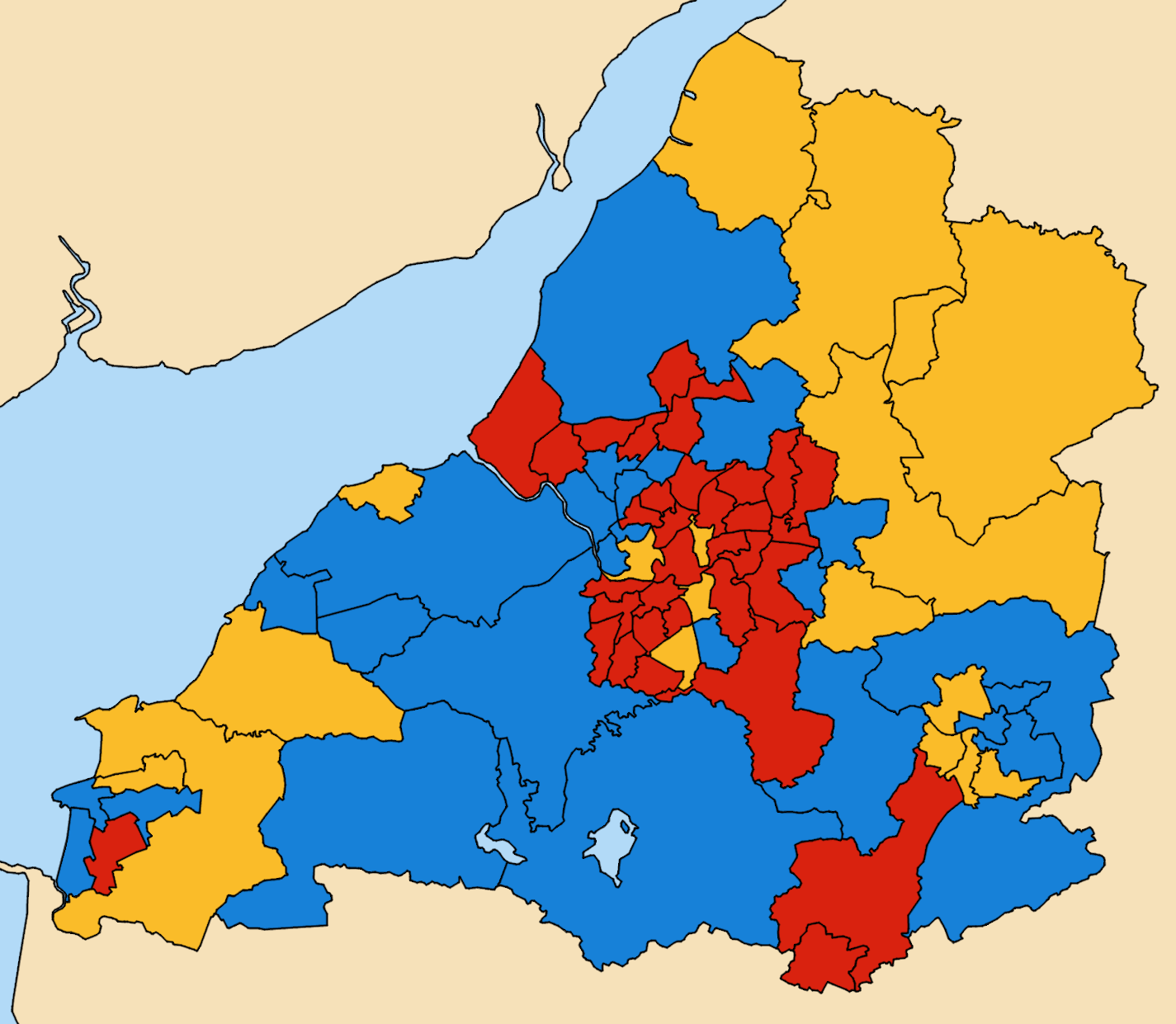
- Map showing the composition of Avon County Council following the election. Blue showing Conservative, Red showing Labour and orange showing Liberal Democrats.
Council control before election
No overall control
Council control after election
No overall control

The 1993 Avon County Council election took place on 6 May 1993 to elect members of Avon County Council in England. This was on the same day as other nationwide local elections. The Liberal Democrats made a number of gains, mainly at the expense of the Conservatives. Labour remained the largest group on the council, but were 6 seats short of gaining a majority.

This was the last election for Avon County, which was abolished in 1996 and replaced with four new unitary authorities: Bath and North East Somerset, Bristol, North Somerset and South Gloucestershire.

== Electoral division results ==
The electoral division results listed below are based on the changes from the 1989 elections, not taking into account any party defections or by-elections. Sitting councillors are marked with an asterisk (*).

=== Ashley ===
Ashley
Party	Candidate	Votes	%	±%
Labour	D. John *	1,416	56.5	+0.8
Liberal Democrats	A. Wilkinson	376	15.0	+5.7
Green	D. Simpson	360	14.4	–5.3
Conservative	J. Eastwood	356	14.2	–1.1
Majority		1,040	41.5	
Turnout			31.5	
Registered electors		7,961		
Labour hold		Swing		

=== Avonmouth ===
Avonmouth
Party	Candidate	Votes	%	±%
Labour	E. Bristow *	2,120	61.6	+2.9
Conservative	N. Tolchard	955	27.8	–7.4
Liberal Democrats	P. Lloyd	366	10.6	N/A
Majority		1,165	33.9	
Turnout			46.2	
Registered electors		7,443		
Labour hold		Swing		

=== Bath Central ===
Bath Central
Party	Candidate	Votes	%	±%
Conservative	M. Wheadon *	1,273	40.6	–6.4
Liberal Democrats	K. Keenan	1,205	38.4	+24.8
Labour	M. Davis	516	16.5	–4.9
Green	J. Risbridger	140	4.5	–13.5
Majority		68	2.2	
Turnout			35.5	
Registered electors		8,825		
Conservative hold		Swing		

=== Bath North East ===
Bath North East
Party	Candidate	Votes	%	±%
Conservative	L. Price *	1,275	36.9	–3.8
Liberal Democrats	K. Lunt	1,213	35.1	+20.8
Labour	B. Barrett	810	23.5	–9.9
Green	J. Rust	155	4.5	–7.1
Majority		62	1.8	
Turnout			42.7	
Registered electors		8,089		
Conservative hold		Swing		

=== Bath North West ===
Bath North West
Party	Candidate	Votes	%	±%
Liberal Democrats	R. Allan	2,256	47.4	+10.8
Conservative	I. Dewey *	1,971	41.4	–4.4
Labour	P. Sas	362	7.6	–1.6
Green	S. Bradley	169	3.6	–4.8
Majority		285	6.0	
Turnout			50.0	
Registered electors		9,519		
Liberal Democrats gain from Conservative		Swing		

=== Bath South ===
Bath South
Party	Candidate	Votes	%	±%
Liberal Democrats	J. Willetts	1,992	49.2	+18.5
Conservative	M. Adams	1,648	40.7	–5.9
Labour	M. Dodsworth	405	10.0	–5.1
Majority		344	8.5	
Turnout			51.1	
Registered electors		7,923		
Liberal Democrats gain from Conservative		Swing		

=== Bath South East ===
Bath South East
Party	Candidate	Votes	%	±%
Conservative	B. Pascoe *	1,436	45.4	–6.7
Liberal Democrats	B. Bodle	1,415	44.7	+28.4
Labour	J. Campbell	315	9.9	+0.7
Majority		21	0.7	
Turnout			37.5	
Registered electors		8,436		
Conservative hold		Swing		

=== Bath South West ===
Bath South West
Party	Candidate	Votes	%	±%
Liberal Democrats	S. Hogg	1,856	42.0	+26.8
Labour	D. Nicoll *	1,662	37.6	–7.6
Conservative	K. Day	866	19.6	–11.1
Independent	N. Hales	40	0.9	N/A
Majority		194	4.4	
Turnout			45.8	
Registered electors		9,661		
Liberal Democrats gain from Labour		Swing		

=== Bath West ===
Bath West
Party	Candidate	Votes	%	±%
Liberal Democrats	T. Ball	2,568	59.9	+35.5
Labour	S. Lydiard	1,273	29.7	–25.2
Conservative	V. Oliver	372	8.7	–7.1
Green	S. Walker	72	1.7	–3.2
Majority		1,295	30.2	
Turnout			42.9	
Registered electors		9,978		
Liberal Democrats gain from Labour		Swing		

=== Bathavon ===
Bathavon
Party	Candidate	Votes	%	±%
Conservative	E. Miles *	1,432	43.4	–8.0
Liberal Democrats	G. Buckley	1,396	42.3	+15.3
Labour	H. Strong	469	14.2	+4.7
Majority		36	1.1	
Turnout			40.7	
Registered electors		8,095		
Conservative hold		Swing		

=== Bedminster ===
Bedminster
Party	Candidate	Votes	%	±%
Labour	S. Hodkinson	1,754	60.2	+3.6
Liberal Democrats	R. Hughes	669	22.9	+15.4
Conservative	J. Lopresti	390	13.4	–17.2
Green	A. Lewis	103	3.5	–1.7
Majority		1,085	37.2	
Turnout			34.4	
Registered electors		8,486		
Labour hold		Swing		

=== Bishopston ===
Bishopston
Party	Candidate	Votes	%	±%
Labour	A. Keefe *	1,844	46.6	+7.9
Liberal Democrats	C. Primmett	935	23.6	+1.2
Conservative	W. Brown	886	22.4	–8.1
Independent	P. Miller	147	3.7	N/A
Green	J. Quinnell	146	3.7	–4.8
Majority		909	23.0	
Turnout			45.2	
Registered electors		8,758		
Labour hold		Swing		

=== Bishopsworth ===
Bishopsworth
Party	Candidate	Votes	%	±%
Labour	P. Dunmore *	1,656	52.5	+0.9
Conservative	M. Jarrett	1,114	35.3	–1.5
Liberal Democrats	M. Sykes	295	9.4	+5.2
Green	B. Lewis	89	2.8	–0.4
Majority		542	17.2	
Turnout			42.8	
Registered electors		7,375		
Labour hold		Swing		

=== Bitton ===
Bitton
Party	Candidate	Votes	%	±%
Liberal Democrats	C. Downie	2,656	51.6	+9.1
Conservative	P. Formela-Osborne	1,554	30.2	–7.8
Labour	A. Coales	939	18.2	–1.3
Majority		1,102	21.4	
Turnout			46.1	
Registered electors		11,161		
Liberal Democrats hold		Swing		

=== Brislington East ===
Brislington East
Party	Candidate	Votes	%	±%
Labour	W. Martin	1,967	52.8	+2.7
Conservative	C. Bretherton	1,228	32.9	+0.6
Liberal Democrats	J. Freeman	440	11.8	+6.4
Green	D. Eadon	92	2.5	–2.1
Majority		739	19.8	
Turnout			46.1	
Registered electors		8,919		
Labour hold		Swing		

=== Brislington West ===
Brislington West
Party	Candidate	Votes	%	±%
Liberal Democrats	B. Clarke *	1,244	35.6	–10.0
Labour	D. Norris	1,210	34.7	+5.1
Conservative	I. Millard	911	26.1	+1.4
Green	P. Braithwaite	127	3.6	N/A
Majority		34	1.0	
Turnout			42.8	
Registered electors		8,166		
Liberal Democrats hold		Swing		

=== Cabot ===
Cabot
Party	Candidate	Votes	%	±%
Liberal Democrats	S. Williams	1,450	46.7	+11.8
Labour	L. Akehurst	938	30.2	+4.4
Conservative	A. Field-Thorne	560	18.0	–6.9
Green	A. Clarke	158	5.1	–9.3
Majority		512	16.5	
Turnout			35.6	
Registered electors		8,725		
Liberal Democrats hold		Swing		

=== Chew Valley ===
Chew Valley
Party	Candidate	Votes	%	±%
Conservative	A. Telling	2,410	56.5	+3.3
Labour	J. Carter	1,276	29.9	+6.2
Green	S. Scott	577	13.5	+4.6
Majority		1,134	26.6	
Turnout			38.3	
Registered electors		11,133		
Conservative hold		Swing		

=== Clevedon ===
Clevedon
Party	Candidate	Votes	%	±%
Conservative	G. Morris *	1,482	36.8	–7.3
Independent	D. Shopland	1,221	30.3	+2.5
Liberal Democrats	B. Chislett	865	21.5	N/A
Labour	B. Cooper	460	11.4	+1.3
Majority		261	6.5	
Turnout			39.0	
Registered electors		10,337		
Conservative hold		Swing		

=== Clifton ===
Clifton
Party	Candidate	Votes	%	±%
Conservative	M. Withers *	1,434	42.0	–0.6
Liberal Democrats	B. Price	1,270	37.2	+19.7
Labour	N. Steven	545	16.0	–2.0
Green	N. Campion	165	4.8	–14.4
Majority		164	4.8	
Turnout			38.2	
Registered electors		8,939		
Conservative hold		Swing		

=== Cotham ===
Cotham
Party	Candidate	Votes	%	±%
Conservative	P. Cobbold	1,202	35.9	–5.2
Labour	J. Wakeham	1,193	35.6	+9.4
Liberal Democrats	M. Bosel	786	23.5	+9.4
Green	G. Collard	170	5.1	–13.5
Majority		9	0.3	
Turnout			39.6	
Registered electors		8,471		
Conservative hold		Swing		

=== Downend ===
Downend
Party	Candidate	Votes	%	±%
Labour	G. King	2,392	55.4	+10.2
Conservative	G. Wells	1,386	32.1	–9.6
Liberal Democrats	E. Verso	537	12.4	–0.7
Majority		1,006	23.3	
Turnout			44.9	
Registered electors		9,622		
Labour hold		Swing		

=== Easton ===
Easton
Party	Candidate	Votes	%	±%
Liberal Democrats	M. Smith	1,685	52.7	+23.0
Labour	J. Nicholson	1,305	40.8	–11.0
Conservative	I. Vickery	207	6.5	–6.6
Majority		380	11.9	
Turnout			42.1	
Registered electors		7,599		
Liberal Democrats gain from Labour		Swing		

=== Eastville ===
Eastville
Party	Candidate	Votes	%	±%
Labour	S. Lanchbury	1,524	45.7	+1.0
Conservative	S. Vickery	1,293	38.7	–1.1
Liberal Democrats	G. Williams	411	12.3	+4.5
Green	S. Jeffrey	109	3.3	–4.4
Majority		231	6.9	
Turnout			39.7	
Registered electors		8,397		
Labour hold		Swing		

=== Filton ===
Filton
Party	Candidate	Votes	%	±%
Labour	E. Tayler *	2,213	51.1	–2.2
Conservative	A. Castle	1,483	34.2	–12.5
Liberal Democrats	S. Young	634	14.6	N/A
Majority		730	16.9	
Turnout			40.0	
Registered electors		10,828		
Labour hold		Swing		

=== Filwood ===
Filwood
Party	Candidate	Votes	%	±%
Labour	S. Grant *	1,087	74.7	–5.3
Conservative	C. Simpson	166	11.4	–1.2
Liberal Democrats	J. Knight	152	10.4	+5.7
Green	J. Edmunds	51	3.5	+0.7
Majority		921	63.3	
Turnout			21.5	
Registered electors		6,775		
Labour hold		Swing		

=== Frome Vale ===
Frome Vale
Party	Candidate	Votes	%	±%
Labour	A. Becker	2,198	53.1	–1.4
Conservative	V. Eaglestone	1,415	34.2	+1.5
Liberal Democrats	R. Windmill	528	12.8	+7.0
Majority		783	18.9	
Turnout			45.8	
Registered electors		9,037		
Labour hold		Swing		

=== Gordano Valley ===
Gordano Valley
Party	Candidate	Votes	%	±%
Conservative	P. Burden	1,863	48.0	–9.9
Labour	J. Clark	1,412	36.4	+22.7
Liberal Democrats	J. Morgan	608	15.7	–1.2
Majority		451	11.6	
Turnout			38.1	
Registered electors		10,190		
Conservative hold		Swing		

=== Hartcliffe ===
Hartcliffe
Party	Candidate	Votes	%	±%
Labour	B. Chalmers *	1,412	59.4	–0.8
Conservative	D. Robinson	561	23.6	–4.0
Liberal Democrats	J. Grant	332	14.0	+6.8
Green	C. Bolton	73	3.1	–1.8
Majority		851	35.8	
Turnout			29.0	
Registered electors		8,198		
Labour hold		Swing		

=== Henbury ===
Henbury
Party	Candidate	Votes	%	±%
Labour	R Pyle	1,872	52.7	+1.9
Conservative	A. Low	1,233	34.7	–2.1
Liberal Democrats	J Taylor	447	12.6	+4.2
Majority		639	18.0	
Turnout			46.1	
Registered electors		7,701		
Labour hold		Swing		

=== Hengrove ===
Hengrove
Party	Candidate	Votes	%	±%
Liberal Democrats	J. Webb *	2,508	59.1	+21.3
Conservative	S. Willis	938	22.1	–11.3
Labour	R. Lomas	740	17.4	–8.7
Green	G. Davey	56	1.3	–1.4
Majority		1,570	37.0	
Turnout			41.8	
Registered electors		10,138		
Liberal Democrats hold		Swing		

=== Henleaze ===
Henleaze
Party	Candidate	Votes	%	±%
Conservative	J. Portch *	2,021	49.1	–9.1
Liberal Democrats	R. Brown	1,436	34.9	+20.2
Labour	K. Evans	482	11.7	–0.6
Green	D. Wall	154	3.7	+1.0
Independent	S Carter	20	0.5	N/A
Majority		585	14.2	
Turnout			47.7	
Registered electors		8,615		
Conservative hold		Swing		

=== Hillfields ===
Hillfields
Party	Candidate	Votes	%	±%
Labour	J. Marshall *	1,618	60.0	+2.6
Conservative	J. Wilkins	621	23.0	–5.4
Liberal Democrats	S. Hender	459	17.0	+12.3
Majority		997	37.0	
Turnout			34.0	
Registered electors		7,930		
Labour hold		Swing		

=== Horfield ===
Horfield
Party	Candidate	Votes	%	±%
Conservative	J. Reed *	1,509	43.9	–0.7
Labour	M. Richardson	1,426	41.5	–0.6
Liberal Democrats	R. Hollyman	483	14.1	+5.2
Green	P. Scott	18	0.5	–3.9
Majority		83	2.4	
Turnout			44.1	
Registered electors		7,793		
Conservative hold		Swing		

=== Keynsham East ===
Keynsham East
Party	Candidate	Votes	%	±%
Conservative	K Nicholls *	2,178	57.0	–0.4
Liberal Democrats	G. Roberts	1,200	31.4	+3.7
Labour	A. Buckle	446	11.7	–3.2
Majority		978	25.6	
Turnout			41.3	
Registered electors		9,257		
Conservative hold		Swing		

=== Keynsham West ===
Keynsham West
Party	Candidate	Votes	%	±%
Labour	J. Lingard *	2,014	47.0	–8.4
Conservative	R. Abram	1,377	32.1	+4.6
Liberal Democrats	A. Crouch	898	20.9	+12.8
Majority		637	14.9	
Turnout			44.8	
Registered electors		9,573		
Labour hold		Swing		

=== Kings Chase ===
Kings Chase
Party	Candidate	Votes	%	±%
Labour	T. Walker *	1,979	66.5	+2.1
Conservative	F. Birch	610	20.5	–7.0
Liberal Democrats	P. Barrow	388	13.0	+4.9
Majority		1,369	46.0	
Turnout			36.0	
Registered electors		8,271		
Labour hold		Swing		

=== Kingsweston ===
Kingsweston
Party	Candidate	Votes	%	±%
Labour	K. Walker *	1,848	57.2	+5.2
Conservative	J. Veale	984	30.5	–6.0
Liberal Democrats	F. Young	397	12.3	+5.6
Majority		864	26.8	
Turnout			41.8	
Registered electors		7,732		
Labour hold		Swing		

=== Knowle ===
Knowle
Party	Candidate	Votes	%	±%
Labour	V. Davey *	1,629	61.2	+2.9
Conservative	T. Skipp	667	25.1	–3.4
Liberal Democrats	D. Gammon	200	7.5	–0.2
Green	J. Barraclough	164	6.2	+0.7
Majority		962	36.2	
Turnout			35.8	
Registered electors		7,438		
Labour hold		Swing		

=== Ladden Brook ===
Ladden Brook
Party	Candidate	Votes	%	±%
Liberal Democrats	P. Hockey *	2,471	51.9	–3.4
Conservative	D. Moss	1,624	34.1	–0.6
Labour	R. Millard	510	10.7	+0.7
Green	B. Iles	159	3.3	N/A
Majority		847	17.8	
Turnout			45.0	
Registered electors		10,585		
Liberal Democrats hold		Swing		

=== Lawrence Hill ===
Lawrence Hill
Party	Candidate	Votes	%	±%
Labour	T. Turvey *	1,793	70.2	–2.7
Conservative	H. Richmond	344	13.5	–0.1
Liberal Democrats	A. Geoghegan	326	12.8	+8.1
Independent	J. Lamb	92	3.6	N/A
Majority		1,449	56.7	
Turnout			29.2	
Registered electors		8,764		
Labour hold		Swing		

=== Lockleaze ===
Lockleaze
Party	Candidate	Votes	%	±%
Labour	P. Boston	1,550	59.0	–7.7
Liberal Democrats	J. Grace	582	22.2	N/A
Conservative	A. Smith	464	17.7	–6.5
Green	J. Duggan	30	1.1	–8.0
Majority		968	36.9	
Turnout			35.8	
Registered electors		7,345		
Labour hold		Swing		

=== Longwell Green ===
Longwell Green
Party	Candidate	Votes	%	±%
Conservative	J. Calway *	2,150	44.3	–1.7
Labour	D. Shannon	1,472	30.3	–9.0
Liberal Democrats	A. Greenfield	1,231	25.4	+10.6
Majority		678	14.0	
Turnout			44.2	
Registered electors		10,992		
Conservative hold		Swing		

=== Midsomer Norton ===
Mindsomer Norton
Party	Candidate	Votes	%	±%
Labour	B. Perry *	2,190	51.8	–3.0
Conservative	S. Steel	1,027	24.3	–7.7
Liberal Democrats	R. Inchley	878	20.8	+14.6
Green	K. Butler	131	3.1	–3.9
Majority		1,163	27.5	
Turnout			35.4	
Registered electors		11,932		
Labour hold		Swing		

=== Mount Hill ===
Mount Hill
Party	Candidate	Votes	%	±%
Labour	S. Hunt *	2,681	55.6	+4.2
Conservative	P. Britton	1,188	24.6	–9.2
Liberal Democrats	M. Hilborne	957	19.8	+11.1
Majority		1,493	30.9	
Turnout			40.1	
Registered electors		12,045		
Labour hold		Swing		

=== Nailsea ===
Nailsea
Party	Candidate	Votes	%	±%
Conservative	A. Barber	1,927	39.9	–11.5
Liberal Democrats	R. Steadman	1,714	35.4	+18.3
Independent	N. Baker	670	13.9	N/A
Labour	D. Mossman	524	10.8	–5.9
Majority		213	4.4	
Turnout			37.4	
Registered electors		12,927		
Conservative hold		Swing		

=== Patchway ===
Patchway
Party	Candidate	Votes	%	±%
Labour	M. Harding	1,550	53.4	–2.8
Liberal Democrats	M. Rossall	694	23.9	+11.5
Conservative	L. Jackson	681	20.0	–6.5
Green	D. Garrett	77	2.7	–2.3
Majority		856	29.5	
Turnout			34.4	
Registered electors		8,438		
Labour hold		Swing		

=== Portishead ===
Portishead
Party	Candidate	Votes	%	±%
Liberal Democrats	G. Crump	2,121	50.3	+11.8
Conservative	J. Walters	1,595	37.8	–7.1
Labour	H. Davies	501	11.9	+1.1
Majority		526	12.5	
Turnout			46.1	
Registered electors		9,146		
Liberal Democrats gain from Conservative		Swing		

=== Priory ===
Priory
Party	Candidate	Votes	%	±%
Liberal Democrats	P. Heath	1,419	45.8	+31.0
Conservative	J. Wyatt *	1,237	39.9	–14.7
Labour	J. Ackroyd	444	14.3	–4.5
Majority		182	5.9	
Turnout			33.6	
Registered electors		9,238		
Liberal Democrats gain from Conservative		Swing		

=== Radstock ===
Radstock
Party	Candidate	Votes	%	±%
Labour	C. Dando *	2,473	55.3	–3.0
Conservative	S. Green	944	21.1	–4.6
Liberal Democrats	B. Wilson	895	20.0	+13.2
Green	M. Boulton	160	3.6	–5.6
Majority		1,529	34.2	
Turnout			33.1	
Registered electors		13,518		
Labour hold		Swing		

=== Redland ===
Redland
Party	Candidate	Votes	%	±%
Labour	J. Ashton	1,478	36.8	+11.1
Conservative	A. Waycott *	1,334	33.3	–12.4
Liberal Democrats	S. Emmett	1,055	26.3	+12.2
Green	N. Whittingham	145	3.6	–10.9
Majority		144	3.6	
Turnout			44.9	
Registered electors		8,931		
Labour gain from Conservative		Swing		

=== Rodway ===
Rodway
Party	Candidate	Votes	%	±%
Labour	M. Bamford *	1,886	52.8	–3.1
Conservative	R. Long	1,148	32.1	–1.1
Liberal Democrats	D. Verso	541	15.1	+4.1
Majority		738	20.6	
Turnout			44.8	
Registered electors		7,976		
Labour hold		Swing		

=== Severn Vale ===
Severn Vale
Party	Candidate	Votes	%	±%
Conservative	W. Fowler *	1,953	43.0	–14.6
Liberal Democrats	P. Tyzack	1,851	40.7	+22.5
Labour	M. Twyman	562	12.4	–4.1
Green	J. Greene	179	3.9	–3.8
Majority		102	2.2	
Turnout			36.2	
Registered electors		12,573		
Conservative hold		Swing		

=== Siston ===
Siston
Party	Candidate	Votes	%	±%
Conservative	M. Hudson *	2,056	48.4	–7.6
Labour	M. McGrath	1,206	28.4	–1.8
Liberal Democrats	J. Parker	985	23.2	+9.4
Majority		850	20.0	
Turnout			43.2	
Registered electors		9,840		
Conservative hold		Swing		

=== Sodbury ===
Sodbury
Party	Candidate	Votes	%	±%
Liberal Democrats	J. Larkins	2,456	50.3	+10.7
Conservative	L. Spiller	1,940	39.8	–5.6
Labour	B. Granger	483	9.9	+1.4
Majority		516	10.6	
Turnout			40.6	
Registered electors		12,017		
Liberal Democrats gain from Conservative		Swing		

=== Southmead ===
Southmead
Party	Candidate	Votes	%	±%
Labour	J. Smith *	1,631	63.3	+4.3
Conservative	B. Jocelyn	626	24.3	–5.1
Liberal Democrats	A. West	321	12.5	+4.6
Majority		1,005	39.0	
Turnout			31.9	
Registered electors		8,087		
Labour hold		Swing		

=== Southville ===
Southville
Party	Candidate	Votes	%	±%
Labour	D. Johnson *	1,670	56.0	+1.3
Conservative	C. Stephenson	724	24.3	–2.4
Liberal Democrats	P. Case	415	13.9	+6.0
Green	R. Martin	131	4.4	+0.7
Independent	E. Booth-Clibborn	41	1.4	N/A
Majority		946	31.7	
Turnout			40.4	
Registered electors		7,377		
Labour hold		Swing		

=== St George East ===
St George East
Party	Candidate	Votes	%	±%
Labour	J. Norris *	1,498	53.3	+2.3
Conservative	J. Bramford	828	29.4	–1.2
Liberal Democrats	G. Draper	486	17.3	+3.8
Majority		670	23.8	
Turnout			33.0	
Registered electors		8,515		
Labour hold		Swing		

=== St George West ===
St George West
Party	Candidate	Votes	%	±%
Labour	R. Stone *	1,910	62.3	+12.1
Liberal Democrats	K. Peacock	747	24.4	–7.0
Conservative	M. Stump	409	13.3	–1.3
Majority		1,163	37.9	
Turnout			39.2	
Registered electors		7,819		
Labour hold		Swing		

=== Stockwood ===
Stockwood
Party	Candidate	Votes	%	±%
Conservative	D. Morris	1,984	45.8	+2.3
Labour	L. Carruthers	1,685	38.9	–7.6
Liberal Democrats	J. Collins	566	13.1	+6.6
Green	C. Presley	95	2.2	–1.3
Majority		299	6.9	
Turnout			43.9	
Registered electors		9,857		
Conservative gain from Labour		Swing		

=== Stoke Bishop ===
Stoke Bishop
Party	Candidate	Votes	%	±%
Conservative	G. Keeley	2,086	56.1	–5.0
Liberal Democrats	E. Carpenter	1,067	28.7	+14.8
Labour	N. Barton	480	12.9	–1.5
Green	L. Hersey	85	2.3	–8.4
Majority		1,019	27.4	
Turnout			38.6	
Registered electors		9,622		
Conservative hold		Swing		

=== The Combe ===
The Combe
Party	Candidate	Votes	%	±%
Conservative	H. Roberts *	2,167	55.1	–6.1
Liberal Democrats	A. Nelson	1,210	30.8	+20.2
Labour	A. Rutherford	555	14.1	–0.3
Majority		957	24.3	
Turnout			37.2	
Registered electors		10,562		
Conservative hold		Swing		

=== Thornbury ===
Thornbury
Party	Candidate	Votes	%	±%
Liberal Democrats	D. Pearce *	2,157	45.2	+4.7
Conservative	R. Gillett	1,978	41.5	+7.4
Labour	M. Harris	437	9.2	+0.6
Green	A. Pinder	198	4.2	N/A
Majority		179	3.8	
Turnout			46.7	
Registered electors		10,209		
Liberal Democrats hold		Swing		

=== Westbury-on-Trym ===
Westbury-on-Trym
Party	Candidate	Votes	%	±%
Conservative	J. Gillard *	2,506	63.5	–2.2
Liberal Democrats	C. Stratton	894	22.7	+7.6
Labour	B. Massey	547	13.9	+2.8
Majority		1,612	40.8	
Turnout			48.6	
Registered electors		8,129		
Conservative hold		Swing		

=== Weston East ===
Weston East
Party	Candidate	Votes	%	±%
Conservative	P. Taylor	1,281	36.7	–10.6
Liberal Democrats	J. Bell	1,134	32.5	N/A
Labour	B. Jennings	1,072	30.7	–5.6
Majority		147	4.2	
Turnout			36.6	
Registered electors		9,532		
Conservative hold		Swing		

=== Weston North ===
Weston North
Party	Candidate	Votes	%	±%
Conservative	D. Greenland *	1,414	42.7	–16.8
Liberal Democrats	R. Martin	1,273	38.5	N/A
Labour	R. Tucker	623	18.8	–2.8
Majority		141	4.3	
Turnout			30.4	
Registered electors		10,892		
Conservative hold		Swing		

=== Weston South ===
Weston South
Party	Candidate	Votes	%	±%
Labour	A. Hughes	1,425	46.4	–8.2
Liberal Democrats	J. Laband	1,165	37.9	N/A
Conservative	J. Dixon	484	15.7	–18.3
Majority		260	8.5	
Turnout			36.6	
Registered electors		8,395		
Labour hold		Swing		

=== Weston West ===
Weston West
Party	Candidate	Votes	%	±%
Conservative	M. Roe	1,580	47.5	–3.1
Liberal Democrats	N. Sycamore	1,200	36.1	+16.6
Labour	G. Board	544	16.4	–1.7
Majority		380	11.4	
Turnout			32.4	
Registered electors		10,268		
Conservative hold		Swing		

=== Whitchurch Park ===
Whitchurch Park
Party	Candidate	Votes	%	±%
Labour	D. Herod	1,320	65.1	–4.8
Conservative	T. Jervis	353	17.4	–1.5
Liberal Democrats	G. Jones	275	13.6	+6.2
Green	B. Hussain	79	3.9	+0.1
Majority		967	47.7	
Turnout			24.9	
Registered electors		8,146		
Labour hold		Swing		

=== Wick ===
Wick
Party	Candidate	Votes	%	±%
Liberal Democrats	D. Webb	1,757	41.1	+13.6
Conservative	M. Radnedge *	1,660	38.8	–6.4
Labour	P. Cooke	859	20.1	–7.2
Majority		97	2.3	
Turnout			45.1	
Registered electors		9,487		
Liberal Democrats gain from Conservative		Swing		

=== Windmill Hill ===
Windmill Hill
Party	Candidate	Votes	%	±%
Labour	M. Chivers	1,573	50.9	–10.7
Conservative	W. Biggs	672	21.8	+0.5
Green	J. Boxall	486	15.7	+5.0
Liberal Democrats	J. Bonham-Carter	358	11.6	+5.9
Majority		901	29.2	
Turnout			32.3	
Registered electors		9,578		
Labour hold		Swing		

=== Winscombe & Wrington Vale ===
Winscombe & Wrington Vale
Party	Candidate	Votes	%	±%
Conservative	J. Forrest	2,152	47.5	–2.7
Liberal Democrats	B. McGrath	1,397	30.9	+13.2
Green	T. Leimdorfer	683	15.1	–11.1
Labour	E. Fowler	294	6.5	+0.5
Majority		755	16.7	
Turnout			40.1	
Registered electors		11,279		
Conservative hold		Swing		

=== Winterbourne ===
Winterbourne
Party	Candidate	Votes	%	±%
Conservative	T. Smith *	2,505	47.9	–8.5
Liberal Democrats	P. Heaney	1,345	25.7	+11.8
Labour	J. Lloyd	1,071	20.5	–1.1
Green	J. Thomas	314	6.0	–2.0
Majority		1,160	22.2	
Turnout			36.1	
Registered electors		14,514		
Conservative hold		Swing		

=== Worle ===
Worle
Party	Candidate	Votes	%	±%
Liberal Democrats	A. Hockridge	2,005	46.9	+25.0
Conservative	E. Harraway	1,534	35.9	–11.1
Labour	J. Davies	739	17.3	–2.7
Majority		471	11.0	
Turnout			32.0	
Registered electors		13,353		
Liberal Democrats gain from Conservative		Swing		

=== Yate ===
Yate
Party	Candidate	Votes	%	±%
Liberal Democrats	M. Drew *	2,602	60.7	+1.4
Conservative	F. Davis	959	22.4	–3.2
Labour	J. Sims	636	14.8	–0.3
Green	K. Styles	93	2.2	N/A
Majority		1,643	38.3	
Turnout			32.1	
Registered electors		13,379		
Liberal Democrats hold		Swing		

=== Yatton & Yeo Moor ===
Yatton & Yeo Moor
Party	Candidate	Votes	%	±%
Liberal Democrats	J. Dagnall	3,004	58.6	+24.6
Conservative	J. Hadley *	1,741	33.9	–8.5
Labour	D. Jenks	384	7.5	–2.4
Majority		1,263	24.6	
Turnout			40.3	
Registered electors		12,727		
Liberal Democrats gain from Conservative		Swing		
