= St James's Fair =

Painting by Samuel Colman

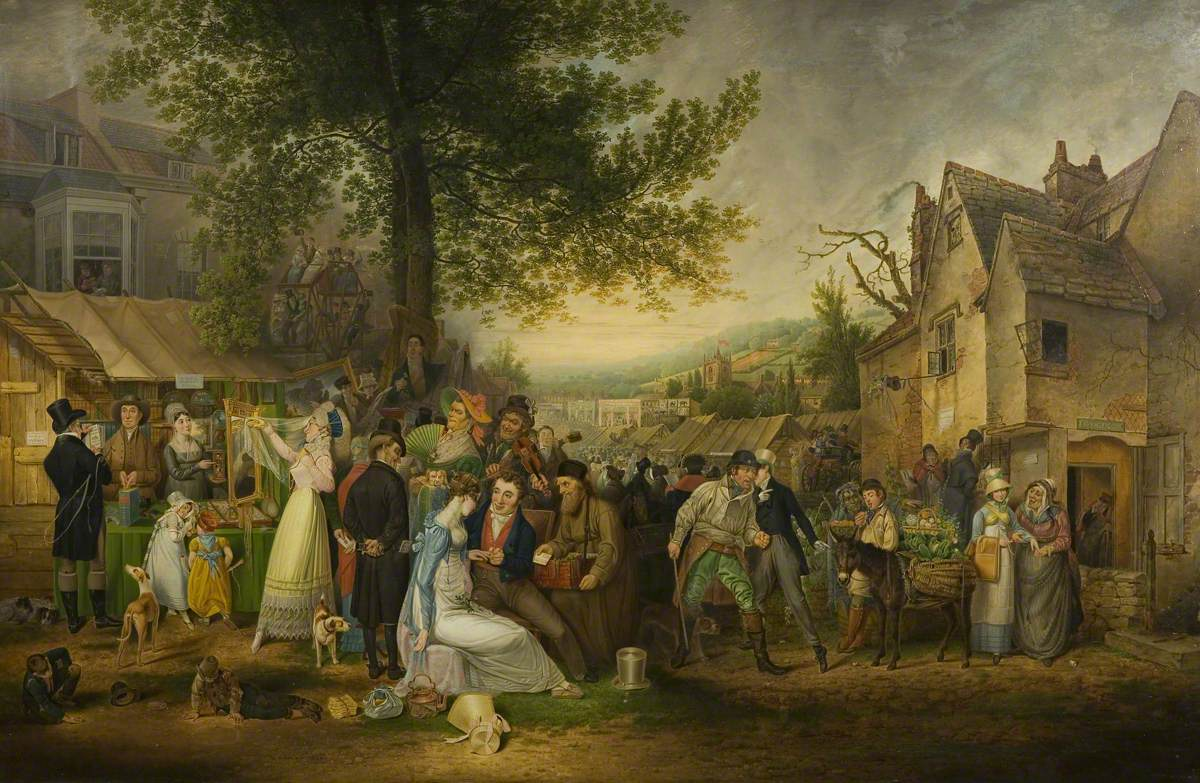
- Artist: Samuel Colman
- Year: 1824
- Type: Oil on panel, genre painting
- Dimensions: 87.6 cm × 133.9 cm (34.5 in × 52.7 in)
- Location: City Museum and Art Gallery; Bristol

St James's Fair is an 1824 genre painting by the British artist Samuel Colman. It depicts the annual fair held since the thirteenth century near St James' Priory in Bristol in the West of England. The scene captures the fair as it looked during the Regency era. Colman, a member of the Bristol School of artists, was a Nonconformist who presents a disapproving of the fair which features elements such as moral corruption and references to slavery. Today the painting is in the City Museum and Art Gallery in Bristol, having been acquired in 1915.

== Bibliography ==
- Carter, Julia. Bristol Museum and Art Gallery: Guide to the Art Collection. Bristol Books, 2017.
- Griffin, Emma. England's Revelry: A History of Popular Sports and Pastimes, 1660-1830. Oxford University Press, 2005.
- Johnson, Edward Dudley Hume. Paintings of the British Social Scene: From Hogarth to Sickert. Weidenfeld and Nicolson, 1986.
