= Samuel Colman (British painter) =

English painter

- Born: 1832
- Died: 1920 (aged 87–88)

Samuel Colman, also Samuel Coleman, (1780 – 21 January 1845) was an English painter, based in Bristol for most of his career.

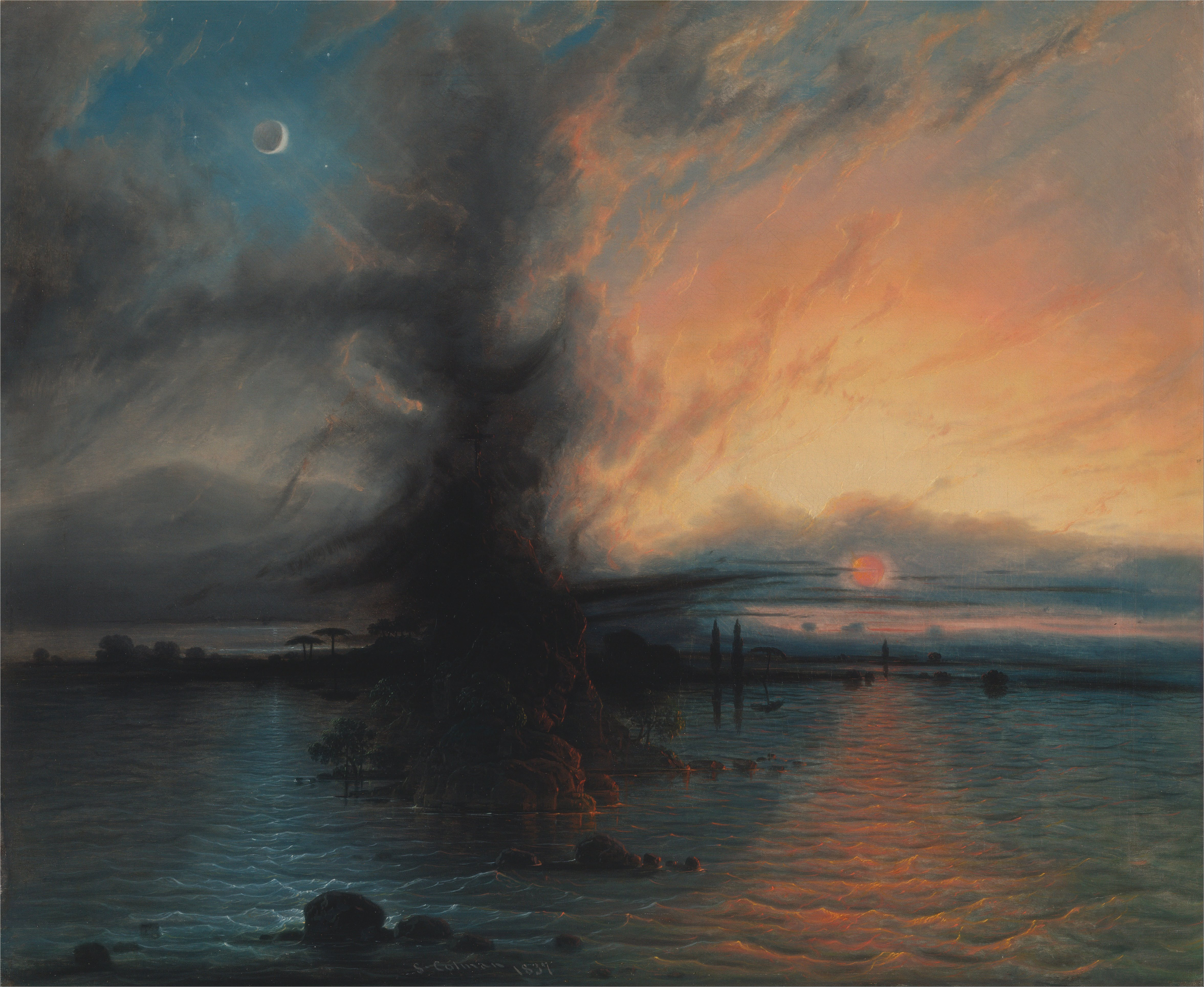
The Rock of Salvation by Samuel Colman, Yale Center for British Art, 1837

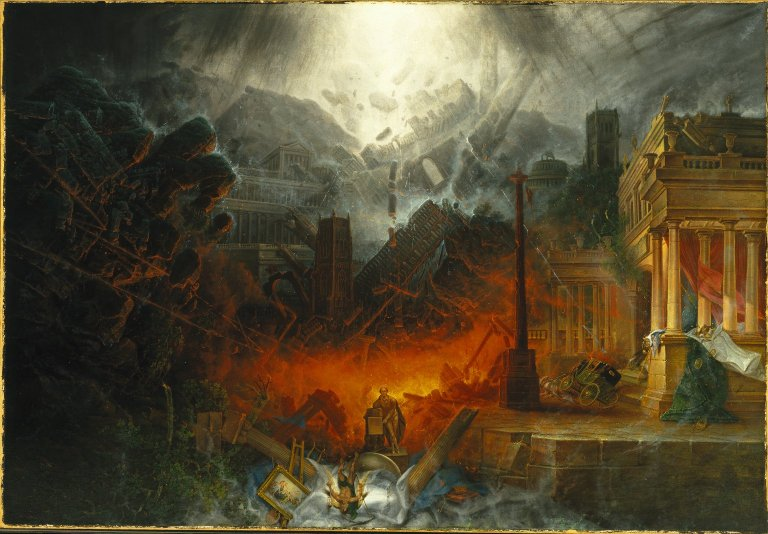
The Edge of Doom, 1836. Brooklyn Museum

== Life ==
In about 1815 Colman moved from Yeovil to Bristol, where he lived until around 1840. He worked as a portrait painter and drawing-master in the city, as well as painting minutely detailed Romantic, Biblical and genre scenes. He was loosely associated with the grouping of artists known as the Bristol School which flourished from the Regency era onwards but had little involvement, although his work nonetheless reflects the genre paintings of Edward Villiers Rippingille and Edward Bird.

He was a religious Nonconformist who worshipped at the Castle Green Independent Chapel and the Zion Chapel in Bedminster, and his faith was central to his work; some of his paintings, such as his The Destruction of the Temple (Tate Gallery), which shows the ruination of a Gothic cathedral, being criticisms of the Church of England. His apocalyptic paintings have drawn comparisons to those of John Martin.

He signed works as Colman and alternatively Coleman.

== Gallery ==
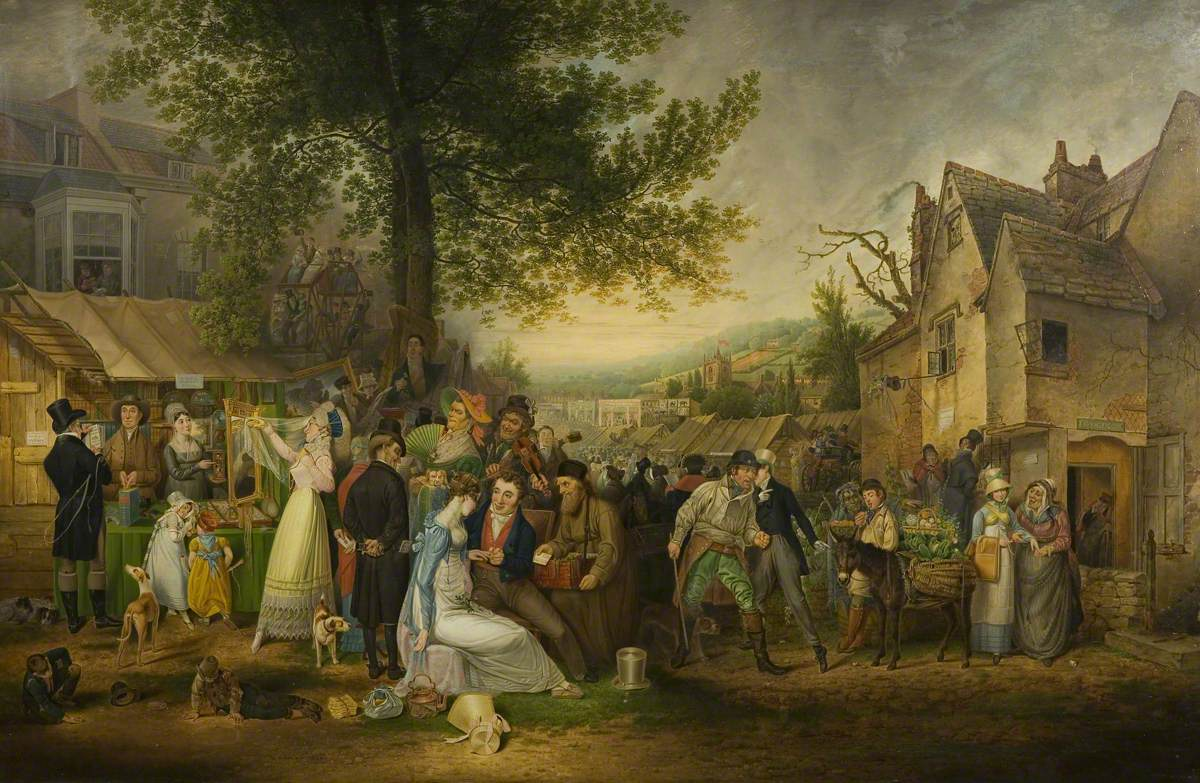
St James's Fair, 1824

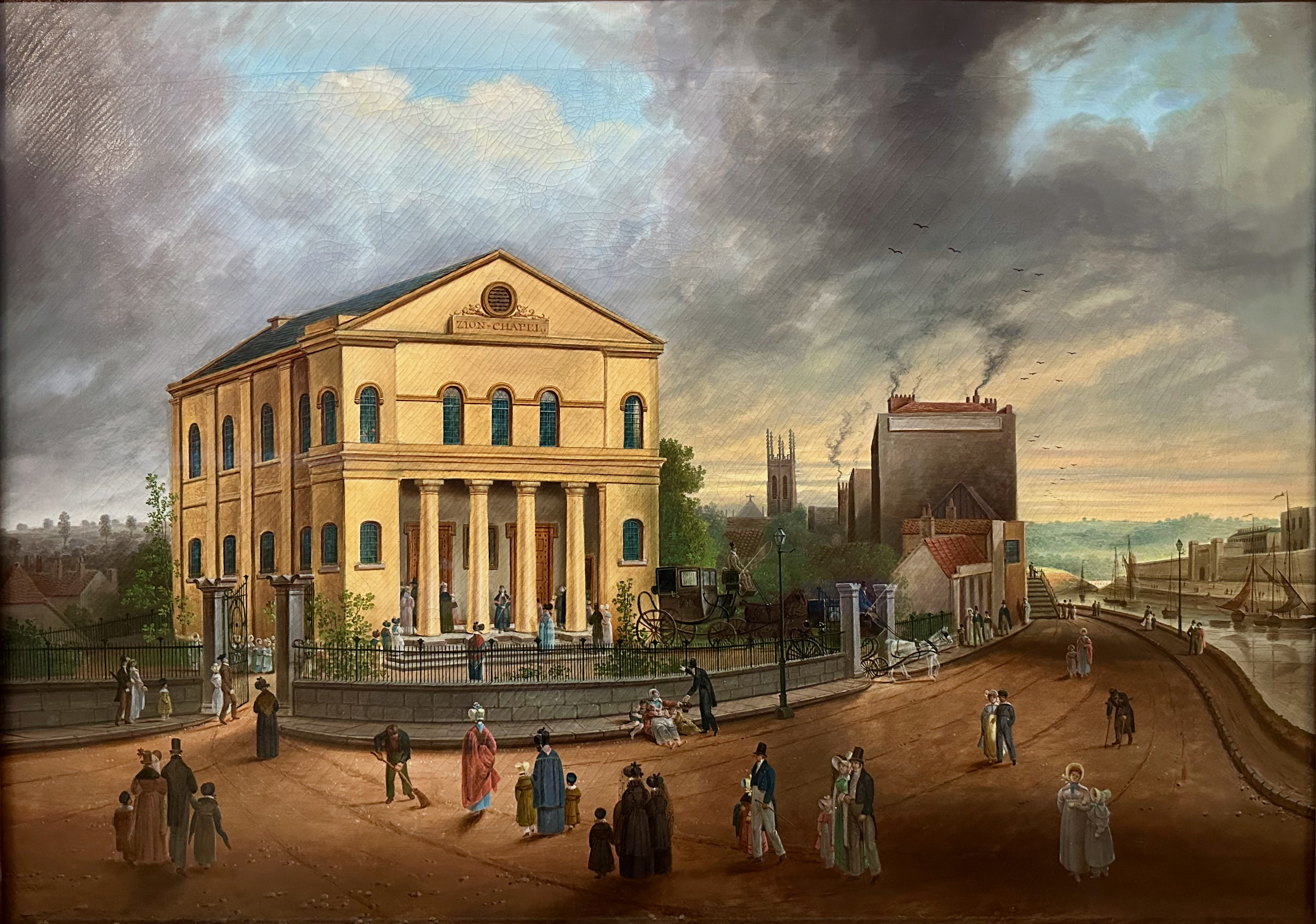
Going to Church, 1832

== Bibliography ==
- Carter, Julia. Bristol Museum and Art Gallery: Guide to the Art Collection. Bristol Books, 2017.
