= Avon County Council =

Former local authority in England

History
- Founded: 1 April 1974
- Disbanded: 1 April 1996
- Succeeded by: Bath and North East Somerset Council; Bristol City Council; North Somerset Council; South Gloucestershire Council

Meeting place
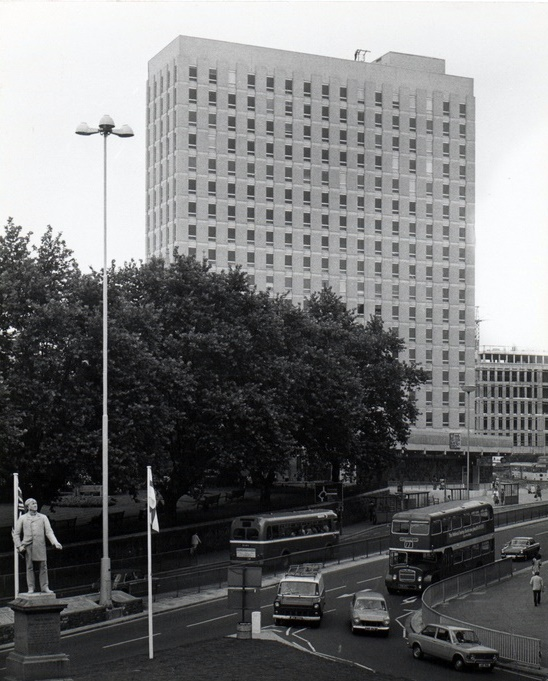
- Avon House, Bristol

Avon County Council was the county council of the non-metropolitan county of Avon in south west England. It came into its powers on 1 April 1974 and was abolished on 1 April 1996 at the same time as the county. The county council was based at Avon House in Bristol. It was replaced with four authorities: Bristol City Council, South Gloucestershire Council, North Somerset Council and Bath and North East Somerset Council.

== Political control ==
From the first election to the council in 1973 political control of the council was held by the following parties:

Party	Tenure
No overall control	1973 – 1977
Conservative	1977 – 1981
Labour	1981 – 1985
No overall control	1985 – 1996

== Council elections ==
- 1973 Avon County Council election
- 1977 Avon County Council election
- 1981 Avon County Council election (new ward boundaries)
- 1985 Avon County Council election
- 1989 Avon County Council election
- 1993 Avon County Council election

== County result maps ==
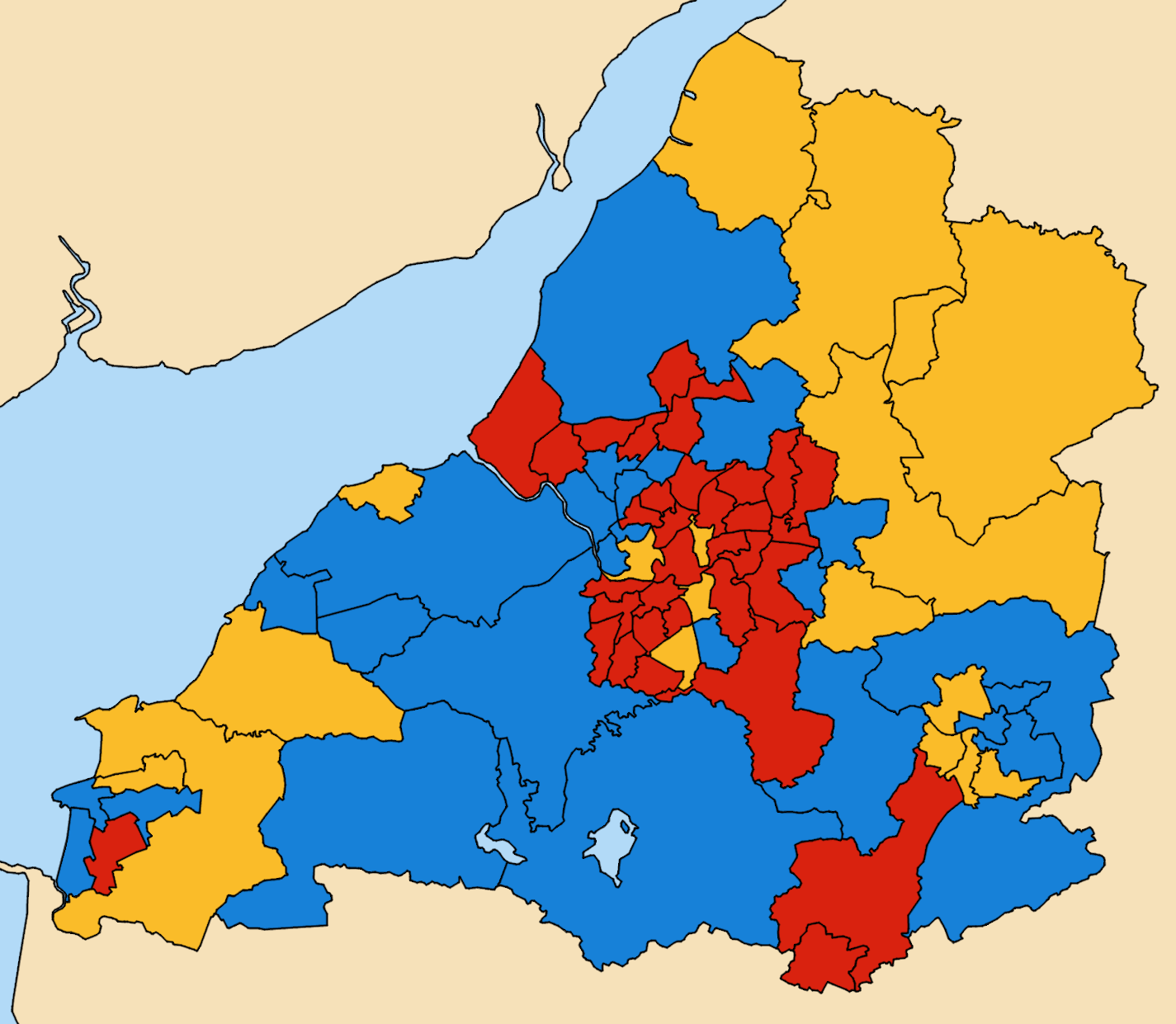
1993 results map

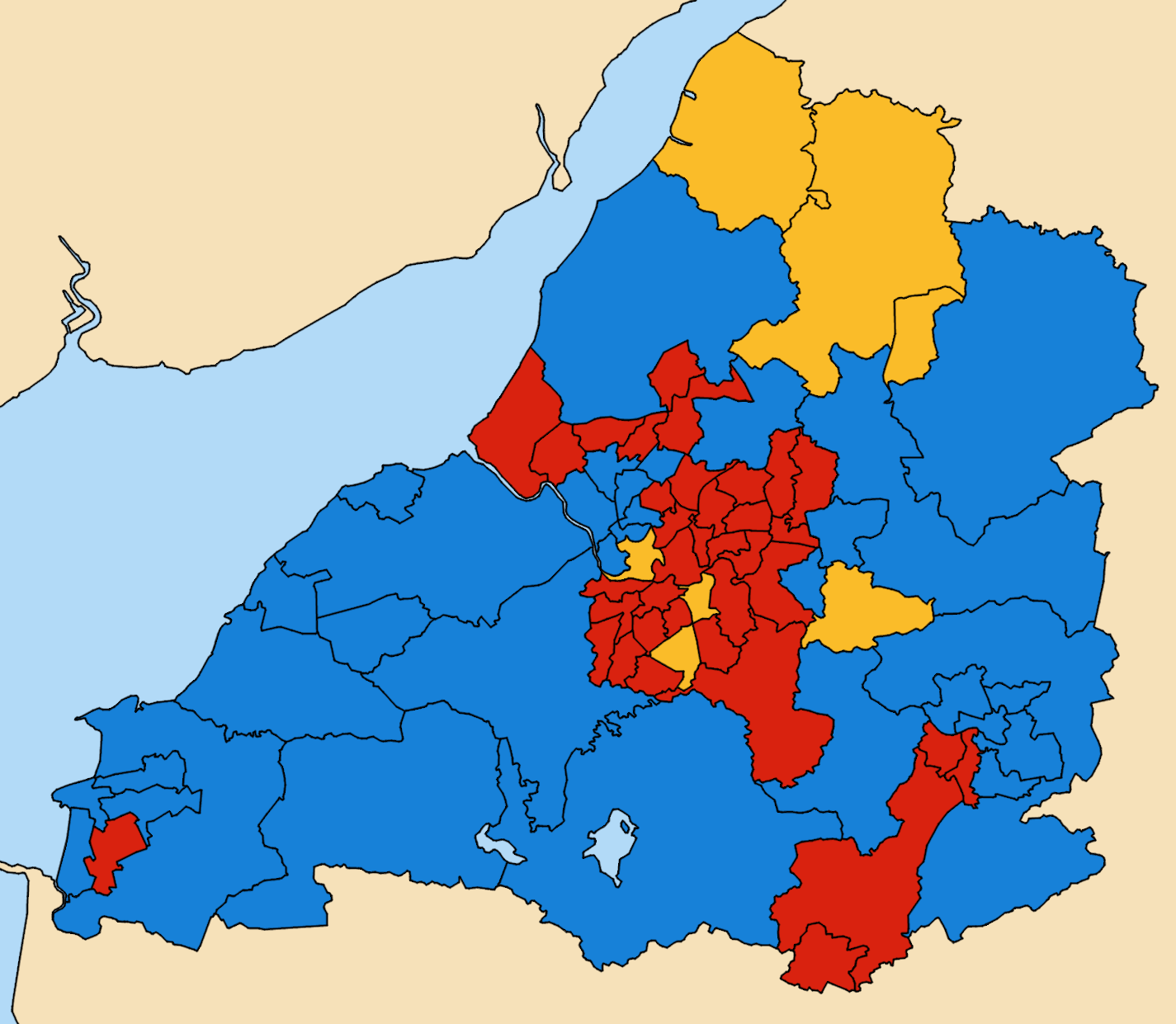
1989 results map

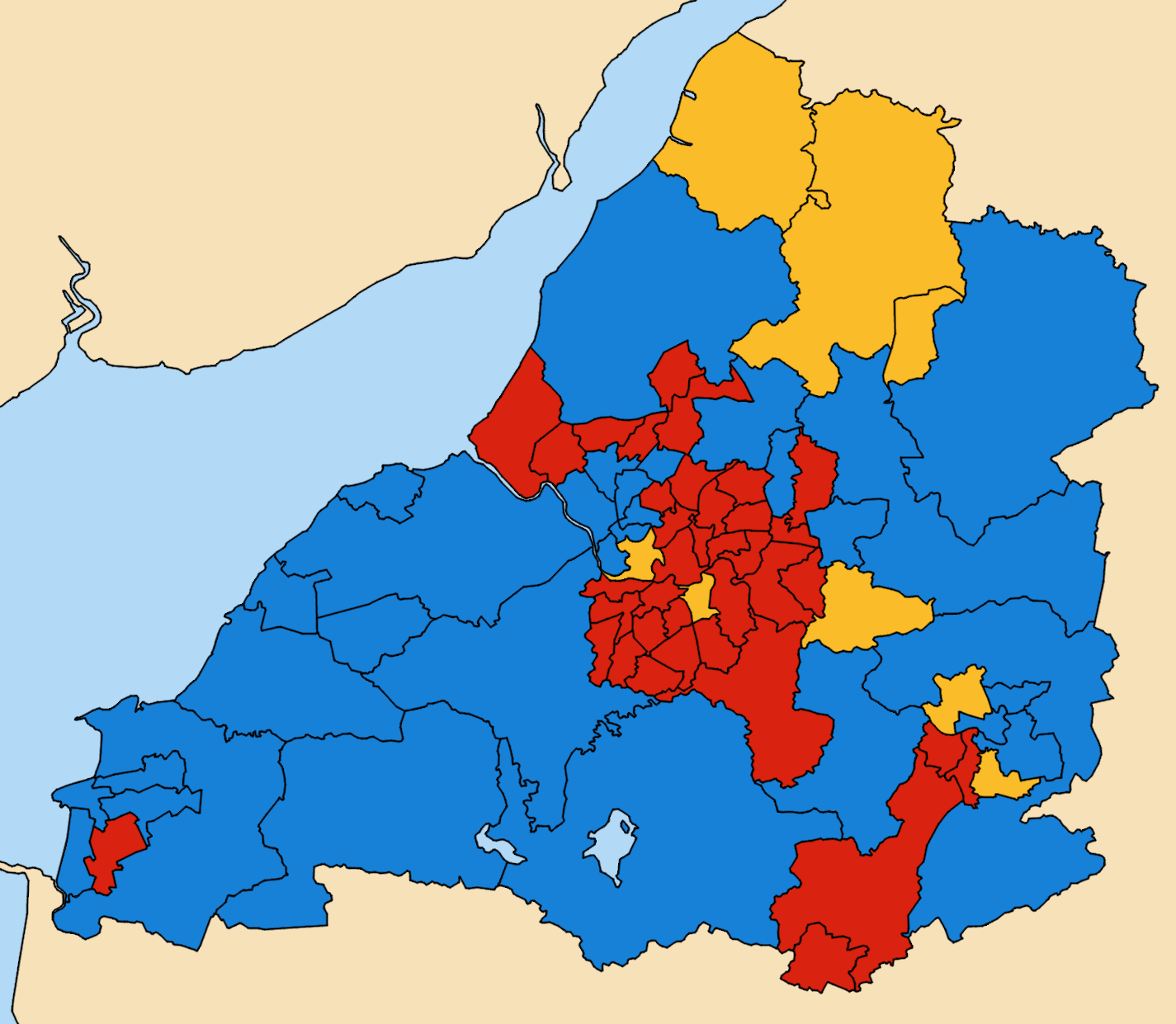
1985 results map

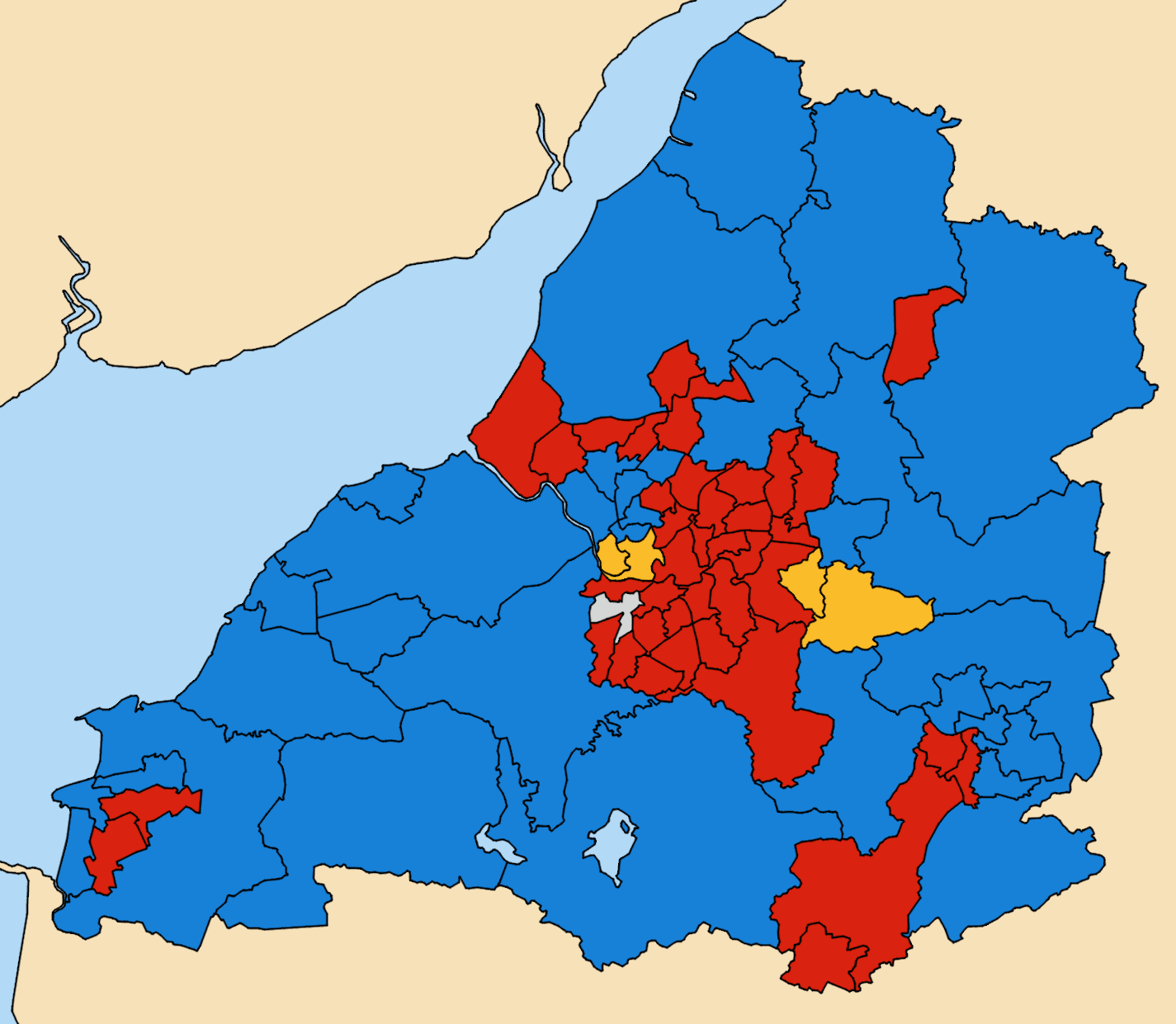
1981 results map

== See also ==
- West of England Combined Authority
