= St James' Priory, Bristol =

St James' Priory Church
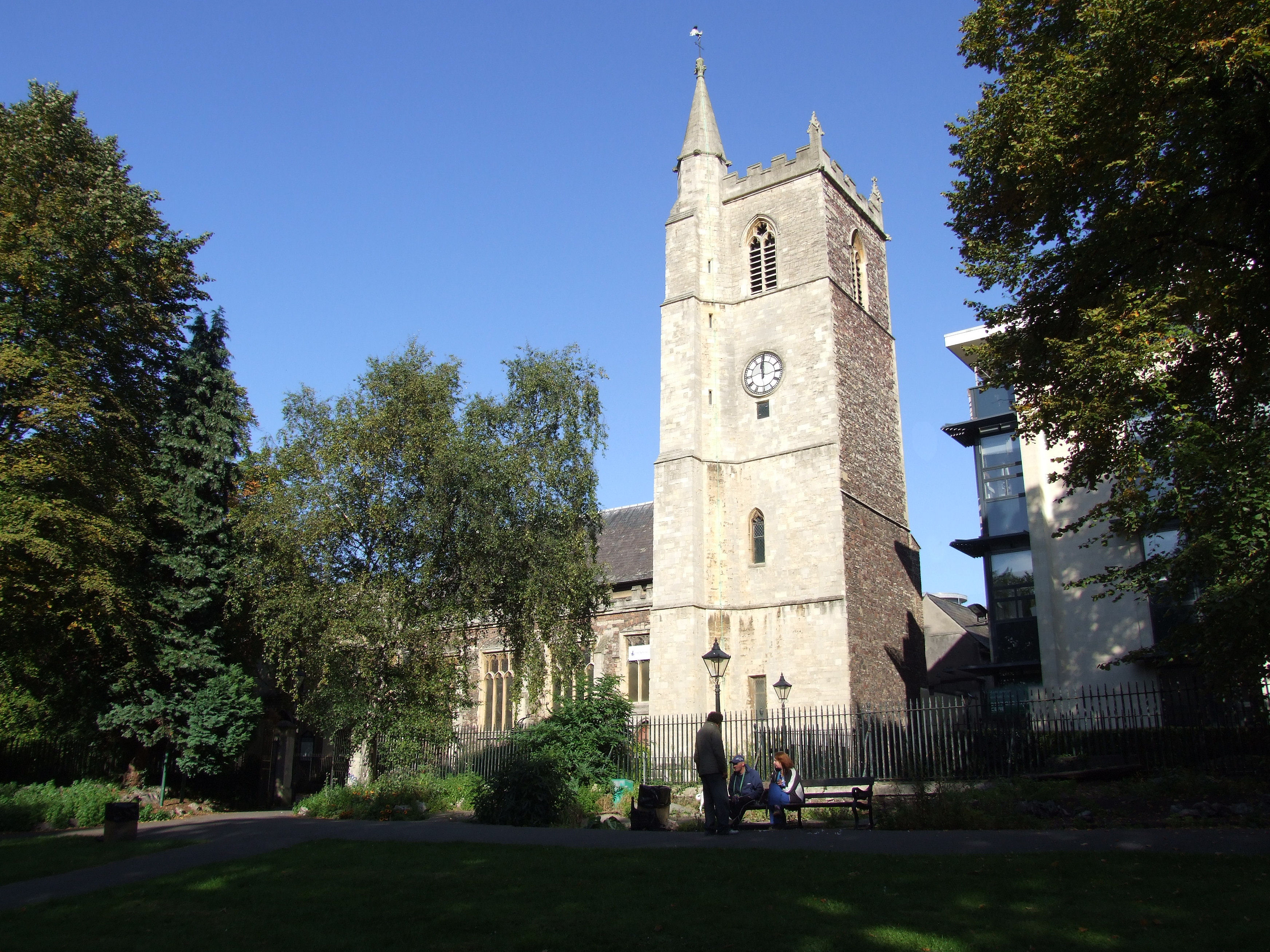
- St James' Priory Church
- 51.458522°N 2.593669°W
- Location: Whitson Street, Horsefair, Bristol
- Country: England
- Denomination: Catholic
- Previous denomination: Anglican (until 1996)

History
- Status: Priory church
- Founded: c. 1129
- Founder: Robert Rufus
- Dedication: St James

Architecture
- Functional status: Active
- Heritage designation: Grade I listed
- Style: Romanesque, Gothic
- Completed: 1374, with alternations from the 15th, 17th, 18th, and 19th centuries

Specifications
- Materials: Stone

Administration
- Diocese: Clifton

Listed Building – Grade I
- Official name: Church of St James' Priory
- Designated: 8 January 1959
- Reference no.: 1282067

The Priory Church of St James, Bristol (grid reference ST588734), is a Grade I listed building in Horsefair, Whitson Street.

St James' Priory
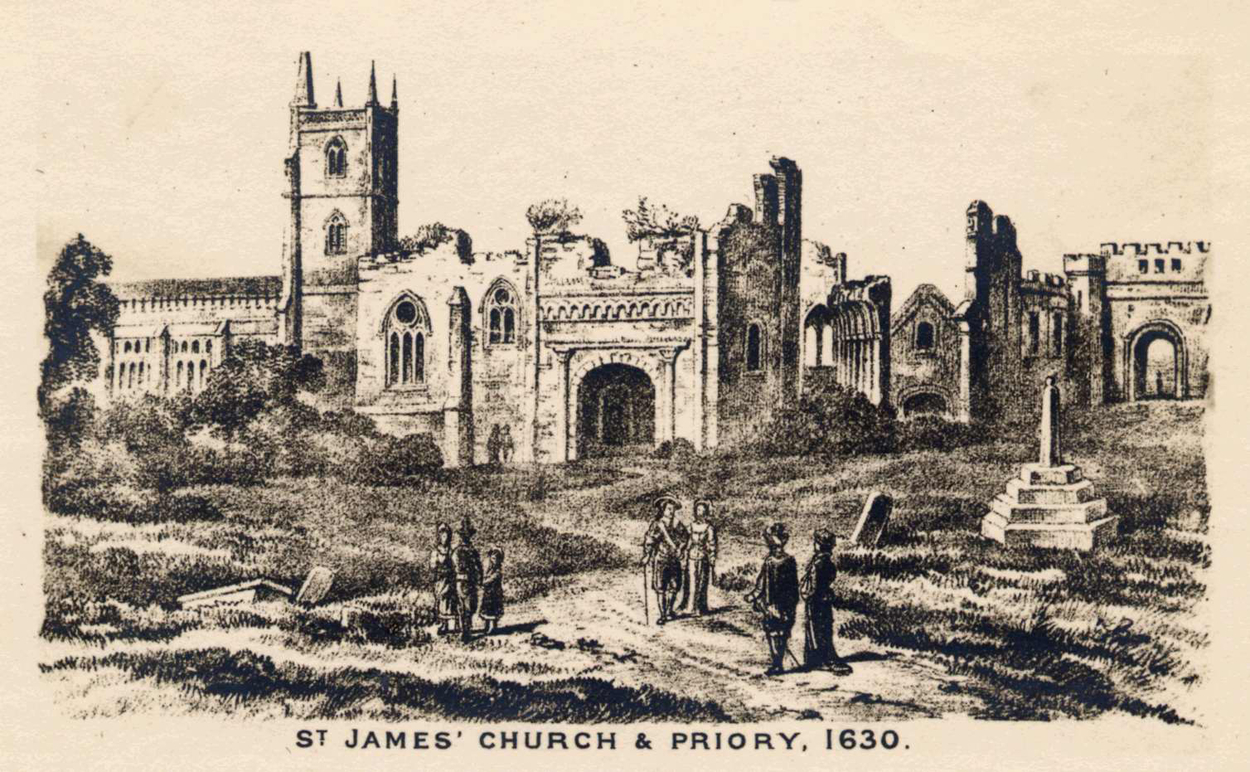
- Interactive map of St James' Priory

Monastery information
- Order: Benedictine (until 1539); Little Brothers of Nazareth (1996–present)
- Denomination: Catholic
- Established: 1137
- Disestablished: 1540
- Reestablished: 1996
- Mother house: Tewkesbury Abbey
- Dedication: Saint James the Greater
- Controlled churches: The Priory Church of St James, Bristol

Architecture
- Status: Priory
- Functional status: Active

It was founded between 1124 and 1137, or more specifically c. 1129 in some sources, as a Benedictine priory by Robert, Earl of Gloucester, the illegitimate son of Henry I. Serving as the first religious house in Bristol, it was strategically located across the River Frome from Bristol Castle, where the Earl was constructing a massive new keep. The Earl endowed the priory with his large meadow, the origin of the modern Broadmead area, which the priory subsequently laid out into a planned suburb consisting of burgage plots. Furthermore, a vast lay cemetery spanning roughly 128,000 square feet was established, extending south from the priory complex to what is currently known as the Horsefair and St James' Park.

The early nave from 1129 survived the Dissolution of the Monasteries because an agreement in 1374 between the Abbot of Tewkesbury and the parishioners stated that the nave would become the parishioners responsibility, and the tower was added around 1374. On 9 January 1540 the dissolution of the monasteries by Henry VIII meant that St James Priory was surrendered to the crown. The priory buildings were demolished, keeping only the nave of the church. In 1543 the land and the right to hold a fair were sold to a London merchant-tailor. In 1604 there was concern that the national attraction of St James' Fair would increase the spread of the plague, so a royal proclamation was issued prohibiting Londoners from attending. The south aisle was widened and rebuilt in 1698. The porch dates from the late 18th century, and the north aisle was rebuilt in 1864.

The traditional account, as told to John Leland, has it that every tenth stone brought from Normandy to build the Castle was set aside to build the Priory.

Before the recent restoration (see below) the building was on the Historic England Buildings at Risk Register and described as being in very bad condition. However, substantial restoration and reordering work was completed in 2011 and as of 2014 St James Priory is not on the Heritage Buildings at Risk Register.

Today, it is an active church within the Catholic Diocese of Clifton, which until 1996 was a Church of England place of worship.

== Archives ==
Parish records for St James' Priory, Bristol are held at Bristol Archives (Ref. P.St J), online catalogue including baptism, marriage and burial registers. The archive also includes records of the incumbent, churchwardens, overseers of the poor, parochial church council, chantries, charities, St James' Fair, schools, societies and vestry plus deeds, photographs and plans. Other records for St James' Priory can be found at Cambridge University Library.

== St James's Fair ==
Earl Robert's endowment to the priory in 1137 included permission to hold an annual fair. From 1238 an annual fair held over fifteen days, was held here. Later charters show the original date of the fair to be Whitsun Day, but the inconvenience of the festival changing date each year soon changed the fair day to 25 July, the feast day of St James. It was later changed to the first fortnight in September. The fair, which was held in the Churchyard and adjoining streets, was regarded as the most important of the Bristol Fairs. The income from the Fair meant that St James Church could be richly decorated, in 1498 an elaborate reredos was built to go with the existing rood screen. The contract made it clear that the rood screen should be bigger and better than the one recently erected at St Mary Redcliffe.

The papers from a court case in 1518-19 show that the fair was so popular it had overflowed the boundaries of the graveyard and stalls and booths were sited in the surrounding streets. The entertainments at the fair included theatre, bear-baiting, sports as well as minstrels and wrestling, exhibitions of wild animals, acrobats, puppets (including Punch and Judy), magicians and musicians. One year the prize exhibition was 'Toby the salient Pig.' Further entertainments took place on 'The Marsh' which later became Queen Square. Amongst the groups of players on the Mayor's ledger books for the St James Fair are the Lord Chamberlain's Men, which could suggest that Shakespeare performed in Bristol. The Ledger kept by the merchant John Smyth shows how he (and other city merchants) planned their year so that their goods (such as wine, dyes, oil, iron, fruit, and luxury goods) would be in stock in time for the fair.

By the 17th century the fair was so prominent that merchant ships sailing into Bristol for it were frequently attacked by Turkish pirates in the Bristol Channel. The last fair was held in 1837 under pressure from moralists and strict religious people concerned about the corruption of the young and disapproving of such frivolities set in a graveyard. It also subsequently left its mark on the geography of Bristol as a nearby road in Broadmead is called the Horsefair.

The St James Barton roundabout (The Bearpit) retains the name of the Barton or Priory Farm, on which's land the Fair was once held.

== St James Priory Project ==
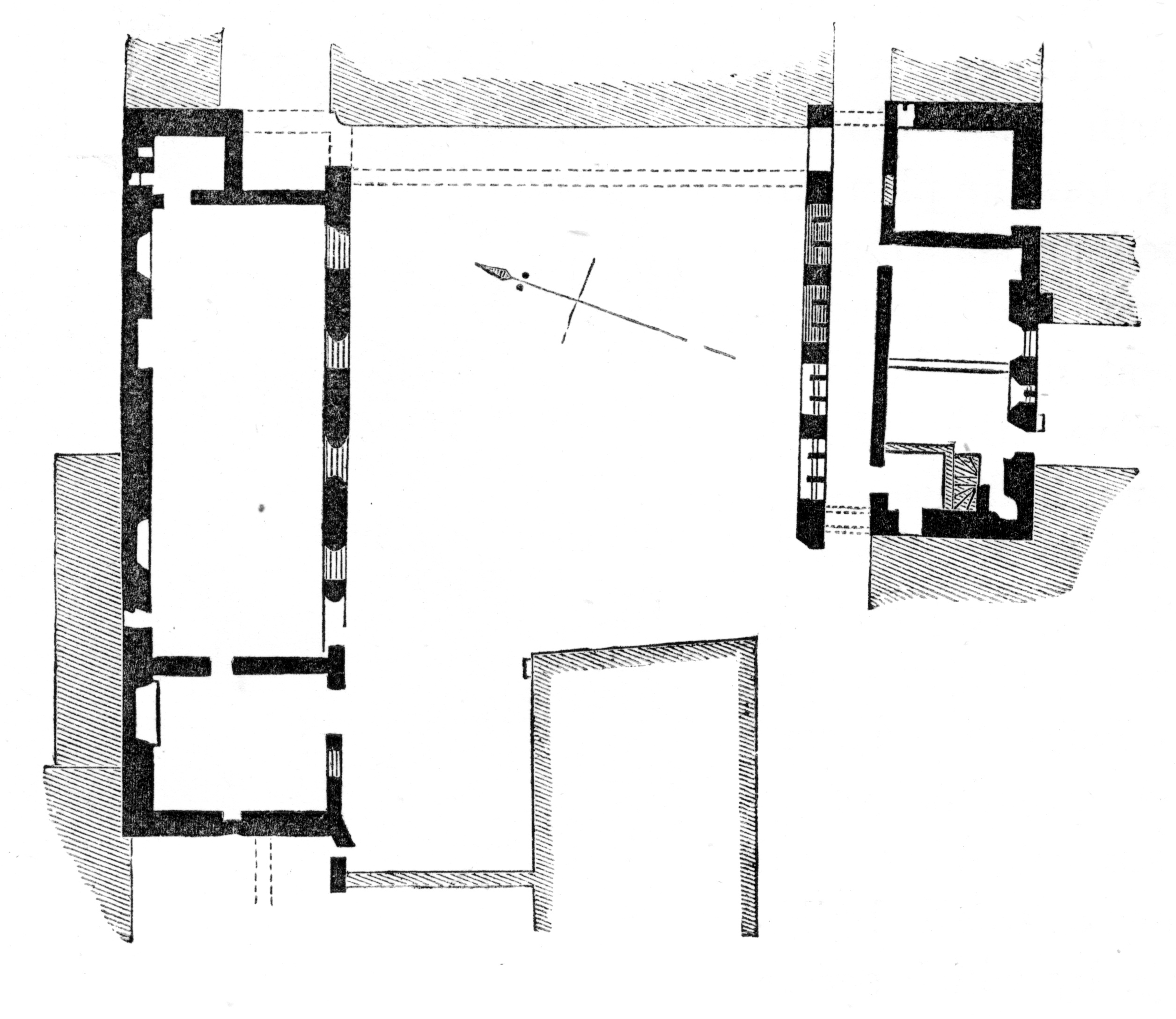
A plan of the priory from 1882

After the Dissolution of the Monasteries, the nave of the priory church continued in use as an Anglican parish church. It fell into disuse in the 1980s and declared a redundant church before the Church Commissioners put it up for sale.

In 1996 the Little Brothers of Nazareth re-established it as a Catholic church, and set up the St James Priory Project which offers support to vulnerable people especially those with a history of substance dependency and mental illness.

== Restoration ==
Following the award of a Heritage Lottery Fund grant of £3.2 million to conserve, repair, and develop the Priory, building work started in November 2009. The St James Priory charity had to fundraise a further £1.2 million of matched funding toward the restoration work. Conservation, restoration and development lasted 21 months and the Priory Church was re-opened on 25 July 2011. Archaeologists from Bristol and Region Archaeological Services were on site during the restoration works, and uncovered a fragment of what may be the earliest scientific sundial in Britain. The sundial is a block of Bath stone carved with hour lines and medieval Arabic numerals in a style that suggests it was probably made in the 15th century. The discovery that a statue in the church had originally been topless made headlines around the world.

== Burials at St James' Priory, Bristol ==
- Robert, 1st Earl of Gloucester, interred in 1147 before the high altar in the monks' church.
- Mabel FitzRobert, Countess of Gloucester
- Eleanor, Fair Maid of Brittany, was initially buried at the priory in 1241 "with all solemnity and honour". Her remains were later transferred to Amesbury, though daily masses continued to be held for her soul at St James.
Illustrations

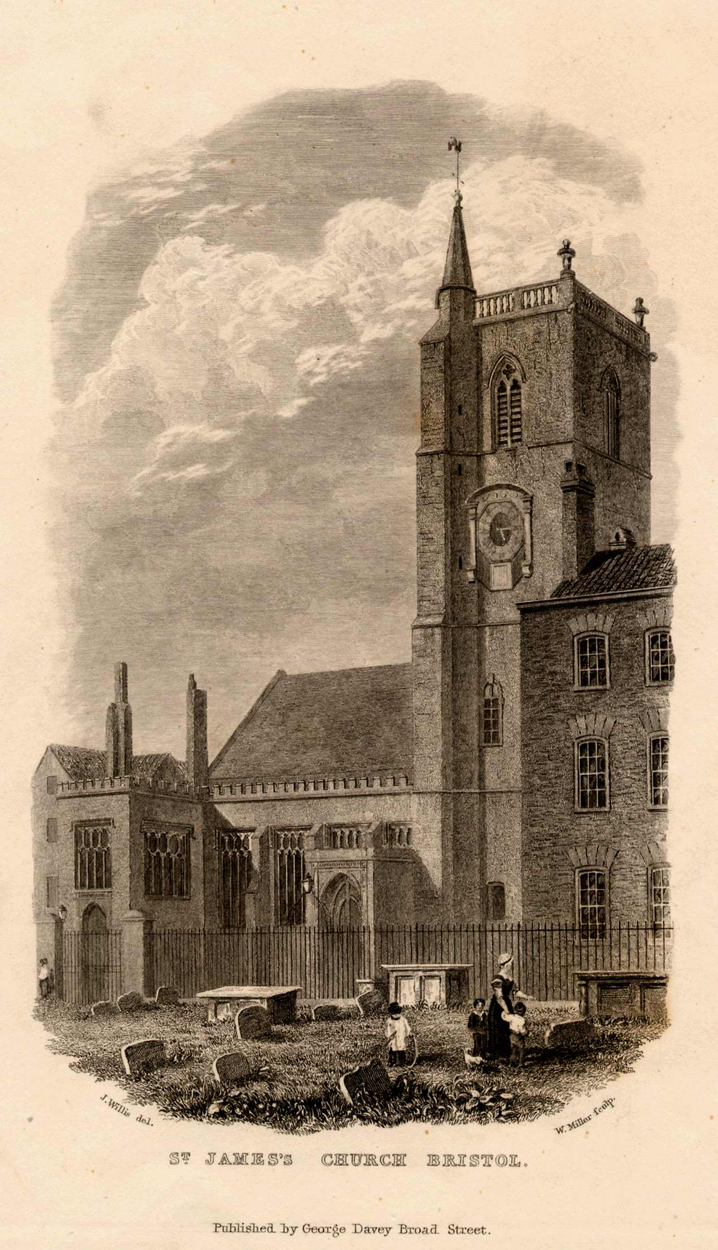
Monochrome print of St James' church from c.1838. The image shows the church from the south east aspect in the background, with the graveyard (the site of St James' Fair) in the foreground. In the graveyard can be seen a mother with three children standing at a grave.

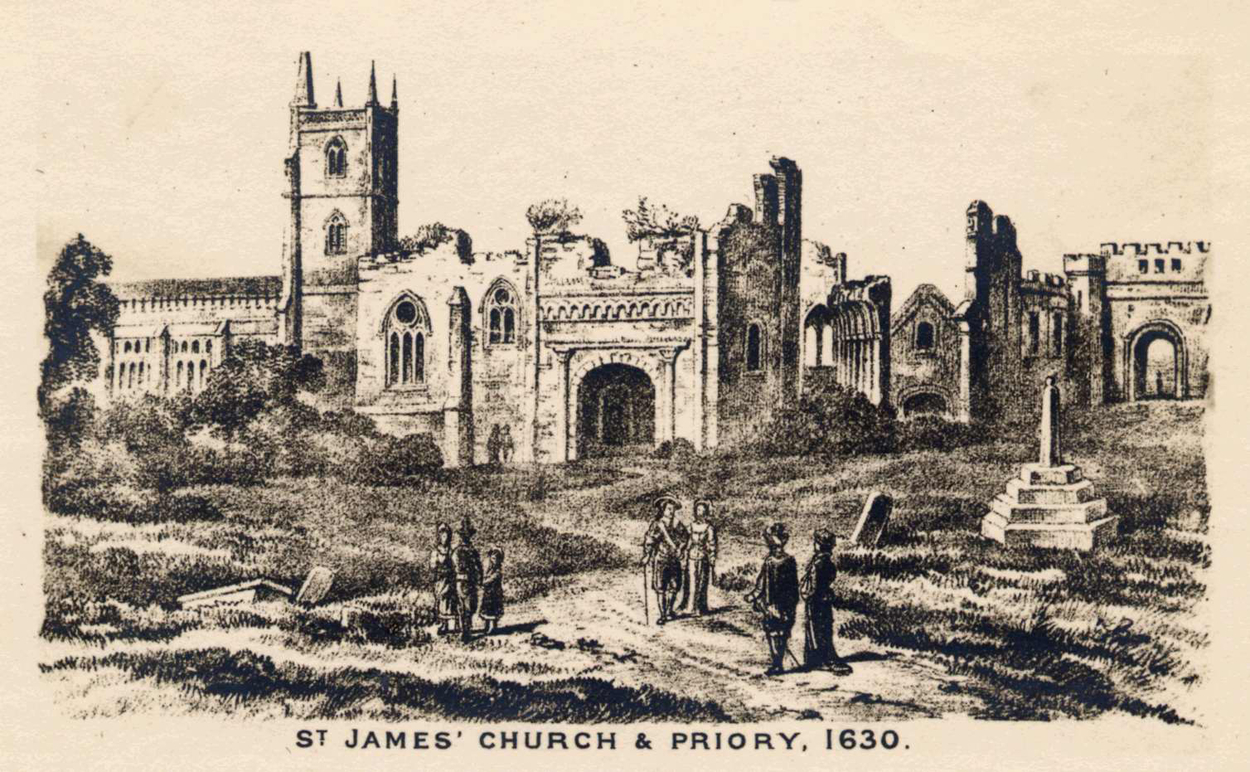
Monochrome illustration of St James' church and Priory ruins, published in 1630. The image shows the church from the south east aspect in the background on the left, with the Priory ruins in the foreground in the centre and on the right. Amongst the ruins can be seen men and women in seventeenth century costume.

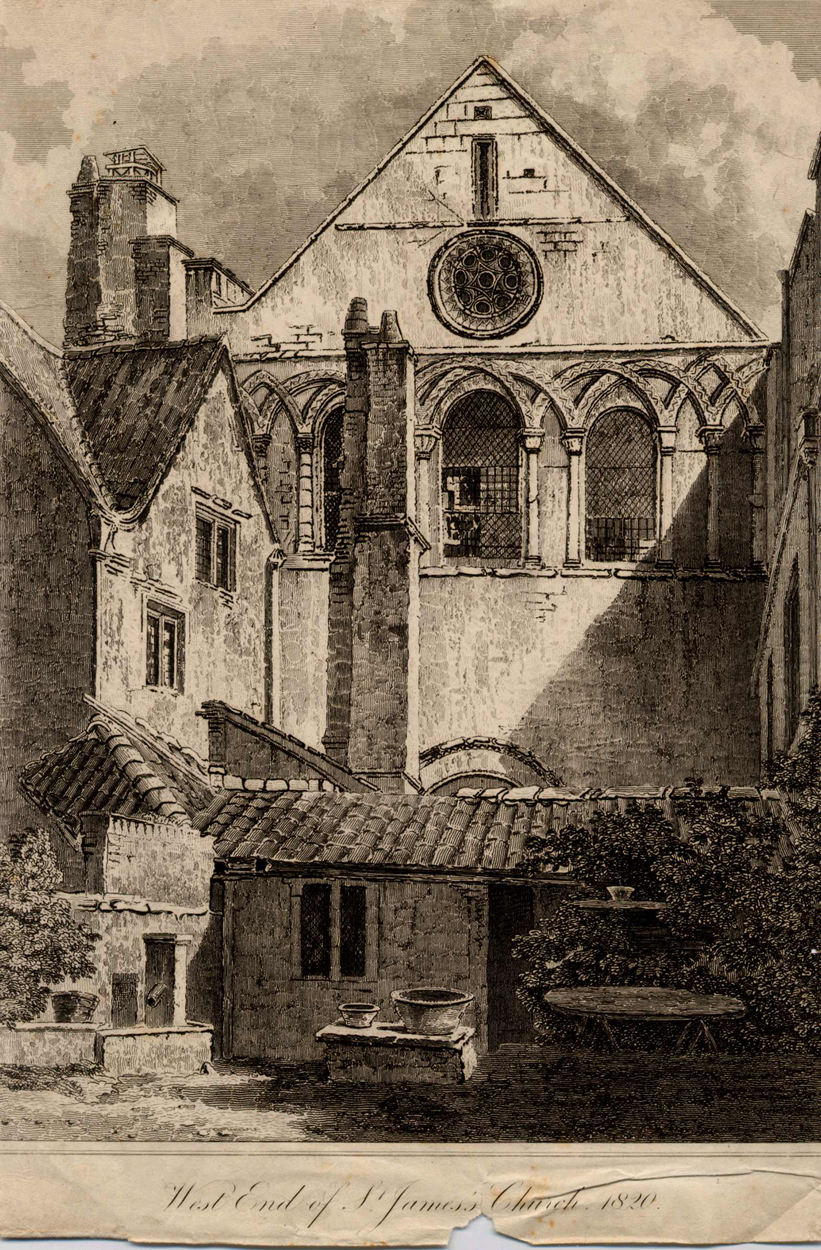
Monochrome illustration of the west end of St James' church, published in 1820. The image shows the parts of the priory stonemasonry incorporated into the church facade and a jumble of non-ecclesiastical buildings in the foreground including a tall chimney.

== See also ==
- Grade I listed buildings in Bristol
- Churches in Bristol
- List of English abbeys, priories and friaries serving as parish churches
