= Twinnell House =

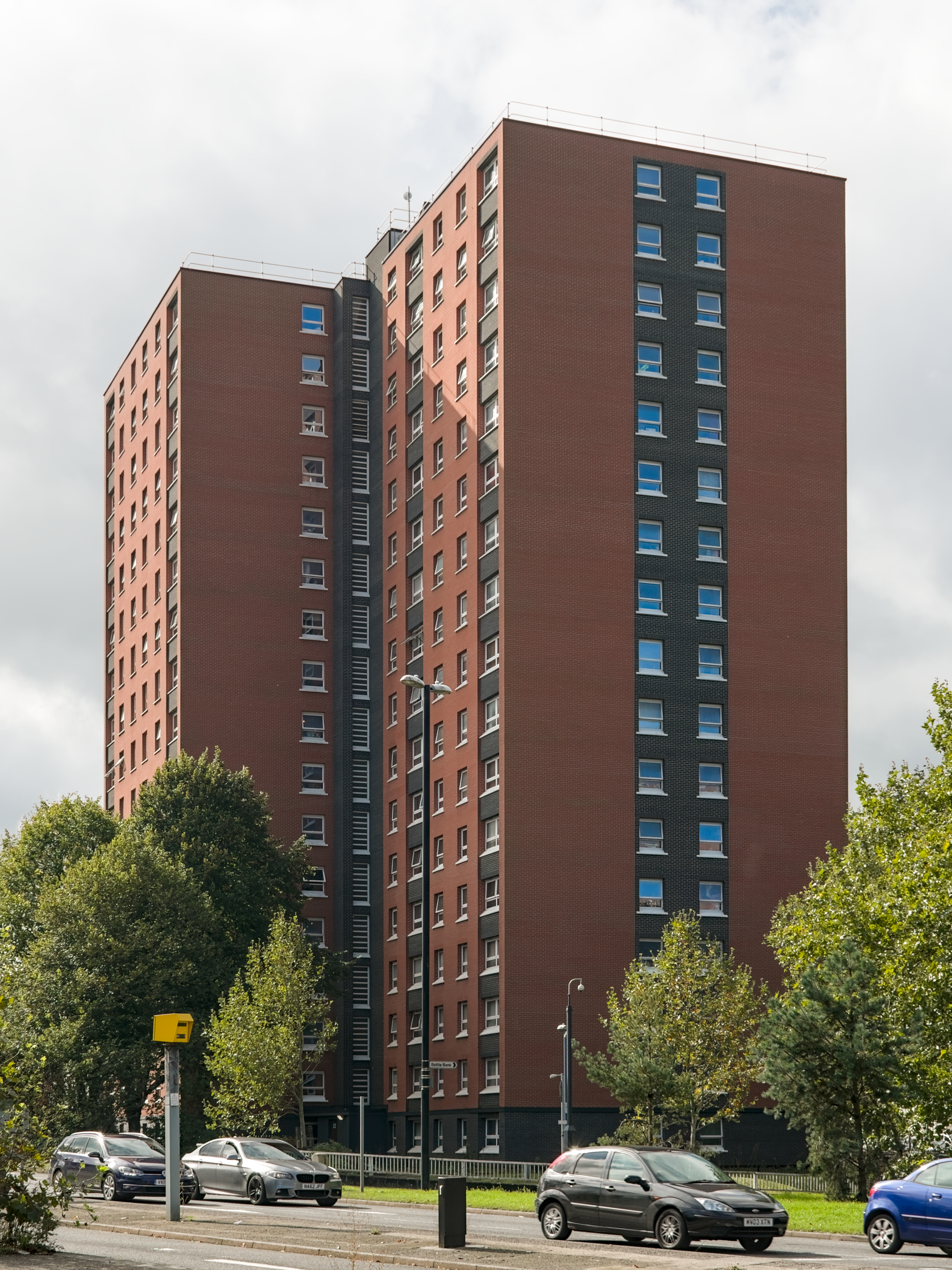
- Twinnell House as seen from Easton Way, part of the Outer Circuit Road.
- Interactive map of the Twinnell House area

General information
- Status: Completed
- Type: Residential tower block
- Architectural style: Modernist
- Location: Easton, Bristol, England, Twinnell House, Wills Drive, Easton, Bristol, BS5 0PY, BS5 0PZ, BS5 0QA, BS5 0QB
- Coordinates: 51.462151°N 2.571198°W
- Construction started: 1967
- Completed: 1968
- Opened: 27 June 1968
- Client: Bristol Housing Department
- Owner: Bristol City Council

Height
- Height: 49 m

Technical details
- Floor count: 17

Design and construction
- Architect: Albert H. Clarke
- Architecture firm: City Architect's Department
- Main contractor: George Wimpey

Twinnell House is a 17-storey residential tower block in the Easton area of Bristol, England. Built in 1969 at a height of 49 metres, it is the tallest council-owned housing block in the area. The tower was built as part of the wider Easton Comprehensive Redevelopment Area, designed by City Architect Albert H. Clarke, and was officially opened by Lord Mayor Mercia Castle on 27 June 1968. In 2022, the building became the centre of national attention following a fire in the building which killed one and injured a further eight.

== History ==
=== Planning and construction ===
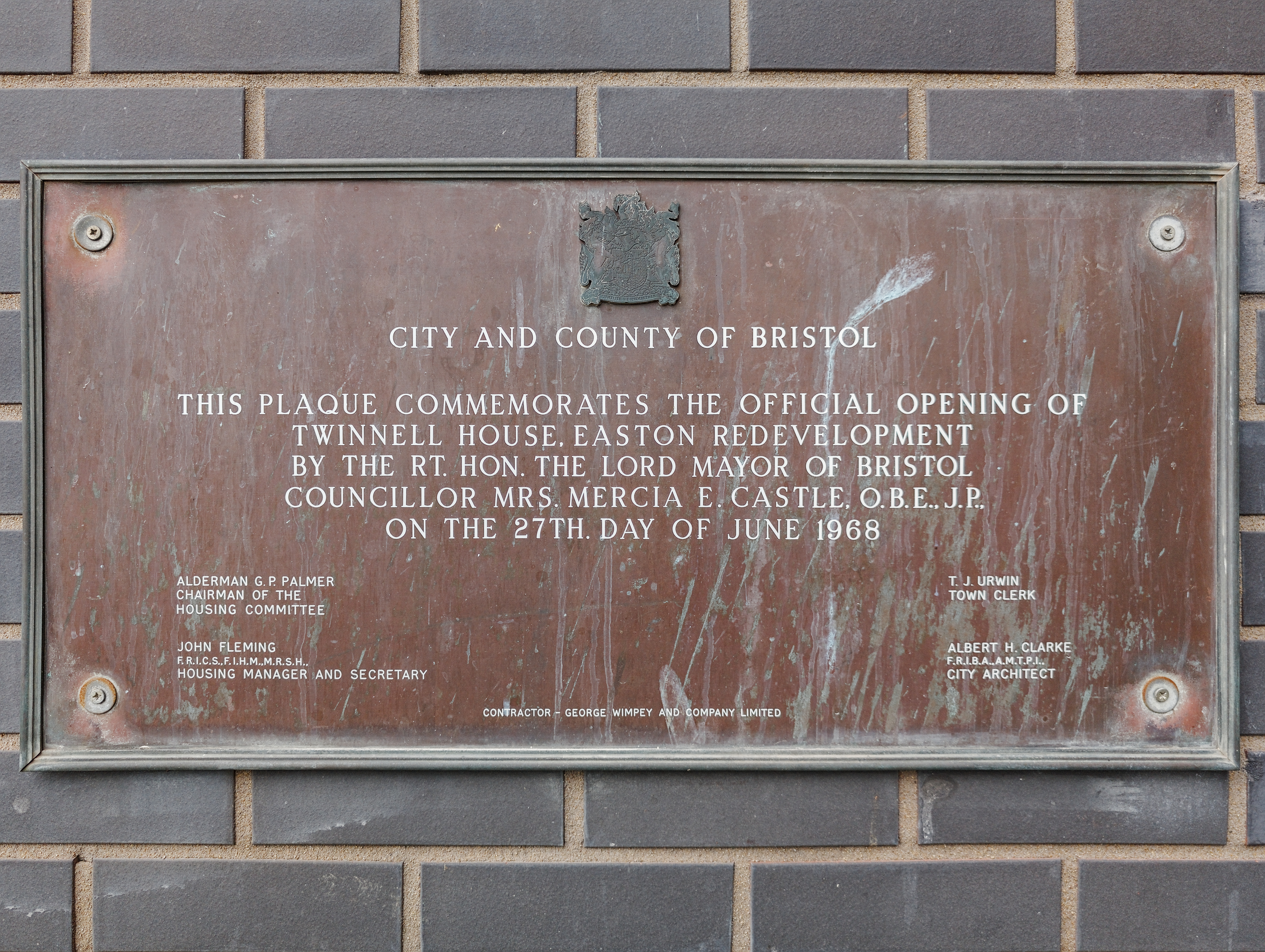
Plaque on Twinnell House commemorating its official opening on 27 June 1968 by the Lord Mayor of Bristol, Councillor Mrs Mercia E. Castle, with Alderman G. P. Palmer (Chairman of the Housing Committee), John Fleming (Housing Manager and Secretary), T. J. Urwin (Town Clerk) and Albert H. Clarke (City Architect).

Twinnell House was built as part of a wave of high-rise construction undertaken by Bristol City Council between the 1950s and 1970s, intended to replace inner-city slums with modern public housing. Central government incentives encouraged this vertical expansion, and the council constructed 69 tower blocks of six to 17 storeys during this period.

Completed in 1968, Twinnell House was the tallest of a group of high-rises in Easton including Croydon House and Lansdowne Court, all constructed in the midst of post-war slum clearance and increasing need for housing that provided hot water and internal bathrooms.

=== Social conditions and crime ===
Over time, the tower became associated with social problems. The building was identified in 2005 as a hotspot for gatherings related to the use and distribution of khat, particularly among members of the local Somali community. Residents have also described conditions marked by frequent drug dealing, vandalism, and threats to child safety. Despite a closure order issued in late 2019 to restrict access to non-residents, reports in 2020 indicated that illegal activity persisted in the stairwells and entrances of the block, including recruitment of children into drug dealing groups.

=== 2022 fire ===
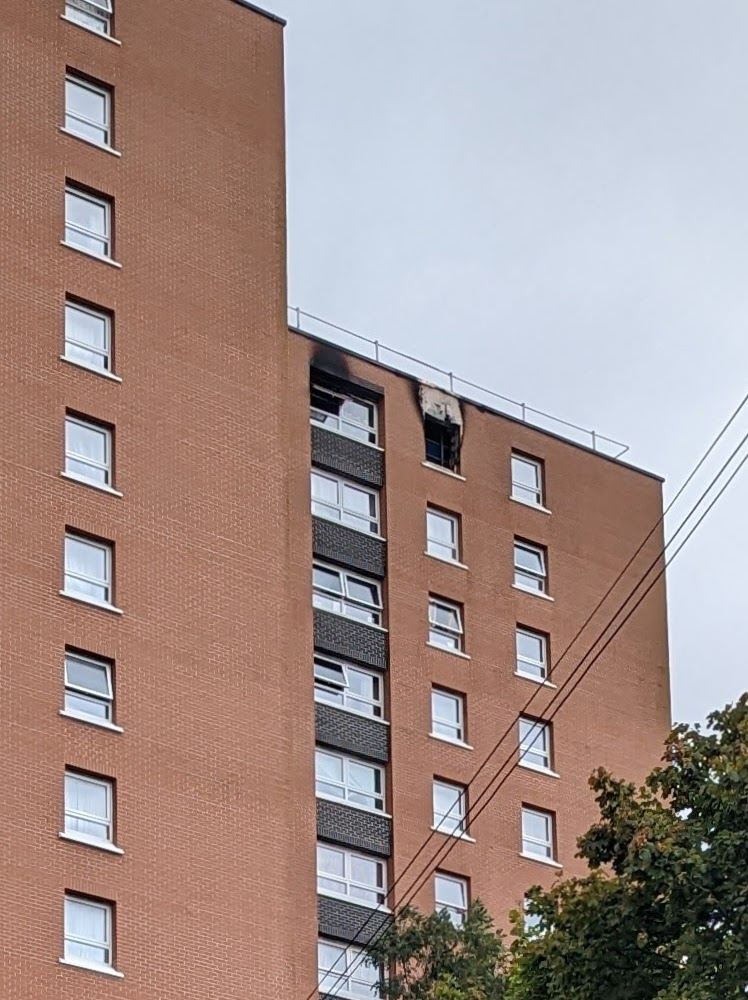
Twinnell House viewed from Beaumont Street. One of the units on the top floor can be seen burned out.

On 25 September 2022, a fire broke out on the top floor of Twinnell House. Abdul Jabar Oryakhel, an Afghan refugee living in the building, died after falling from the window of his flat in an attempt to escape the fire. Eight others were hospitalised for burns or smoke inhalation. The fire, which started in a flat, was quickly contained by Avon Fire and Rescue Service.

The fire was later determined to have been caused by a homemade electric bicycle stored in the flat, which used low-quality lithium-ion batteries. Though the building's expanded polystyrene external cladding did not ignite, it was identified as a contributing factor to fire spread in the Twinnell House incident and another, later fire in nearby Eccleston House caused by arson.

Residents reported the absence of audible central fire alarms and the lack of sprinklers, prompting widespread criticism. Emergency services confirmed that personal fire alarms and fire doors functioned as expected, although public trust in the safety of the building was significantly damaged.

The incident led Bristol City Council to initiate a programme to reclad 38 towers using rock-based materials and introduce fire wardens and upgraded alarms to mitigate risks.

== Design ==
Twinnell House is a 17-storey concrete-frame block, designed in the modernist tradition common to British high-rise social housing of the 1960s. Though externally it appears brick-clad, this effect is achieved through a slip-finish applied to precast concrete panels. Internally, flats are arranged off central corridors with stairwells and lifts located in a core. Later reports have noted extensive internal degradation including graffiti, broken fixtures, and unsanitary conditions in communal areas.

The building was retrofitted with expanded polystyrene cladding prior to the 2022 fire, but not with a centralised sprinkler system. Following the fire, fire breaks and compartmentalisation were acknowledged to have slowed fire spread, although residents noted serious concerns about evacuation procedures and access limitations for emergency services.

== See also ==
- Public housing in the United Kingdom
- Grenfell Tower fire
- Barton House
