= St Gabriel's Church, Bristol =

Demolished church in Bristol, England

St Gabriel's Church
- Church of St Gabriel with St Lawrence
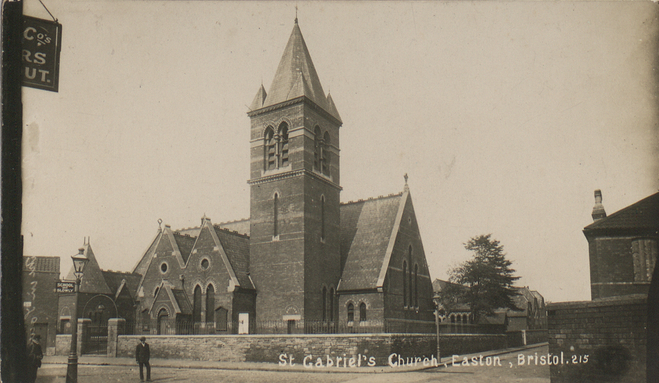
- An early 20th-century postcard produced by Viner & Co. of Bath, depicting the church prior to the removal of its spire
- St Gabriel's Church
- 51.461957°N 2.569414°W
- Location: Easton, Bristol, England
- Denomination: Church of England
- Tradition: Evangelical

History
- Consecrated: 14 March 1870

Architecture
- Architect: J. Neale
- Style: Gothic Revival; Bristol Byzantine
- Years built: 1868–1870
- Construction cost: £3,000
- Closed: 1 November 1974
- Demolished: August 1975

Specifications
- Capacity: 619

Administration
- Division: Archdeaconry of Bristol
- Diocese: Diocese of Bristol
- Parish: St Gabriel with St Lawrence

St Gabriel's Church was a Church of England parish church located in Upper Easton, Bristol. It was designed by the architect J. Neale in an adaptation of the Early English Gothic style using polychrome brickwork characteristic of the Bristol Byzantine style. The church was consecrated in 1870 to serve the growing industrial population of east Bristol.

Following a period of redundancy and severe vandalism, the church was the subject of a planning controversy in 1975 when it was demolished by Bristol City Council days after being listed as a building of architectural interest by the Department of the Environment.

== History ==
St Gabriel's was established to serve the district of Upper Easton, an area described at the time as a "poor neighbourhood" with an almost entirely working-class population. Prior to the church's construction, services were held in a school room of the Trinity branch, with a congregation of approximately 200 people. The new district was carved out of the parish of Holy Trinity, St Philip's, with the Ecclesiastical Commissioners apportioning a population of approximately 6,000 to the new parish. The parish was deeply rooted in the industrial character of east Bristol as the church was situated adjacent to the Easton Colliery (owned by Messrs. Leonard, Boult, and Co.), and many parishioners were miners or industrial labourers.

The foundation stone was laid in 1868. The initial estimate for the design was £2,129, but the discovery that the ground required excavating to a depth of 18 feet (5.5 m) to reach solid foundation entailed significant extra expense for concrete infill. The church was consecrated on the morning of 14 March 1870 by Charles Ellicott, the Bishop of Gloucester and Bristol. While contemporary reports cited the cost at £3,000, later records indicate a total building cost of £4,400 raised by public subscription, which included a £200 grant from the Gloucester and Bristol Diocesan Association. The patronage of the living was held by the Bristol Church Trustees.

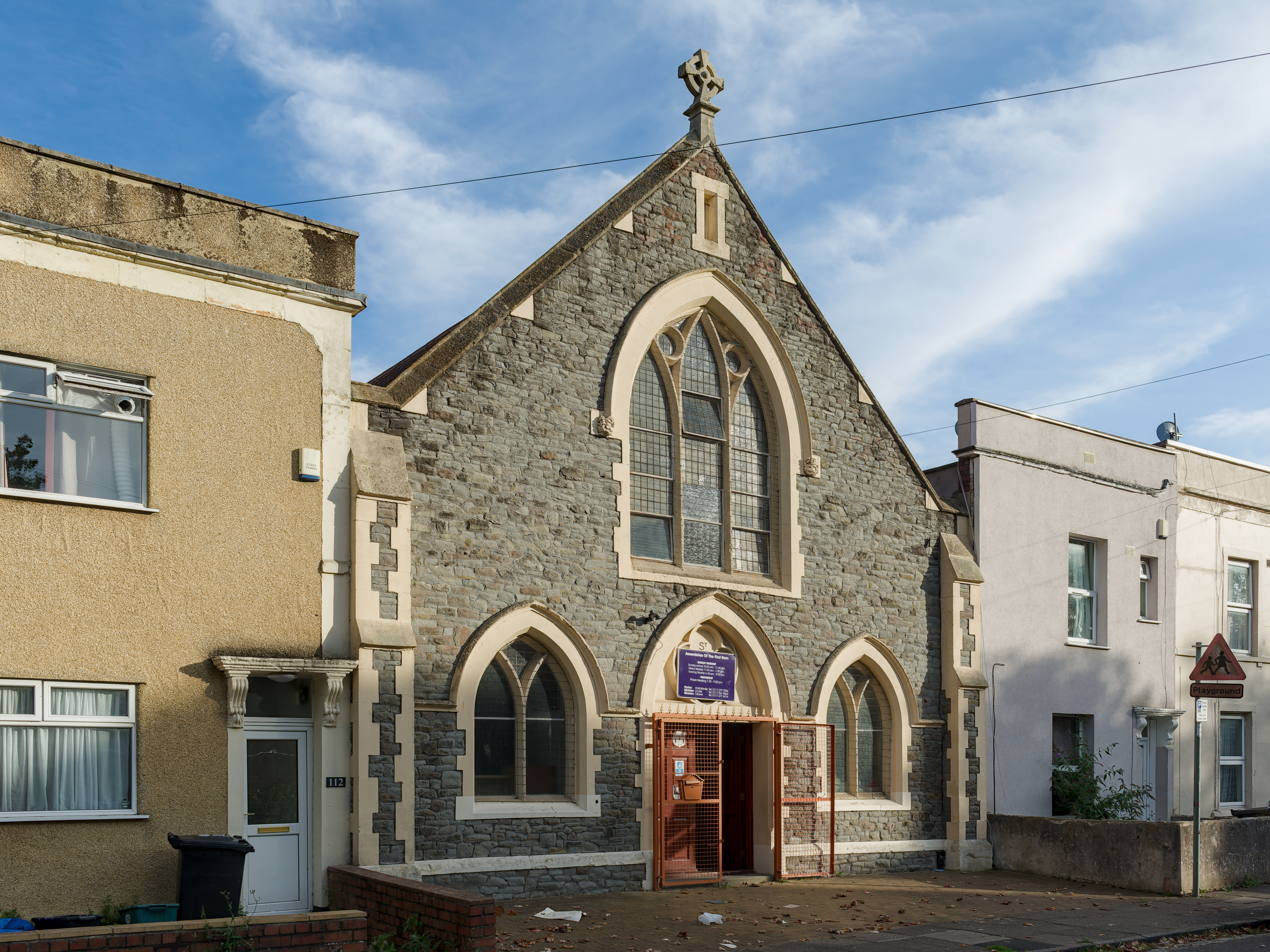
The former church hall of St Gabriel's on Goodhind Street is now the last surviving building of this parish. It is now in use by the Assemblies of the First Born.

Education soon became a focus of the new parish. In February 1872, the foundation stone for a new school adjoining the church was laid. Like the main church, it was designed by J. Neale and was made to accommodate 600 children. The school was built by Messrs. Wilkins of St Paul's at a cost of £1,550. By 1892, the Sunday School had 1,000 attendees, and the day school educated 870 children.

To accommodate the growing parish, a temporary mission hall was opened in Goodhind Street in 1905 at a cost of £675. This was eventually replaced by a permanent church hall, dedicated in February 1915 and built at a cost of £1,150.

In 1954, following the closure of the nearby St Lawrence's Church on Lawrence Hill, the two parishes were united to form the parish of St Gabriel with St Lawrence.

By the 1960s, the church fabric required significant maintenance. A restoration project costing £3,000 was launched to strengthen the foundations, which had been affected by underground mine workings, and to install a new lighting system. The church celebrated its centenary in March 1970 with a service attended by the Lord Mayor and preached by Hugh Gough, the former Archbishop of Sydney. However, the construction of new tower blocks as part of the Easton Comprehensive Redevelopment Area and the construction of the Outer Circuit Road left the church isolated, and in the same year plans were announced to replace both St Gabriel's and Holy Trinity Church with the new Easton Christian Family Centre, a move supported by the diocese to create a modern community centre.

=== Redundancy and demolition ===
The church was officially closed for worship on 1 November 1974 and declared redundant. Following its closure, the building suffered from extensive vandalism: thieves stripped lead flashing from the roof, stole the brass lectern, and removed the church bell by lowering it through a trapdoor. In August 1975, a man was convicted of stealing 25 organ pipes to sell as scrap metal.

Due to the building's rapid deterioration, Bristol City Council issued a Dangerous Structure Order in July 1975. However, on 8 August 1975, the Department of the Environment listed the church as a building of architectural interest, creating a legal standoff. Despite the listing and opposition to the demolition plans from the public and the Bristol Civic Society, the Planning Committee voted 10 to 1 to proceed with demolition in the interest of public safety. The church was demolished in late August 1975. The site was subsequently redeveloped for a low-rise council housing complex known as Hilton Court. The Easton Christian Family Centre is now the sole remaining church of what is now known as the Parish of Holy Trinity with St Gabriel St Lawrence and St Jude.

== Architecture and fittings ==
=== Exterior ===
St Gabriel's was designed by the Bristol architect J. Neale and built by James P. Phippen of St Paul's. The structure was constructed almost entirely of brick in a style described as an adaptation of Early English Gothic in the Bristol Byzantine style, utilising red brick with accents of blue and yellow brick.

The plan consisted of a nave (70 by 20 feet (21.3 by 6.1 m)), chancel (26 by 29 feet (7.9 by 8.8 m)), north and south transepts, and side chapels serving as vestry and organ chambers. The original design featured a tower situated in the corner of the south transept and chancel. It stood 90 feet (27 m) high and was topped with a low slate spire and angle turrets. In 1928, the church council discovered the spire was structurally unsafe. It was removed and replaced with a brick parapet at a cost of £450.

In 1883, the church underwent alterations designed by J. W. Trew and Sons and executed by Messrs. Cowlin and Son. These works included the addition of a new porch and doorway to the south transept constructed of red deal with ornamental hinges, designed to match the existing style.

=== Interior ===
The church was designed to accommodate 700 persons, although 619 free sittings were later recorded. It included a west gallery for 100 children. The nave was aisleless, featuring closely set single-light windows with intricate brick patterning. The interior utilised a double-transept layout, separated from the nave by two arches; the roofs were open-timbered with wind braces. The chancel ceiling was panelled and moulded with carved wooden bosses. The chancel floor was laid with encaustic tiles produced by Maw & Co, while the transepts featured Staffordshire pave tiles.

Upon its consecration in 1870, the church was furnished through various private donations with a stone font, a communion table, and a gallery clock. The reredos featured three arches resting on shafts of Mansfield stone, with the Creed, Ten Commandments, and Lord's Prayer inscribed on a gold background. The church installed an organ by W. G. Vowles in June 1875 at a cost of approximately £320. The instrument featured a great organ (8 stops), swell organ (8 stops), and pedal (1 stop), encased in pitch pine, and opened June 10. On 21 January 1900, a new brass eagle lectern was consecrated in memory of John and Sarah Knight, former parishioners, later stolen in 1974.

On September 23, 1911, a two-light stained-glass window was installed in the north transept in memory of James Hobbs, a long-serving churchwarden. It was designed by Joseph Bell & Sons of Bristol. On March 10, 1922, a window depicting the Parable of the Sower was dedicated in the south transept to the memory of the Rev. William Davies and his wife. This was also executed by Joseph Bell & Sons.

== See also ==
- List of churches in Bristol
