= Easton Comprehensive Redevelopment Area =

Council housing estate in Bristol, England

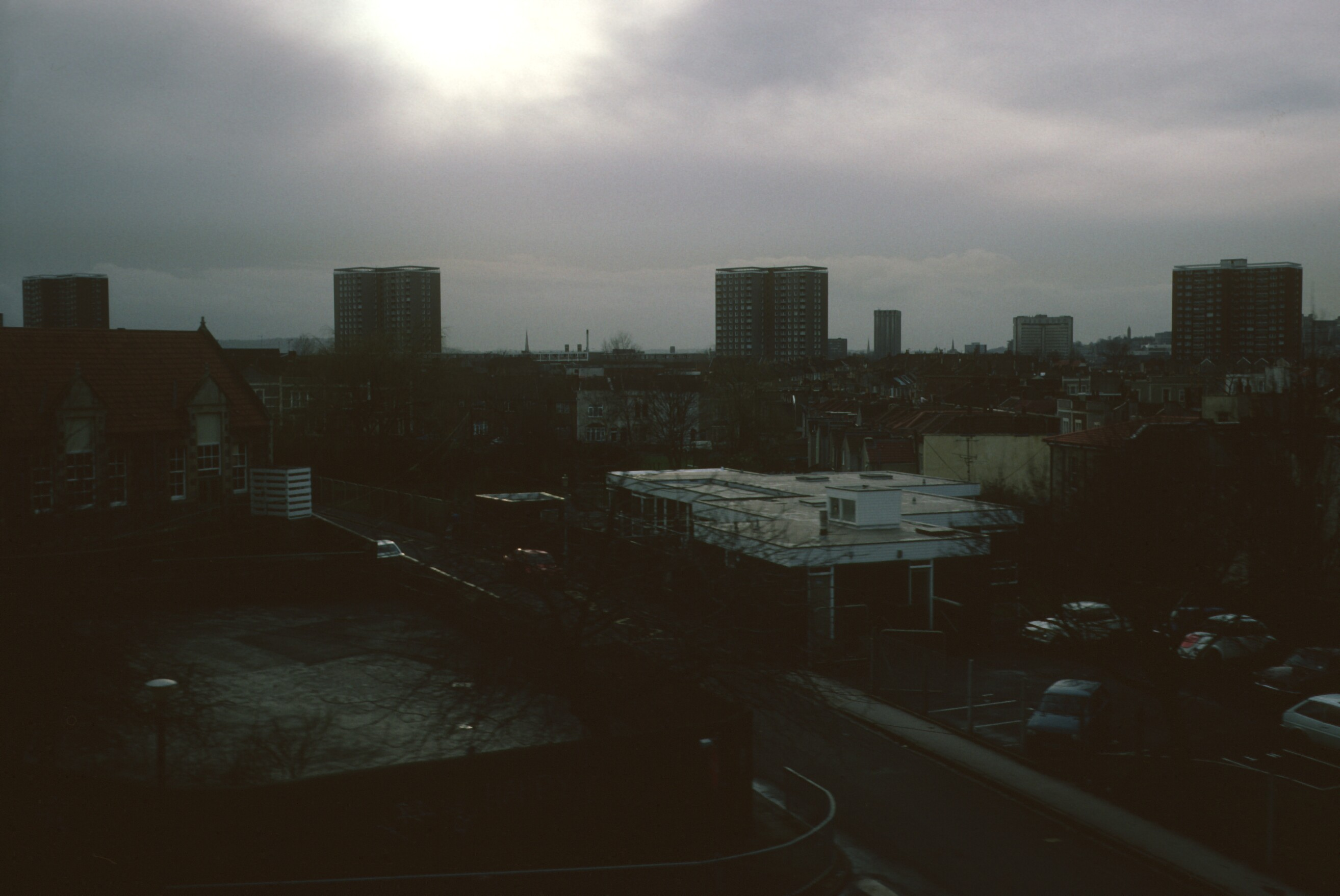
- The four tower blocks of the redevelopment area: Croydon House, Lansdowne Court (former Emra House), Twinnell House, and Rawnsley House
- Interactive map of the Easton Comprehensive Redevelopment Area area

General information
- Type: Tower block and maisonettes
- Architectural style: Modernist
- Location: Bristol, England
- Coordinates: 51.46°N 2.57°W
- Construction started: 19 November 1965
- Completed: 1970s
- Cost: £7 million (1964)
- Client: Bristol Housing Committee
- Owner: Bristol City Council

Design and construction
- Architect: Albert H. Clarke
- Architecture firm: City Architect's Department
- Main contractor: George Wimpey, John Laing Group; Hobbs Quarries Group (concrete)

The Easton Comprehensive Redevelopment Area (CRA) was a major urban renewal project initiated in 1965 by Bristol City Council to replace blighted Victorian terraced housing in Easton with high-density council housing. The project was overseen by the City Architect's Department, led by Albert H. Clarke, and aimed to introduce modern housing standards and segregated vehicle-pedestrian circulation to the district. While the original scheme envisaged a radical transformation of 200 acres (81 ha) of the inner city, the scope was eventually curtailed to 80 acres (32 ha) or less due to shifting political priorities, intervention by the Ministry of Housing and Local Government, and local opposition regarding planning blight.

The extant estate comprises four tower blocks adjoining low-rise maisonettes and additional clusters of townhouses. Upon its approval, it was the largest single redevelopment scheme undertaken by the city, intended to provide modern housing for approximately 7,500 people. The designation remained in use into the 1970s, with a 1973 council proposal describing land near Warwick Road and the M32 corridor as within the Easton Comprehensive Development Area.

== History ==
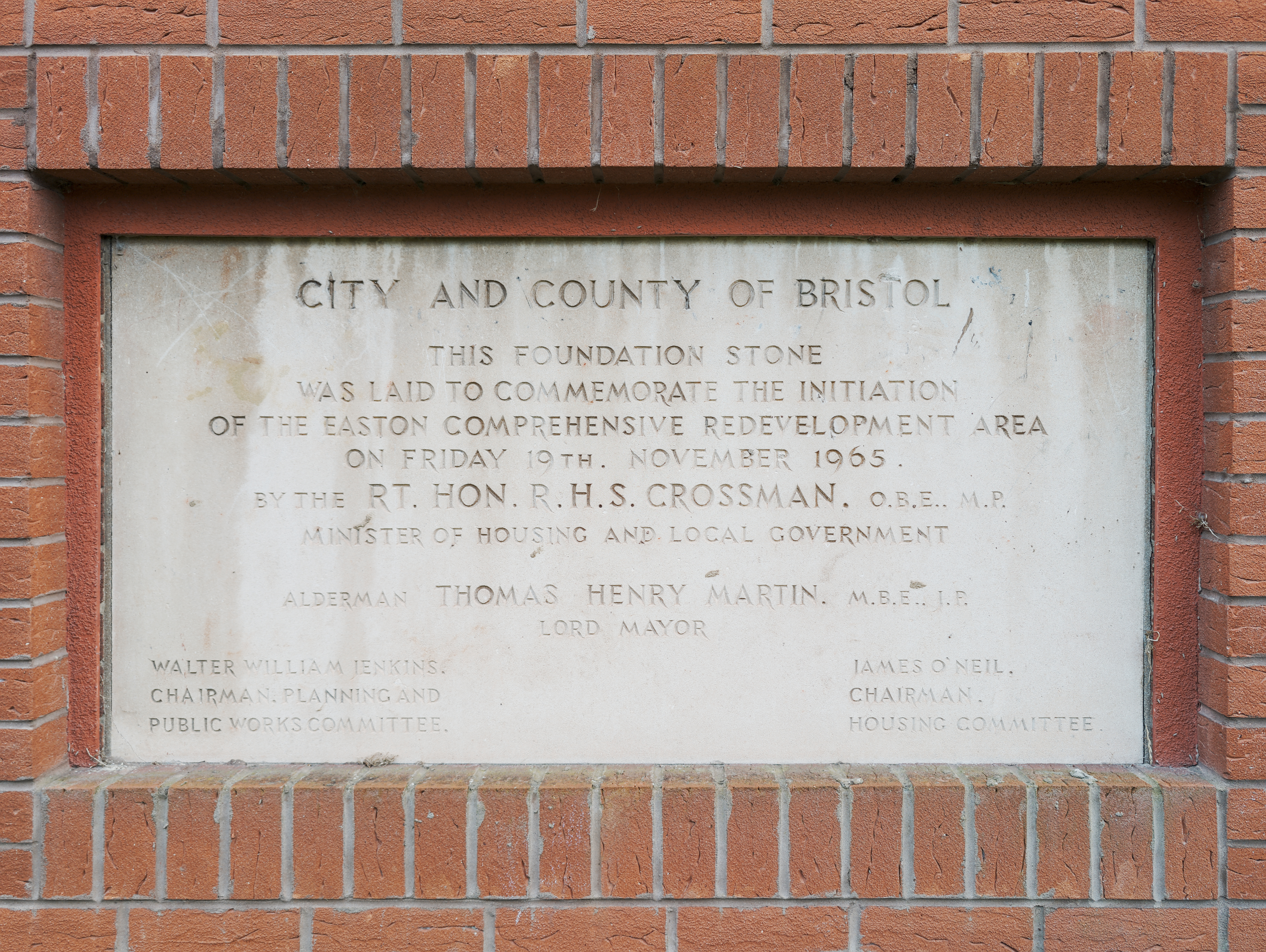
Foundation stone on the north side of Rawnsley House marking the initiation of the Easton Comprehensive Redevelopment Area, laid on 19 November 1965 by the Rt Hon R. H. S. Crossman OBE MP, Minister of Housing and Local Government, with Alderman Thomas Henry Martin MBE JP (Lord Mayor), Walter William Jenkins (Chairman of the Planning and Public Works Committee) and James O'Neil (Chairman of the Housing Committee).

=== Planning stages ===
In February 1959, Bristol Corporation announced its intention to radically alter the layout of Easton, St Paul's, and Baptist Mills, seeking compulsory purchase orders for hundreds of properties. The initial proposal was driven by a desire to rezone areas of Stapleton Road from retail to residential use following the development of the Broadmead shopping district. The council approved the compulsory powers by a 60–33 vote, despite criticism from Citizen Party members like Sir John Inskip, who argued that housing funds should not be used for planning objectives like new roads or car parks.

Social concerns extended to local institutions early in the process. In 1960, schools and community institutions, including St Gabriel's Church, were portrayed as integral to any future "new Easton". Press coverage from the early 1960s described the effects of prolonged clearance on remaining residents in streets affected by redevelopment, including vacant and boarded property attracting trespass, vandalism and fire risk.

In early 1962, city planners outlined a long-term redevelopment concept for Easton that treated the area as a planned neighbourhood unit, with housing (including high-rise blocks) supported by new schools, shops, and public buildings, and a general principle of separating pedestrians from traffic. The plan was framed as a roughly 20-year programme, with the largest changes expected in the first decade and early phases concentrated around the Twinnell Road and Pennywell Road areas. The 1962 outline also anticipated expanded school provision within the area (including nursery places) and described the need for replacement or upgraded local facilities such as a library and medical provision as part of the redevelopment programme.

Opposition to the demolition was immediate. In 1959, the Easton Home Defence Association was formed to oppose the clearance, successfully running a candidate in the local elections that year. The clearance programme also had a measurable political effect in Bristol's municipal elections, as amid unrest in clearance areas and frustration with the dominant two-party system, minor groups briefly broke through. In both 1959 and 1960, the Bristol Ratepayers' Association and the Easton Home Defence Association each won a council seat, in swings larger than were typical of local elections. Bristol's post-war programme of high flats accelerated after the 1960 municipal elections, when the Citizen Party briefly gained control and adopted an explicit slum-clearance platform. In subsequent years the council sought (and received) approval for substantial numbers of high-rise dwellings as part of that clearance drive. In 1962 the Housing Committee agreed to withdraw part of an earlier compulsory purchase order as a "goodwill" gesture, despite professional advice that negotiations for many of the properties had already proceeded on the basis of site value. The same period also saw the council meeting with the newly formed Stapleton Road and Easton Traders' Association to discuss the redevelopment proposals.

By 1963, although the demolition process had begun, the slow pace of clearance drew criticism from local community figures, such as the Rev. Neville Kirby of All Hallows' Church who publicly criticised the "planning machine" for creating planning blight and leaving demolished sites as eyesores. By 1963, a £1 million land acquisition plan was approved, estimated to take 15 to 20 years to complete. Planning chairman Gervas Walker advocated for purchasing properties as they became available to minimise hardship for owners. Social concerns also extended to local institutions, as the Rev. H. Gordon Bulman of St Gabriel's Church campaigned to save the parish school, fearing that redevelopment plans would consolidate the area's three schools into two. By the late 1960s, clearance and rebuilding had begun to produce areas where buildings awaiting clearance were set next the new high-rises, as residents continued moving out for the later stages of clearance.

Delays were attributed to enabling works and central-government funding rules. In 1964, councillors stated that road and drainage works were needed before tenders for early blocks could proceed, but that grant support from the Ministry of Transport was uncertain. The same period also saw disagreements between central departments over which body should fund associated pedestrian-deck works on other schemes, reinforcing local claims that large redevelopment programmes could be slowed by Civil Service approvals and cost-sharing rules.

The uncertainty surrounding the development therefore affected local industry as well as residents. In 1967 builders and manufacturers complained at public inquiries that the "dead hand of town planning" was stifling industrial development, as the council would only grant temporary permissions for factory improvements pending the finalisation of the redevelopment area. Administrative delays further complicated the project, as in 1967 the Ministry of Housing and Local Government refused to grant bulk loan sanctions for demolitions, requiring individual applications for every single house. Town Clerk Thomas Urwin described the ruling as an "administrative nightmare" and threatened to send a deputation to the Civil Service to cut through regulation.

=== Design conflicts and approval ===
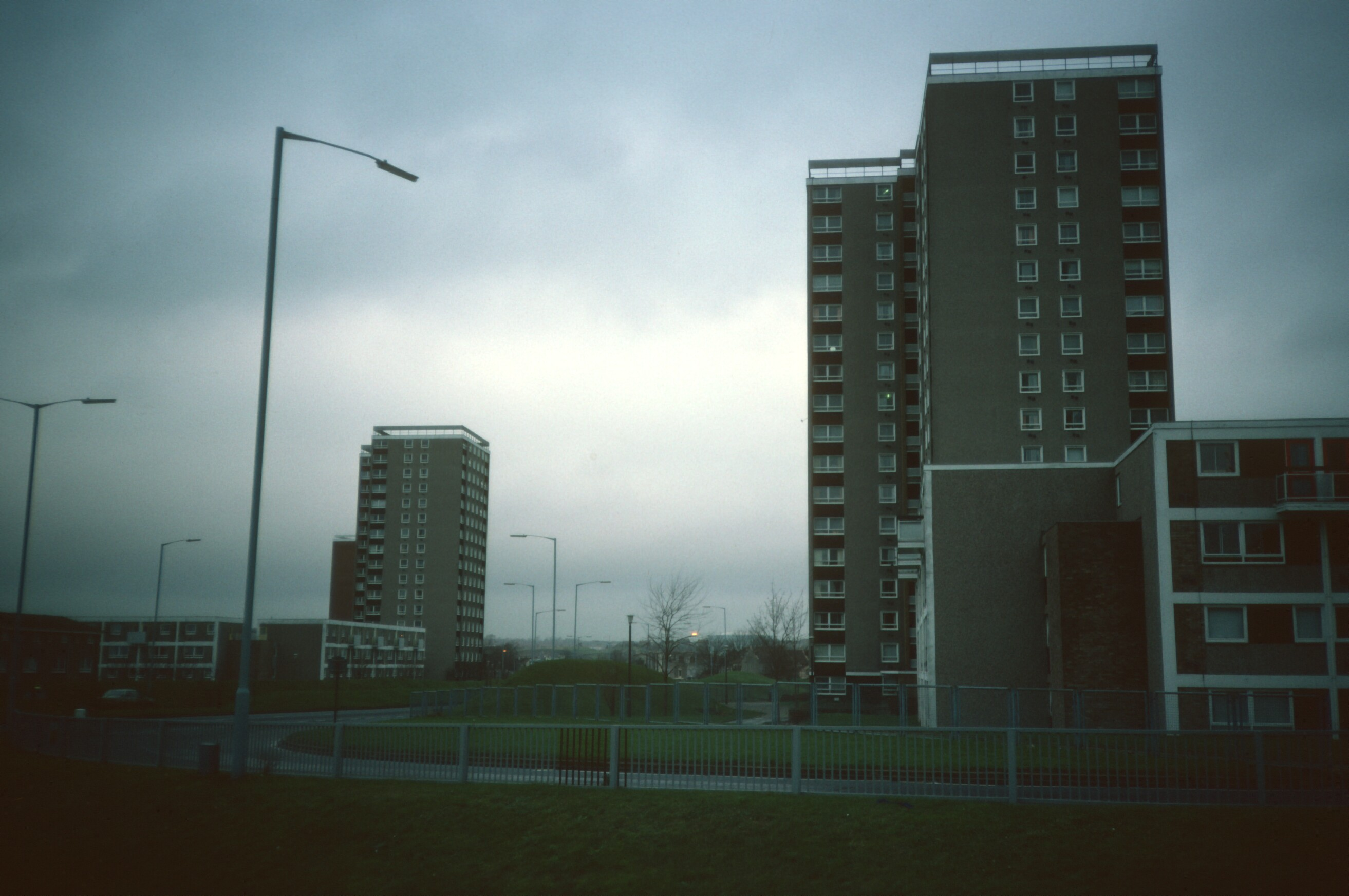
View of Emra House (now Lansdowne Court) and Croydon House

The comprehensive plan, covering approximately 80 acres (32 ha), was formally approved by the Housing Committee in January 1964, with a projected cost of £7 million. The finalised design was the result of a significant compromise between the local authority and the national government. Bristol Corporation had originally intended for 75% of the new housing stock to be contained within high-rise tower blocks to maximise open space. The Ministry of Housing rejected this density, insisting that only one-third of the development consist of towers. Plans were promoted publicly through the city's Permanent Planning Exhibition at Quakers Friars, where a scale model of the scheme was displayed in 1964 to illustrate the new standards. Planning chairman Wally Jenkins denied there was a disagreement with the Ministry, calling the scheme a "reasonable compromise" that offered "wonderful scope to the architectural profession". Gervas Walker abstained from the vote, voicing sociological reservations about the prevalence of four-storey maisonettes over houses. Cost estimates also changed due to these compromises, with the original 1962 proposals were described as a £12 million programme covering 200 acres, but by January 1964 the approved plan was reported with a projected cost of £7 million with lowered acreage.

This enforced reduction in verticality was attacked by the local Citizen Party, who argued the compromise would result in a return to "back-to-back" density. The Citizen Party, which held power in 1960 and again in 1967, attempted to slow the slum clearance programme, but found themselves paradoxically pressured by the Conservative Minister of Housing, Henry Brooke. He had admonished the council to accelerate clearances despite the local party's preference for private enterprise, fearing that medical officers were being discouraged from reporting unfit houses.

Work began in discrete sections. By late 1964, construction of two blocks in the area (described as the Lawrence Hill to Barrow Road area) was reported as "well advanced", with completion anticipated the following autumn, while a further 17-storey block at Sydney Street, the first of the CRA, was described as the next major element in the programme. On 19 November 1965, Minister of Housing Richard Crossman laid the foundation stone at the Sydney Street block, which would later be named Rawnsley House, describing the scheme as a "trend-setter" for the rest of the country due to its sympathetic use of negotiation with owner-occupiers rather than bulk compulsory purchase orders.

=== Criticism ===
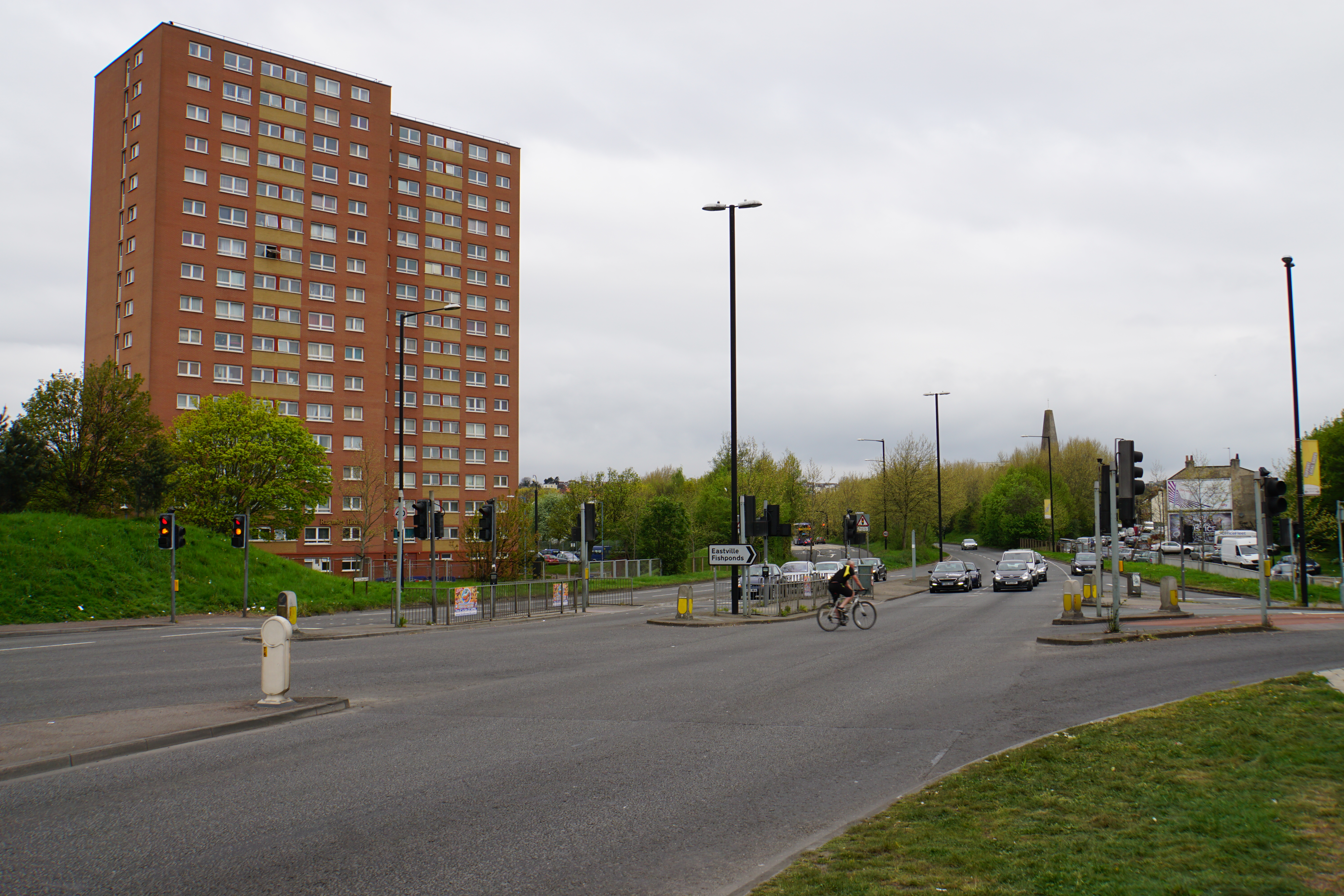
Rawnsley House overlooking Easton Way, part of the Outer Circuit Road

A central tenet of the redevelopment was the integration of the Outer Circuit Road, a proposed urban highway intended to facilitate traffic flow around the city centre. The first stage of this road was designed as a dual carriageway running directly through Easton. By 1971, housing advocates such as the St Paul's Housing Advisory Service were criticising the plan, noting that the road would pass between the new tower blocks and sever the community. Critics argued that the elevated sections of the road would subject the lower floors of the new towers to excessive noise and fumes, and that the layout prioritised car commuters over the residential environment.

Later commentary on the redevelopment by Veronica Smith, a local resident and author, contrasted the improved domestic standards of the new flats, including indoor bathrooms and hot water, with the social experience of high-rise living. She characterised the new area as lacking everyday amenities such as convenient shops, contributing to an impersonal atmosphere and a sense of isolation for residents.

== Architecture and layout ==
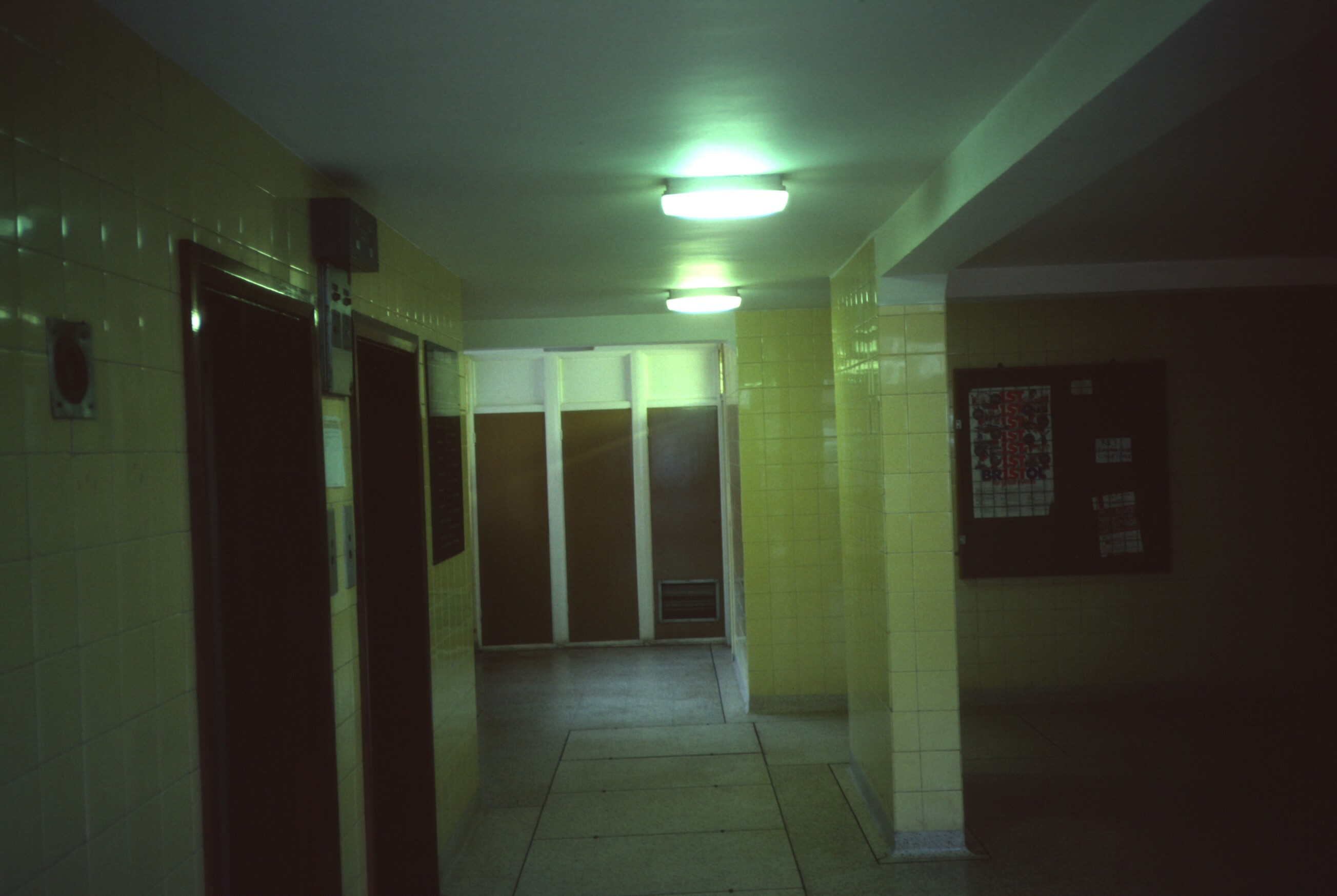
An example of one of the ground-floor communal areas in the blocks, this one being of Croydon House in 1984

The Easton CRA was originally envisioned as a much larger area than it is today, but the general focus on mixed-density housing remained in the finalised scheme. The larger scheme comprised around 200 acres of land, and envisaged a prominent 24-storey tower as a visual landmark, and an elevated section of the proposed Outer Circuit Road passing above a central shopping and public-buildings precinct, with pedestrians intended to move through the area without crossing major traffic streams. The road network and footpath system was also intended to link schools, shops and community facilities while keeping children's routes away from traffic, and proposed integrating everyday destinations into the pedestrian network to support local social life.

As built, the estate combined point-block towers with lower-rise development. The core typology is four high-rise towers linked by elevated skyways to four-storey maisonette blocks, alongside rows of three-storey townhouses on culs-de-sac. This shift to point-block towers reflected Bristol's wider mid-to-late 1960s move away from slab blocks with deck access to freestanding point blocks, while still retaining deck-access elements in the adjoining maisonette ranges. The redevelopment proceeded in discrete pockets (the numbered areas) rather than as a single continuous rebuild, and the programme was not fully uniform. By mid-1967, part of the Easton programme scheduled for 1968–1969 was revised from a multi-storey proposal (including planned towers and four-storey maisonettes) to housing intended for private development.

The main structures were built in reinforced concrete by large contractors active in Bristol at the time, including George Wimpey, John Laing Group and Tersons. Concrete supply came from the Hobbs Quarries Group plant at Rose Green. Discussion at the time also raised the question of industrialised "system building". Central officials encouraged Bristol to look at such methods, including examples overseas, but the council did not proceed with large-scale system-building contracts, instead continuing with more conventional procurement and construction arrangements. Industrialised methods were nevertheless used for some low-rise sections. In 1968, John Laing was awarded a £420,000 contract for 139 houses and maisonettes at Twinnell Road using the Easiform rapid concrete system.

In 2009–2011, some of the blocks were altered by planned refurbishment programmes intended to improve watertightness and insulation, typically combining roof renewals, replacement windows, concrete repairs, and insulated overcladding systems which screened or enclosed balcony lines to reduce cold bridging and condensation. One phase of this programme was delivered by Rok plc within the council's wider housing investment framework, and its collapse in 2010 temporarily halted works before contracts were transferred to Mears Group.

Two other 13-storey tower blocks to the south of the CRA's extent are Kingsmarsh House and Baynton House, once nicknamed the "paintpot towers" for their initial polychrome colour scheme. Both began construction in 1963 prior to the initiation of the redevelopment scheme and were completed in 1965. These were repainted in their current red and cream colour scheme in 1998.

=== Rawnsley House ===
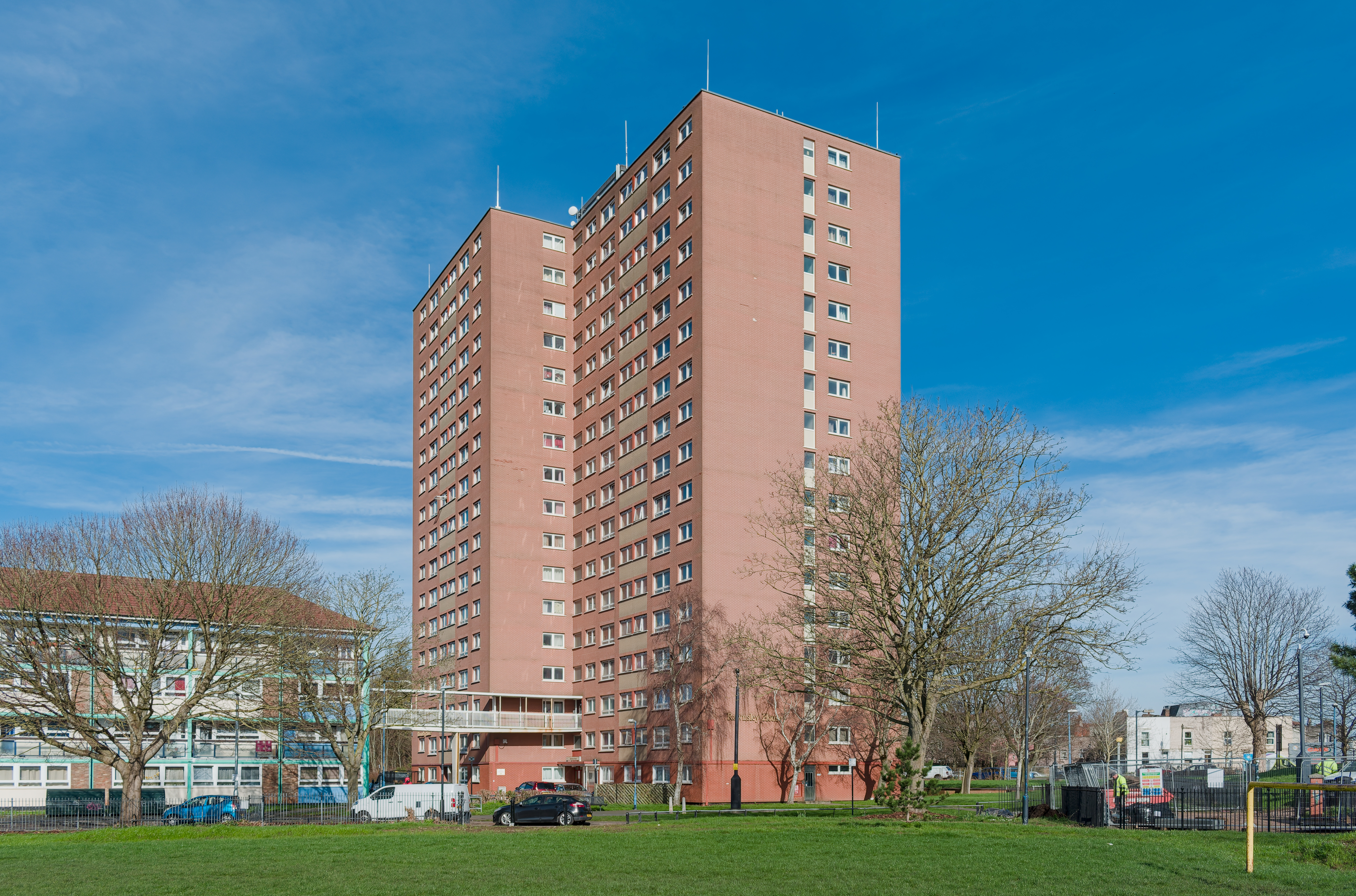
View of Rawnsley House from Beaumont Street

Rawnsley House was built on what was once Sydney Street as part of Area 2 of the scheme at a cost of £406,000. Work on the 17-storey block commenced in April 1965. A foundation stone to mark the initiation of the scheme was installed during the initial stages of the tower's construction. Area 2 also consists of a four-storey maisonette block, and the houses on Barker Walk, Robinson Drive, Hathway Walk, and Bates Drive. In February 1965, the Housing Committee accepted a tender of £406,000 from John Laing Group for its construction, with work commencing in April of that year. The flats were fitted with electric underfloor heating that could be controlled by tenants, but were not permitted to reduce the temperature below 45°F (7°C), a restriction explained at the time as a way to prevent condensation. External television aerials were also not permitted, the block instead being served by a cable relay system provided by Rediffusion (South West) Ltd.

The block contains 131 flats and is linked at the second-storey level by a skyway to the adjacent 50-flat maisonette block. It sits on the north-east edge of its pocket of redevelopment, with the tower set behind Pennywell Road and paired with adjacent low-rise houses arranged along short internal streets and closes. The associated housing is laid out around Robinson Drive and Barker Walk, with broad communal green space between the blocks and small play areas embedded within the estate. Controversy arose over the provision of parking; Councillor Gervas Walker insisted on a "one house, one garage" policy, leading the council to build a £48,000 three-storey car park at the site.

In 2010 the balconies of the tower were screened over with brick-slip installations, as part of a plan to improve the windows of the building. The Georgian wired-glass balconies were thus replaced externally with buff brick. The main contractor was Rok plc and the contractor for materials was Alumasc. The works were part of the Community Energy Saving Programme, and was part of a £65 million contribution by EDF Energy into the programme. It was the first project to be completed as part of the programme.

Following the completion of the redevelopment scheme, an open space was created for Rawnsley House and its vicinity. This was created on blighted parts of Beaumont Terrace and Beaumont Street, which had their terraces demolished. For some time, the area became known as a site for illegal dumping before it was eventually landscaped and officially named Rawnsley House Open Space by 1991, which is today known as Rawnsley Park. A playground has since been fitted, and mosaics designed by local schoolchildren were installed in the 1990s, along with decorative stainless steel gates as part of the Easton Renewal Scheme, from which £80,000 was allotted to the park. The work was executed by local artists Trish McGrath and John Bentley. The playground underwent redevelopment in 2009 as part of the national Playbuilder programme. In 2023 the park received a budget of £153,000 for another refurbishment of equipment, via the Community Infrastructure Levy.

=== Twinnell House ===
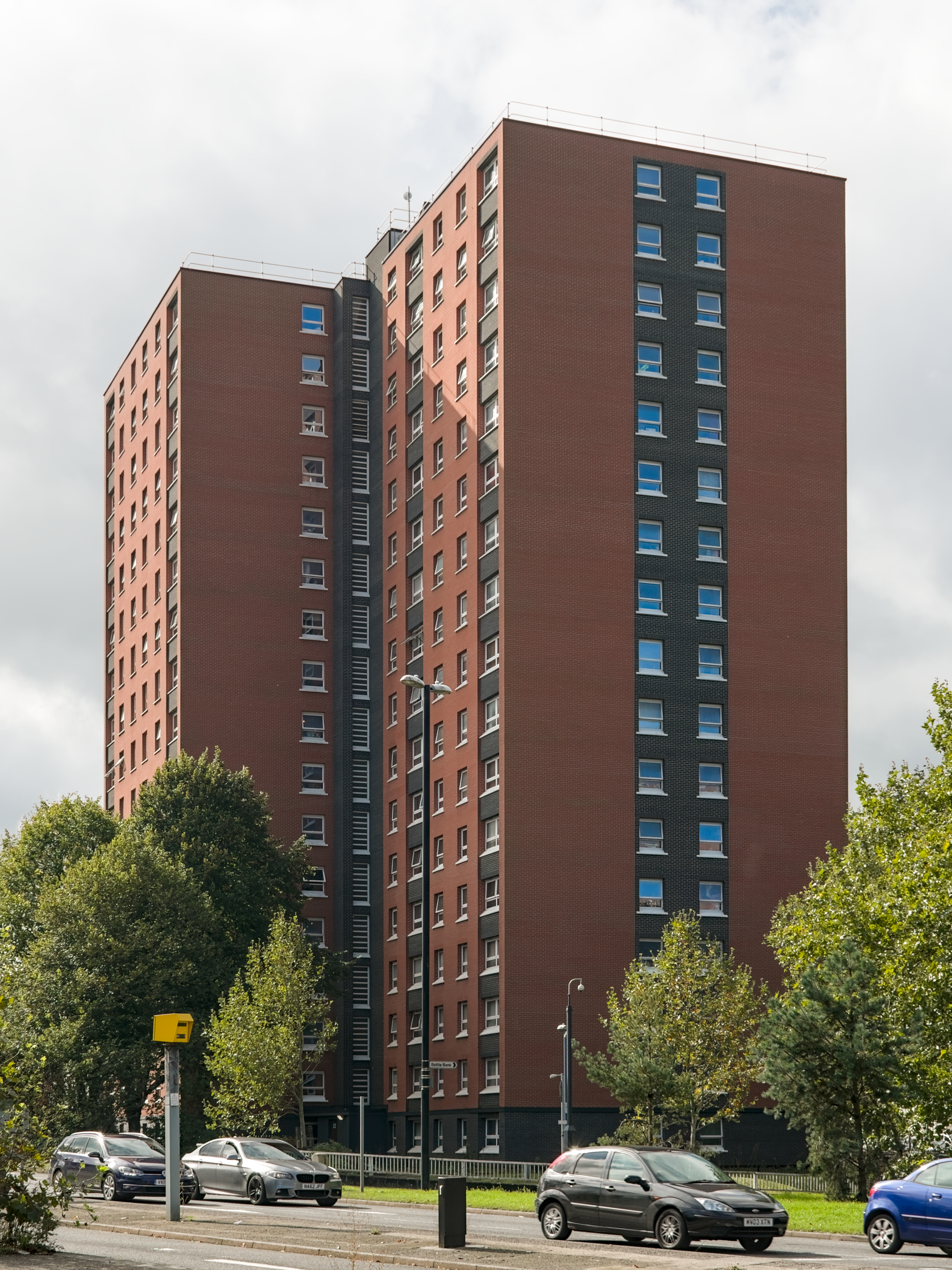
View of Twinnell House from the east side of Easton Way

Twinnell House was built on what was once Twinnell Road as part of Area 5A of the scheme. The building contains 132 flats. The tower anchors a wedge-shaped enclave between Beaumont Street and Easton Way, with the associated low-rise development arranged as courts and short terraces off Willis Drive. Ashman Close and Durbin Walk define the southern and eastern edges of the pocket, enclosing a central green, while a small play area is shown beside the tower's forecourt. The tower was officially opened on 27 June 1968 by the Lord Mayor of Bristol, Mercia Castle. Standing at a height of 49 metres (161 ft), the 17-storey block is designed in a modernist style typical of the era's social housing. It is built with a concrete frame; while the exterior appears to be brick, this aesthetic is achieved through precast concrete panels with a slip finish.

A design statement prepared for later external works described the tower as two offset elements linked around a shared stair and lift core, and described the adjoining low-rise blocks at Wills Drive and Ashman Close as four storeys high, with deck-access walkways serving upper maisonettes. The same source placed the buildings directly beside the A4320 Easton Way and treated the taller elements as sheltering the estate's shared spaces and parking from the traffic corridor. In 2014 a scheme was submitted for external wall insulation and associated envelope works to both high-rise and low-rise elements, including replacement of wired-glass guarding with metal infill panels, alterations to corridor venting to form automatic opening vents, and minor roof-level changes to the plantroom enclosure.

=== Lansdowne Court ===
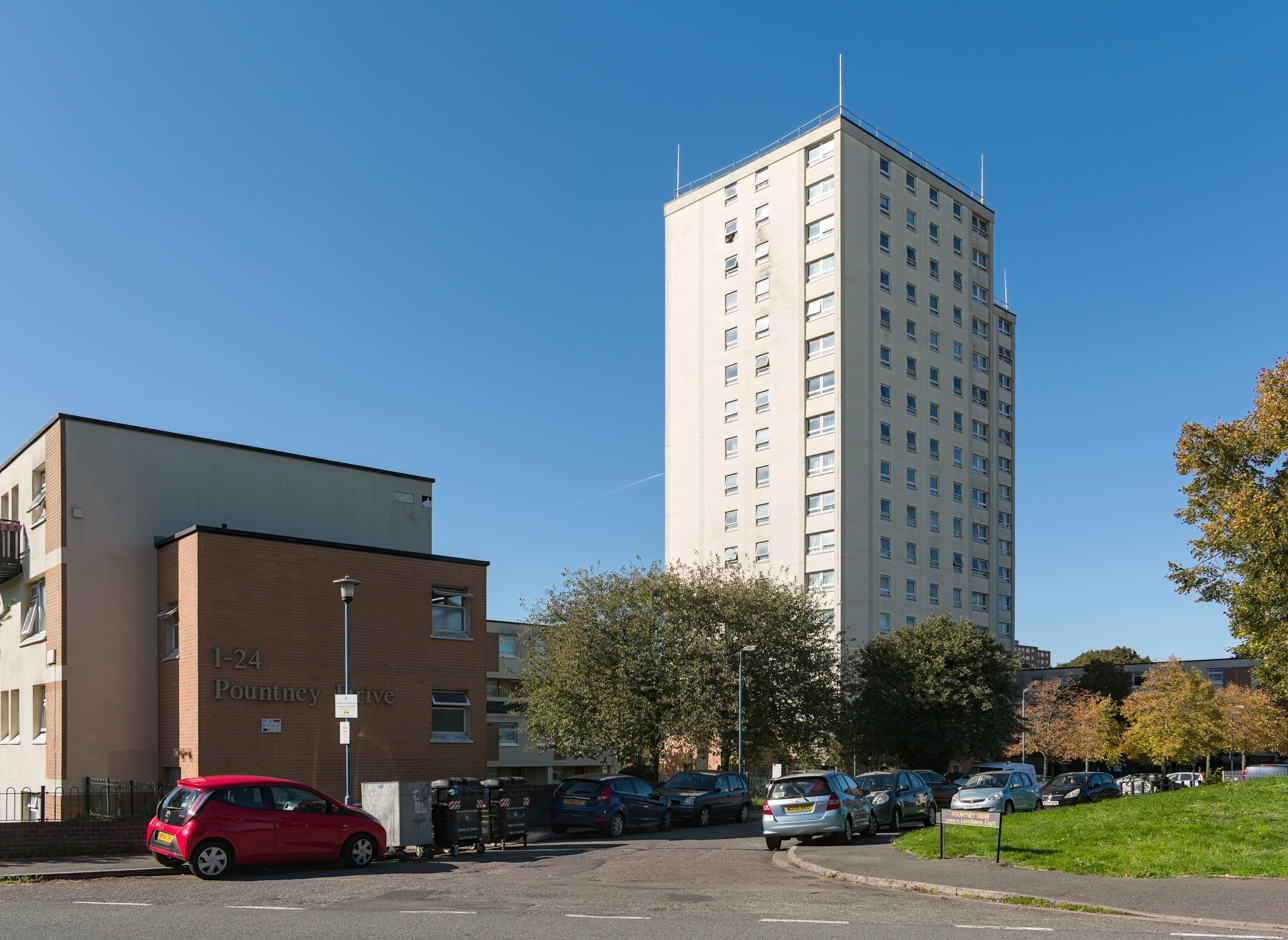
View of Lansdowne Court from Easton Road

Lansdowne Court was originally known as Emra House, and was built on what was once Lion Street as part of Area 3A of the scheme, with construction commencing in 1967. The tower is 49 metres (161 ft) tall and contains 17 floors. Lansdowne Court stands within a broad triangular enclave bounded by Easton Way and Easton Road, with Pountney Drive forming the principal internal access route. The adjoining low-rise housing is arranged in culs-de-sac around a large car park, with a play area and informal green space on the north-west side of the enclave and additional houses grouped on the eastern side. It features a community room which is used for resident meetings and police drop-in sessions. In the 1990s, residents successfully campaigned for a concierge scheme to improve security, though this was later discontinued. Tristan Cork, chief reporter of Bristol Post, included Lansdowne Court in a 2018 polemical feature on buildings he would like to see demolished, using it as a stand-in for what he framed as the wider failures of high-rise council housing, arguing that residents would generally prefer lower-rise homes with front doors onto the street.

In 2009 the tower underwent an external refurbishment intended to improve weathering and thermal performance, including a renewed parapet roof, replacement windows, and an insulated overcladding system. The works were undertaken over around 18 months and included a wider package of upgrades, with rewiring and replacement kitchens and bathrooms carried out alongside the envelope works, and with communal areas redecorated during the project. The window replacement was part of a package including concrete repairs and a new insulated cladding system, undertaken with Rok plc as main contractor.

In 2024 the council announced that Lansdowne Court was among sites selected for a new play area programme in council housing areas across the city.

=== Croydon House ===
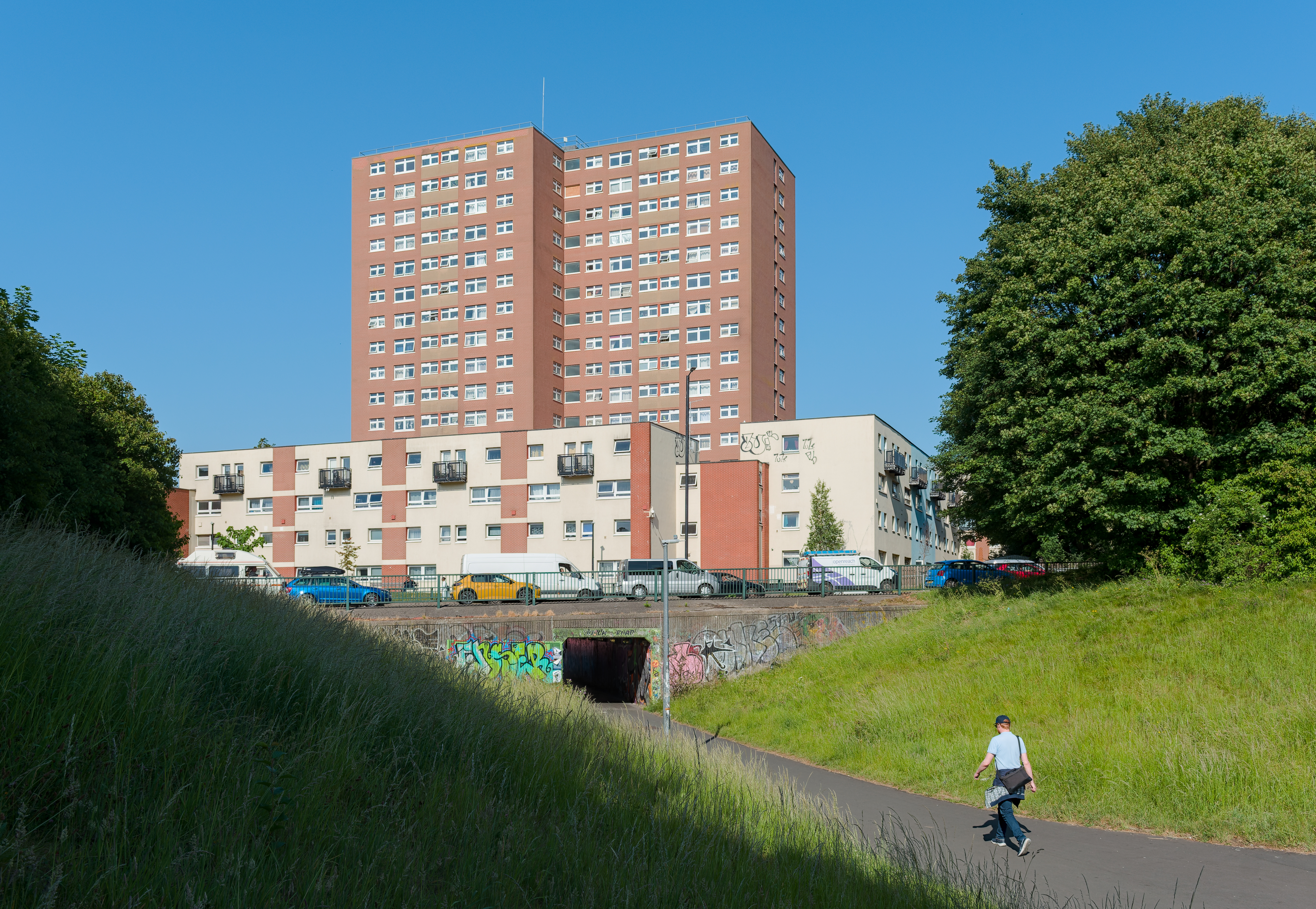
View of Croydon House from the pedestrian area in the centre of the Lawrence Hill Roundabout

Croydon House was built on what was once Leadhouse Road as part of Area 4A of the scheme, with construction commencing in 1966. Croydon House occupies a wedge of redeveloped land between Croydon Street and the grade-separated area at the Lawrence Hill Roundabout. The associated low-rise blocks are grouped along short internal streets, with small communal greens and a play area, while the western edge is defined by the cycleway and multiple subways beneath the road system connecting toward Lawrence Hill Roundabout. Like other blocks in the estate, it has a community room for local use.

In 2010 an external upgrade scheme was submitted for Croydon House which included insulated overcladding and the enclosure of balconies as part of an external wall insulation system. It included the replacement of Georgian wired-glass guarding with an external wall insulation build-up finished in brick slips, creating a flush external skin while retaining the underlying glazed frame structure in place. The same approach was used at Rawnsley House, where balcony lines were also screened behind a buff-coloured brick-slip exterior.

Works at Croydon House formed part of the same wider refurbishment framework being delivered by Rok for Bristol City Council, and were disrupted by the firm's collapse in November 2010, which left the building scaffolded while the council sought a replacement contractor. Work restarted after Mears Group took over the Bristol arm of Rok's social housing operations, with Croydon House part of the resumed programme.

== Social issues and community ==
=== Impact of infrastructure ===
The integration of the Outer Circuit Road (Easton Way) into the residential fabric of the estate drew significant social criticism following its completion. By 1971, community advocates noted that the dual carriageway acted as a physical barrier, effectively "severing" the newly established community. Residents in the lower floors of the tower blocks, particularly those adjacent to elevated sections of the road, were subjected to high levels of noise and exhaust fumes. Critics argued the design prioritised a car-centric lifestyle over the health and environment of the council tenants.

=== Crime and anti-social behaviour ===
In recent decades, the estate has faced challenges related to crime and anti-social behaviour. In 2019, Avon and Somerset Police successfully applied for closure orders for both Twinnell House and Lansdowne Court, restricting access to residents only in a bid to tackle drug dealing in communal areas. The orders were the first of their kind used in this way by the force, following reports of residents having to navigate "uncapped needles and blood on the stairs". Lansdowne Court was also the scene of a fatal stabbing in January 2019. In 2020, residents of Twinnell House reported that drug dealers were attempting to recruit children, leading some parents to send their children to live elsewhere.

=== Fire safety concerns ===
Fire safety has been a major concern for residents, particularly following the Grenfell Tower fire. On 25 September 2022, a fatal fire broke out on the top floor of Twinnell House, caused by a faulty electric bicycle battery. One resident, Abdul Jabar Oryakhel, died after falling from a window while attempting to escape, and eight others were hospitalised. Following this incident and another at nearby Eccleston House in Barton Hill, residents campaigned for improved safety measures. In November 2022, Bristol City Council pledged to speed up a programme to install sprinklers in all tower blocks and replace flammable expanded polystyrene (EPS) cladding on 38 high-rise buildings across the city. Delays to these installations were reported in late 2024, with waking watch patrols extended at a cost of £4.5 million to ensure resident safety in the interim.

== See also ==
- Buildings and architecture of Bristol
- Tower blocks in Great Britain
- Slum clearance in the United Kingdom
