= Waste light concrete =

Type of concrete

Waste light concrete (WLC) is a type of lightweight concrete where the traditional construction aggregates are replaced by a mix of shredded waste materials (thermoplastics, thermosetting plastics, glass, tires, incinerator bottom ash, solid agricultural waste etc.) and a special group of additives. Used in infrastructure and building construction.

== History ==
Concrete products contain a different mix of cement + water + aggregates, depending on desired product quality. With the cost of aggregates and the waste awareness rising, a need to decrease aggregate usage and an alternative way to dispose solid waste arose. Extensive research and development around the early 1960s lead to the realization of the first samples of polystyrene based light concrete products, where the aggregates (rocks and sand mostly) had been largely or in 100% replaced by granulates of plastic materials, or plastic waste. The main problem of this concrete was its soft consistency.

By 1990, a group of engineers formulated (and later patented) the first industrially stable version of the polystyrene concrete by mixing in certain additives. The initially used additives were not health-friendly and cost too much for the product to be financially viable, but the product reached a 3-4 N/mm^{2} compressive strength, which was enough for wall insulation filling. It also proved that the process is possible.

In 2001, in an attempt to commercialize the technology they replaced the binding materials with a health-neutral polymer additive. Laboratory tests were completed on fire resistance and compressive tests. This light polystyrene concrete turned out to be structurally stable, light weight (from 100 to 300 kg/m^{3}) and 100% fire retardant. A request from Argentine lead to the final formulation of the product, where they identified a big problem in pine tree leaf waste and they were interested if it could be used as aggregates. This led to the realisation in 2004 that it is not only polystyrene that could fulfill the purpose, but any small enough solid waste type, therefore any shredded mix of solid wastes.

The patent had been filed in 2015 and awarded in 2017/2018 that covers any possible additive that enables the replacement (fully or partially) of natural aggregates by mixed shredded solid waste granules.

The resulting waste light concrete product covers a group of about 3000 possible final products. Including polystyrene concrete, heavy plastic concrete, incinerated bottom ash concrete, desert sand concrete and many more, which at the time of writing resulted in around 400 samples with different physical qualities. In general, the compressive strength of the final products is between 3 N/mm^{2} to 12 N/mm^{2} with a weight of 100 kg/m^{3} to 800 kg/m^{3}. Traditional gravel-concrete can be 40 N/mm^{2} strong and weigh over 2.000 kg/m^{3}.

== Technology ==
The special additive is produced in a factory and shipped to the site of application in 5–25 kg bags. It is mixed together with cement (100–300 kg/m^{3}), waste materials (1.1-1.2 m^{3}) and water (100-300 liters), plus 5 kg/m^{3} of the additive powder.

Potential waste materials include: ocean waste, fire retardant plastics, thermosetting plastics, computer and phone motherboards, polyfoam, nylon bags, crops, glass and rubber products, incinerated bottom ash and other energy production waste, industrial processing byproducts, packaging materials and many more. Raw materials are shredded to less than 10 mm, do not have to be selected or washed. It is possible to use desert sand or low quality aggregates as main or filling materials.

On the working site, only the traditionally used concrete processing tools are needed for mixing, pumping or casting, which means no extra costs and a very high rate of market availability. The technology replacement cost is nearly zero.

== Circular economy ==
The produced waste light concrete can be 100% recyclable at the end of the product life cycle (or in case of force majeure) by simply shredding the concrete on-site and remixing it into a new batch of waste light concrete for an indefinite number of times.

Laboratory results showed no leeching or other environment polluting effects of the process or the product.

== General usage ==
Not applicable for: weight bearing structural concrete, high-friction contact surface.

Waste plastic road / highway base
House base
Insulating walls
Bricks and blocks
Pre-cast walls

== Comparable waste processing technologies ==
=== Plastic asphalt / plastic road ===
For decades (unknown), asphalt producers include about 0.5% soft plastic in the asphalt mix to increase durability of the road and to decrease at least very little the cost of building road surfaces. Probably the most well known 'plastic road' technology to date, it improves the quality of the top layer of the road. The input plastic types are very limited as they have to melt into the asphalt mix at 165 degree Celsius (thermoplastics), and the technology has a high initial investment and low expandability. As a comparison, plastic road claims to dispose 8–10 kg (or 4-6%) of selected and washed plastic waste in the road surface per tons of asphalt, while waste light concrete can dispose around 800 kg / tons of road base concrete with only low energy consumption shredding and mixing at room temperature. However, these two technologies can be combined in the same stretch of road. It is possible to build plastic blocks as road building units from soft plastics, which is a complex process, and leads to a recyclable road material that has fire hazard risks as it is made from flammable plastic.

=== Plastic bricks ===
Some thermoplastics can be melt and compressed together into solid plastic bricks. The raw materials are very limited, the machinery can be costly and the output speed is also limited by technology. It is possible to DIY hand-compress and oven-melt the bricks, which results in low cost and low output. Another method to store soft household plastic is to compress it by hand into a plastic drink bottle and stack them as building blocks as a no-cost building material.

=== Rubber road base ===
Car tire granulates are used in road base as a stabilizing layer or in small quantities as a binding agent in asphalt. The concrete volume ratio is very small.

== Research ==
There is a large variety of research that has been and continues to be carried out to study the feasibility of waste plastic and other waste materials for usage in lightweight concrete. This only becomes more important as the demand for concrete increases, and continues to exacerbate the catastrophic effects of sand and gravel mining, along with the general carbon emissions that result from concrete production.

=== Plastic-infused concrete ===
The replacement of fine aggregates in concrete (e.g. sand) with plastic naturally will decrease the Young's Modulus and compressive strength of the material, as plastics have lower strength than typical fine aggregates, and their hydrophobic properties decrease their adhesion to the concrete matrix at the interfacial transition zone. This makes plastics suitable for use in lightweight concrete, where compressive strength is less important.

Research has generally shown that a replacement of fine aggregates with plastic by about 10% is optimal for minimizing the strength reduction caused by adding plastic. Other benefits of adding plastic aggregates to concrete include reduction in heat conduction, reduction in density, and increase in fracture energy.

Replacing conventional limestone aggregates with thermoplastics does not have a negative impact on rebars’ corrosion behavior.

Several studies have been conducted to address the issue of plastic's adhesion with the concrete matrix. Studies show that treating plastic aggregate with gamma radiation before adding to the concrete improves compressive strength of the material. MIT students were able to produce concrete that is up to 20% stronger than conventional concrete with this method. Similarly, microwave radiation pre-treatment of PET was shown to improve adhesion with cement paste. Research is also being done to assess the use of air reducing agents to increase adhesion.

=== Other waste materials ===
Aside from plastic, other waste materials can be useful for replacing fine aggregates in concrete, depending on the requirements for specifications such as specific gravity, specific strength, and particle size distribution. Researchers have demonstrated the viability of materials including coconut shell, glass powder, oil palm shell, waste clay brick, wood shavings and sawdust, and various types of ash for this purpose.
