= Rok plc =

British construction company

Rok
- Industry: Construction
- Founded: 1939
- Defunct: 2010
- Fate: Administration
- Successor: Balfour Beatty
- Headquarters: Exeter, UK
- Key people: Stephen Pettit, (Chairman); Garvis Snook, (CEO)
- Number of employees: 4,000 (2010)

Rok plc was a British construction company, based in Exeter. Rok went into administration in 2010.

== History ==
The company, which began trading under the name Exeter Building Contractors Ltd, was formed in 1939 to undertake government contracts being issued at the start of the Second World War. Its effectiveness during the conflict was such that it was decided to continue trading in peacetime. It soon adapted the name EBC Group and acquired several other regional businesses in the ensuring decades.

During 1981, EBC Group joined the Unlisted Securities Market of the London Stock Exchange; it was upgraded to the exchange's official list seven years later. Thereafter, the business expanded into the southern region, opening up an office in Eastleigh to support this and obtaining another in Reading via an acquisition.

The early 1990s proved to be a particularly lucrative era for the firm, generating good returns from both its contracting and property divisions. The decade presented new opportunities for EBC Group, including National Lottery-funded projects and the private finance initiative model.

In mid 2000, shortly following the appointment of Garvis Snook as CEO, the company underwent a major reordering. One year later, the firm was rebranded as Rok; this new name was accompanied by the slogan The Nation's Local Builder.

The early 2000s were a time of considerable growth for the business, which involved a series of office openings and acquisitions, such as the Glasgow-based Retail Maintenance Services, Scottish firm John Dickie Construction, and the southern-focused Llewellyn Group. During late 2003, Rok issued a £116 million bid to acquire rival construction company Galliford Try; however, it was rejected by the board of the latter firm.

During September 2006, Rok purchased the Inverness-based business Tulloch Construction for £31.3 million. All of Tulloch's 875 staff transferred to Rok, included The Corrie Group, Tulloch's engineering, plumbing and electrical division. Two months later, the company launched a restructuring that led to the departure of several senior London-based figured and deemphasised large contracts. One year later, Rok acquired the plumbing and electrical firm Avonside Services in exchange for £16.5 million. In early 2008, it purchased the social housing contractor Richardson Projects for roughly £40.5 million.

The company was negatively impacted by the Great Recession, compelling it to reduce its new-build activities during mid 2009 as its recorded turnover fell by roughly third across the first half of the year. During the following year, Rok issued a profit warning and suspended its head of finance after having identified allegedly serious failings in the firm's financial controls. In response to this fiscal pressure, the company opted to increase the amount of work being performed inhouse where it was feasible to do so.

During November 2010, Rok went into administration after reporting a £3.8 million loss for the first half of the year; it reportedly owed £100 million to its suppliers, and had a £90 million deficit in its pension scheme. The company proceeded to be broken up; Rok's affordable housing and construction businesses were bought by Balfour Beatty for £7 million. Balfour Beatty incorporated the acquires businesses and their 381 employees into Mansell, its regional construction business. A separate branch of Rok emerged as Topcon.
