= Expanded polystyrene concrete =

Construction material

Expanded polystyrene (EPS) concrete (also known as EPScrete, EPS concrete or lightweight concrete) is a form of concrete known for its light weight made from cement and EPS (Expanded Polystyrene). It is a popular material for use in environmentally "green" homes. It has been used as road bedding, in soil or geo-stabilization projects and as sub-grading for railroad trackage.

Before 1980, EPS as the aggregate of concrete has been studied in detail. It is created by using small lightweight EPS balls (sometimes called Styrofoam) as an aggregate instead of the crushed stone that is used in regular concrete. It is not as strong as stone-based concrete mixes, but has other advantages such as increased thermal and sound insulation properties, easy shaping and ability to be formed by hand with sculpturing and construction tools.

After many years of exploration and attempt, EPS lightweight concrete can be used in many building structures, such as EPS insulation coating, EPS mortar, EPS sealing putty, EPS lightweight mortar, EPS concrete inner and outer wall panels, etc. In addition, EPS lightweight aggregate concrete is also used in the fields of pavement backfill, antifreeze subgrade, thermal insulation roof, floor sound insulation and marine floating structure. In particular, it has a strong energy absorption function, so it can also be used as a structural impact protection layer. EPS concrete combines the construction ease of concrete with the thermal and hydro insulation properties of EPS and can be used for a very wide range of application where lighter loads or thermal insulation or both are desired.
