= List of tallest buildings and structures in Bristol =

Tall buildings in Bristol
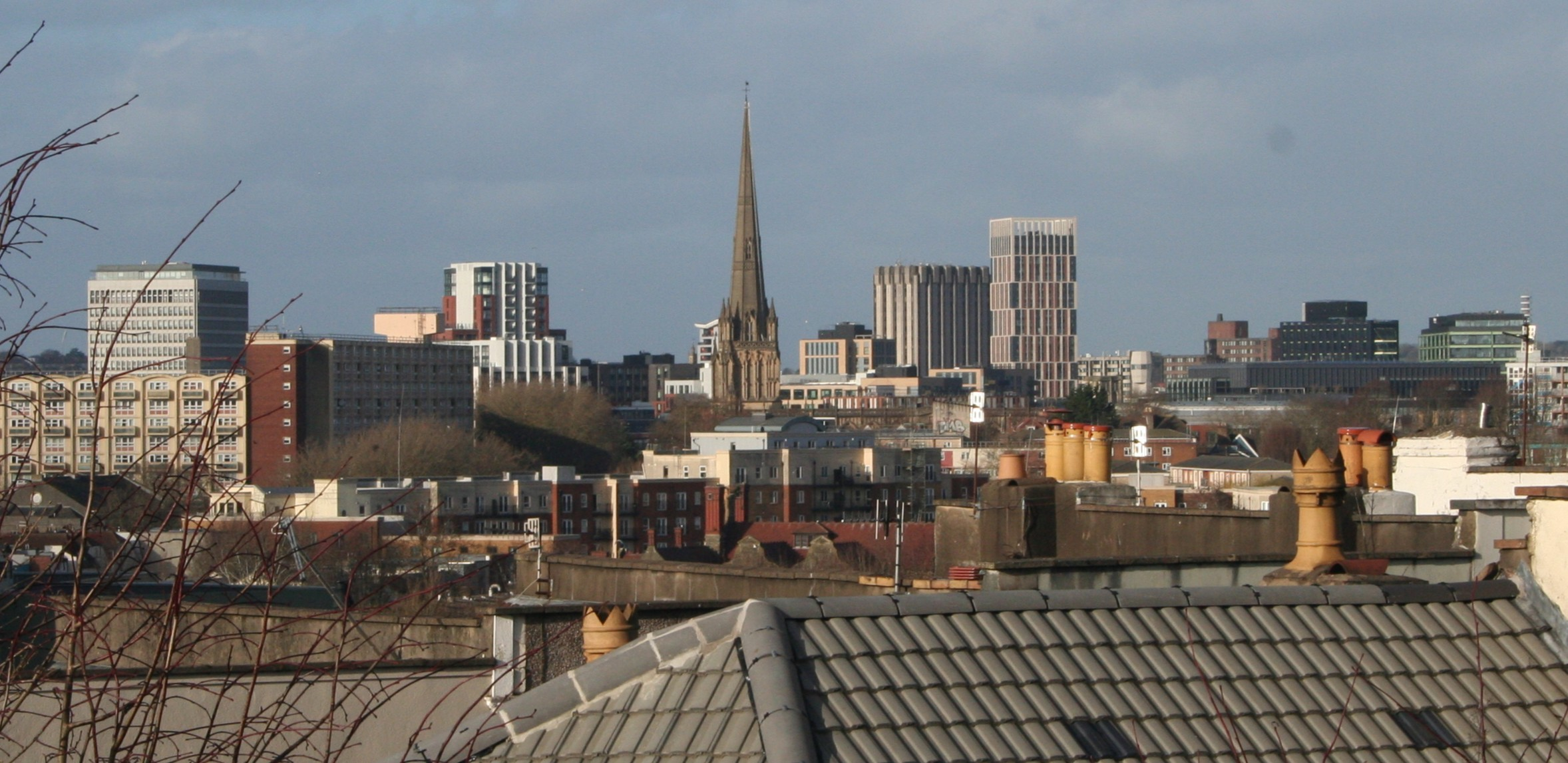
- The Bristol skyline viewed from Windmill Hill in 2026
- Tallest building: Castle Park View (2022)
- Tallest building height: 86.6 m (284 ft)
- Tallest structure: Lawrence Weston Wind Turbine (2023)
- Tallest structure height: 150 m (490 ft)

Number of tall buildings
- Taller than 50 m (164 ft): 27

This list of tallest buildings and structures in Bristol ranks skyscrapers and structures that are at least 40 metres tall in the city of Bristol, England by height.

Bristol is the largest city in South West England and one of the 11 'Core Cities' in the United Kingdom.

Currently, the tallest building in Bristol is Castle Park View. The tower itself has a height of 86.6 m (284 ft), or 98.37 m (322.7 ft) for the top of the structure above ordnance datum (AOD). It has held the city height record since topping out in 2020. The tallest structure in Bristol is a wind turbine in Avonmouth meant for the Lawrence Weston subdivision, at 150 m. It is England's tallest onshore wind turbine and owned by local residents.

The oldest building on the list is St Mary Redcliffe, constructed in 1442, which stands at a height of 80 metres. The church's tower collapsed in 1446, and was reconstructed in 1872. Between 1769 and 1872, the tallest building in Bristol was St Nicholas' Church.

== Completed buildings & structures ==
This lists completed and topped out buildings & structures in Bristol that are at least 40 metres (131 ft). This includes spires and architectural details but does not include antenna masts.

Rank	Name	Image	Height m (ft)	Floors	Year Completed/Topped Out	Primary Use	Location	Coordinates	Notes	Listed
1	Lawrence Weston Wind Turbine		150 m (490 ft)	1	2023	Wind turbine	Avonmouth	51°32′17″N 2°40′26″W	This structure holds the record for England's tallest onshore wind turbine. It is owned by local residents.	No
2	Castle Park View		98 m (322 ft)	26	2022	Residential	Castle Park	51°27′19″N 2°35′08″W	The tower is 86.6 m (284 ft) high in planning documents, or 98.37 m (322.7 ft) above ordnance datum (AOD). The development was also the first to connect to Bristol's district heat network.	No
3	Castlemead		80 m (260 ft)	19	1981	Office	Broadmead	51°27′25″N 2°35′07″W		No
3	St Mary Redcliffe		80 m (260 ft)	3	1442	Religion	Redcliffe	51°26′54″N 2°35′22″W	Previous tallest building in Bristol between 1442 and 1446, until the tower collapsed in 1446. The tower was rebuilt in 1872. It is commonly misquoted as 292 feet (89m), as well as occasionally being mistaken for a cathedral. Also, contrary to popular belief, the weathervane does not count towards its height.	Grade I
4	Redcliff Quarter		73 m (240 ft)	19	2024	Mixed-Use	Redcliffe	51°27′04″N 2°35′22″W	Topped out in 2025	No
5	Purdown Transmitter		70 m (230 ft)	1	1970	Telecommunications tower	Stoke Park	51°29′07″N 2°33′46″W	Also known as Purdown BT Tower.	No
6	Wills Memorial Building		65.5 m (215 ft)	5	1925	Education	Queens Road	51°27′22″N 2°36′17″W	Renovated 2006. Was Built to pay tribute to Henry Overton Wills III, The University Of Bristol's First Chancellor.	Grade II*
7	Eclipse		65 m (213 ft)	17	2007	Retail/residential	Broadmead	51°27′26″N 2°35′11″W	Also known as Harvey Nichols Tower due to the lower floors being occupied by the department store.	No
7	Christ Church, Clifton Down		65 m (213 ft)	5	1885	Religion	Clifton	51°27′28″N 2°37′11″W		Grade II*
8	Beacon Tower		64 m (210 ft)	18	1973	Office	The Centre	51°27′17″N 2°35′51″W	Formerly Colston Tower. The tower was renamed as part a number of renamings across the city. This followed the toppling of the Edward Colston statue in June 2020.	No
8	One Redcliff Street		64 m (210 ft)	16	1964	Office	Redcliffe	51°27′10″N 2°35′26″W		No
9	Fusion Tower		63 m (207 ft)	17	1971	Student accommodation	Lewin's Mead	51°27′26″N 2°35′42″W	Formerly Froomsgate House, renovated 2017	No
10	Timber Yard		62 m (203 ft)	17	2024	Student accommodation	Silverthorne Lane, Bristol Temple Quarter Enterprise Zone	51°27′03″N 2°34′03″W	Topped out in 2025.	No
10	Clifton Heights		62 m (203 ft)	14	1965	Office	The Triangle	51°27′23″N 2°36′30″W		No
11	Radisson Blu Bristol		61 m (200 ft)	17	1967	Hotel	The Centre	51°27′09″N 2°35′48″W	Formerly Bristol & West Building, renovated 2008	No
12	St. Nicholas' Church		60 m (200 ft)	1	1769	Religion	Old City	51°27′14″N 2°35′33″W	Former tallest building until 1872, when the restoration of St Mary Redlciffe spire was complete	Grade II*
12	RAC Regional Control Centre		60 m (200 ft)		1994	Office	Bradley Stoke	51°32′58″N 2°33′27″W		No
12	St Michael's Hospital		60 m (200 ft)	1	1975	Chimney stack	Kingsdown	51°27′36″N 2°36′00″W		No
12	The Bristol Wheel		60 m (200 ft)	N/A	2016	Ferris Wheel	Millennium Square	51°27′01″N 2°35′58″W	Also known as the Bristol Eye (not to be confused with 'The Eye' at Temple Quarter) and officially known as the Skyview Wheel or the SkyView Observation Wheel.	No
13	All Saints' Church		59.5 m (195 ft)	1	1716	Religion	Old City	51°27′17″N 2°35′36″W	Closed in 1984	Grade II*
14	Stafford Yard		59 m (194 ft)	16	2023	Residential	Bedminster	51°26′26″N 2°35′48″W	Topped out in 2024.	No
14	One Bristol		59 m (194 ft)	15	1972	Residential	Lewin's Mead	51°27′27″N 2°35′45″W	Formerly Greyfriars, renovated 2017	No
15	St Paul's Church		58 m (190 ft)	1	1794	Circus (formerly Religion)	St Paul's	51°27′40″N 2°35′05″W	closed in 1988 due to declining congregation. After major restoration starting in 2001, the church reopened in 2005 now owned by Circomedia.	Grade I
15	Assembly Building A		58 m (190 ft)	11	2022	Office	Temple Quarter	51°27′13″N 2°35′04″W	BT Group Office	No
16	The Boatyard		57 m (187 ft)	17	2023	Residential	Totterdown	51°26′34″N 2°34′22″W	The development consists of two floors below streetlevel facing the river. The height excluding these two floors is 49 m.	No
16	Assembly Building C		57 m (187 ft)	12	2023	Office	Temple Quarter	51°27′14″N 2°35′05″W	Topped out	No
17	The Fairfax		55 m (180 ft)	14	1962	Office	Fairfax Street	51°27′21″N 2°35′30″W	Formerly Tower House, refurbishment and renaming completed in 2025.	No
18	Marketgate		53 m (174 ft)	16	1970	Student accommodation	Old Market	51°26′33″N 2°35′56″W		No
19	Northfield House		52 m (171 ft)	18	1969	Residential	Southville	51°26′33″N 2°35′56″W		No
19	Millwrights Place		52 m (171 ft)	14	2023	Residential	Redcliffe	51°27′11″N 2°35′13″W		No
20	Holy Trinity Church		51.5 m (169 ft)	1	1857	Religion	Stapleton	51°28′53″N 2°33′18″W		Grade II*
21	New Bridewell Tower		49 m (161 ft)	16	2017	Student accommodation	Lewin's Mead	51°27′25″N 2°35′36″W		No
21	Whitefriars		49 m (161 ft)	13	1979	Office	Lewin's Mead	51°27′28″N 2°35′41″W		No
21	Clifton Cathedral		49 m (161 ft)	1	1973	Religion	Clifton	51°27′35″N 2°36′59″W		Grade II*
21	Twinnell House		49 m (161 ft)	17	1969	Residential	Easton	51°27′44″N 2°34′16″W		No
21	Croydon House		49 m (161 ft)	17	1969	Residential	Easton	51°27′39″N 2°34′09″W		No
21	Holroyd House		49 m (161 ft)	17	1965	Residential	Windmill Hill	51°26′18″N 2°35′32″W		No
22	Christ Church With St Ewen		48.5 m (159 ft)	2	1791	Religion	Old City	51°27′17″N 2°35′37″W	Best known for its quarter-jacks which were mounted on each side of the church's clock. They were removed in 2013 for restoration but were unfortunately too badly damaged, rendering them unable to be re-erected. Funding for new quarter-jacks began with an appeal in 2018 and the new figures are expected to be installed around 2027.	Grade II*
23	Barton House		47 m (154 ft)	15	1958	Residential	Barton Hill	51°27′14″N 2°33′40″W	First building in Bristol to be classified as a tower block; structural defects found in 2023 requiring evacuation.	No
24	St Stephen's Church		46 m (151 ft)	1	1470	Religion	Old City	51°27′15″N 2°35′46″W		Grade I
24	Avon Point		46 m (151 ft)	14	2024	Student accommodation	St Phillip's Marsh	51°26′53″N 2°34′34″W	Topped out 2025.	No
24	Catherine's House		46 m (151 ft)	14	2019	Residential	Bedminster	51°26′29″N 2°35′44″W	Former office building.	No
25	Bristol Cathedral		44 m (144 ft)	1	1877	Religion	College Green	51°27′06″N 2°36′03″W	Built between 1220 and 1877.	Grade I
25	St Lawrence House		44 m (144 ft)	12	1967	Student accommodation	Broad Street	51°27′20″N 2°35′42″W	Originally built as offices; contemporaneous with other towers in Lewin's Mead.	No
25	Corbett House		44 m (144 ft)	14	1962	Residential	Barton Hill	51°27′19″N 2°33′42″W		No
25	Polden House		44 m (144 ft)	15	1965	Residential	Windmill Hill	51°26′20″N 2°35′38″W		No
26	The Eye		43 m (141 ft)	13	2012	Residential	Temple Quarter	51°27′08″N 2°34′54″W		No
26	Cheese Lane Shot Tower		43 m (141 ft)	4	1969	Office	Temple Quarter	51°27′13″N 2°35′09″W	Formerly a structure, the tower now forms part of an office development called Vertigo.	Grade II
26	Longlands House		43 m (141 ft)	15	1962	Residential	Barton Hill	51°27′22″N 2°33′45″W		No
27	Temple Church		40 m (130 ft)	1	14th century	Religion (until it was bombed)	Redcliffe	51°27′07″N 2°35′17″W	Destroyed by German bombings in 1940 during World War II. Despite the walls and tower still intact, the damages were too severe to be repaired.	Grade II*
27	Ashton Gate Stadium		40 m (130 ft)	N/A	1887	Stadium	Ashton Gate	51°26′24″N 2°37′13″W	Home of both Bristol City F.C. and the Bristol Bears rugby union team. The stadium has a seating capacity of roughly 27,000.	No

== Buildings under construction or approved ==
Height figures are rounded to the nearest metre.

=== Under construction ===
Rank	Name	Image	Height m (ft)	Floors	Year Construction Began	Primary Use	Location	Coordinates	Notes
1	St James House		102 m (335 ft)	28	2025	Mixed-Use	The Bearpit	51°27′33″N 2°35′30″W	
2	Soapworks		81 m (266 ft)	21	2024	Residential	Old Market	51°27′11″N 2°34′50″W	The image is a former soap factory forming part of the development.
3	40-46 Albert Road		64 m (210 ft)		2025	Student accommodation	St Phillip's Marsh	51°26′45″N 2°34′35″W	
4	Freestone Island Block B		43 m (141 ft)	11	2025	Student accommodation	St Phillip's Marsh	51°27′04″N 2°34′26″W	

=== Approved ===
Rank	Name	Image	Height m (ft)	Floors	Year Approved	Primary use	Location	Coordinates
1	Gateway Tower		106 m (348 ft)	28	2024	Mixed-Use	The Bearpit	51°27′32″N 2°35′25″W
2	Cabot Gate		93 m (305 ft)	28	2026	Student accommodation	Cabot Circus	
3	The Galleries Newgate A		91 m (299 ft)	22	2025	Residential	Castle Park	51°27′22″N 2°35′25″W
4	Albert Road		80 m (260 ft)	20	2025	Student accommodation	St Phillip's Marsh	51°26′48″N 2°34′35″W
5	University of Bristol TQEC accommodation		77 m (253 ft)	21	2019	Student accommodation	Temple Quarter	51°26′51″N 2°34′44″W
6	Greystar Rupert Street		76 m (249 ft)	21	2024	Residential	Lewin's Mead	51°27′26″N 2°35′39″W
7	The Galleries F		56 m (184 ft)		2025	Residential	Castle Park	51°27′23″N 2°35′19″W
8	The Galleries B		52 m (171 ft)		2025	Residential	Castle Park	51°27′25″N 2°35′26″W
9	The Galleries Green Street A		51 m (167 ft)		2025	Residential	Castle Park	51°27′23″N 2°35′23″W
10	The Galleries Green Street G		49 m (161 ft)		2025	Residential	Castle Park	51°27′23″N 2°35′22″W
11	Malago Road Building C		42 m (138 ft)		2024	Residential	Bedminster	51°26′23″N 2°35′47″W
12	Malago Road Building B		41 m (135 ft)		2024	Residential	Bedminster	51°26′22″N 2°35′49″W
13	The Galleries Almshouses Square D		40 m (130 ft)		2025	Residential	Castle Park	51°27′26″N 2°35′21″W
14	Dandara Temple Gate			16	2024	Residential	Temple Quarter	51°26′52″N 2°35′00″W

== Demolished ==
Rank	Name	Image	Height m (ft)	Floors	Year Constructed	Year Demolished	Primary Use	Location	Coordinates	Notes
1	Tollgate House		77 m (253 ft)	19	1975	2006	Office	Newfoundland Circus	51°27′34″N 2°35′02″W	
2	Premier Inn Bristol City Centre		60 m (200 ft)	18	1972	2025	Hotel, formerly offices	Bear Pit	51°27′33″N 2°35′30″W	Formerly Avon House.

== See also ==
- Buildings and architecture of Bristol
