= Buildings and architecture of Bristol =

Coordinates: 51°27′N 2°35′W

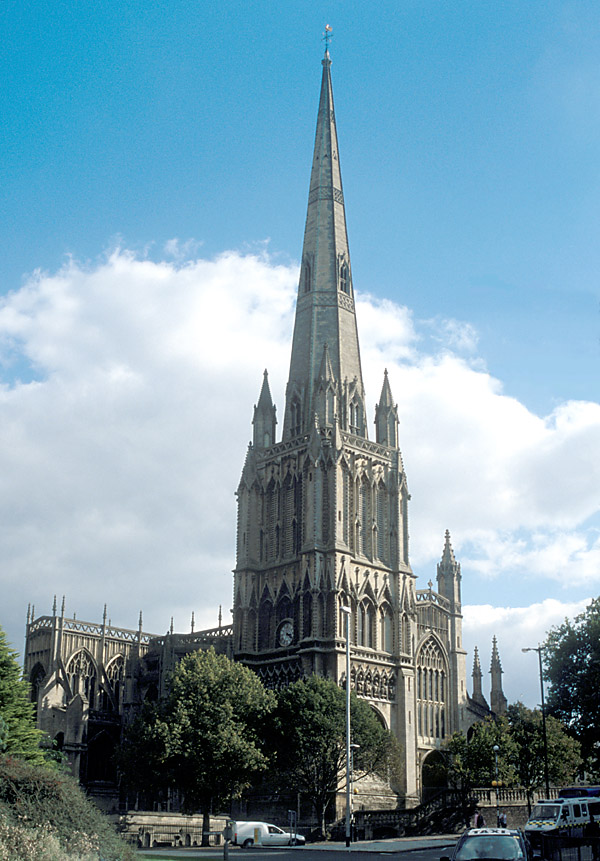
St. Mary Redcliffe from the northwest

Bristol, the largest city in South West England, has an eclectic combination of architectural styles, ranging from the medieval to 20th century brutalism and beyond. During the mid-19th century, Bristol Byzantine, an architectural style unique to the city, was developed, and several examples have survived. Buildings from most of the architectural periods of the United Kingdom can be seen throughout Bristol. Parts of the fortified city and castle date back to the medieval era, as do some churches dating from the 12th century onwards. Outside the historical city centre there are several large Tudor mansions built for wealthy merchants. Almshouses and public houses of the same period survive, intermingled with areas of more recent development. Several Georgian-era squares were laid out for the enjoyment of the middle class. As the city grew, it merged with its surrounding villages, each with its own character and centre, often clustered around a parish church.

The construction of the city's Floating Harbour, taking in the wharves on the River Avon and Frome, provided a focus for industrial development and the growth of the local transport infrastructure. Key elements of which include the Isambard Kingdom Brunel designed Clifton Suspension Bridge and Temple Meads terminus; the latter served from 2002 to 2009 as the British Empire and Commonwealth Museum, but is now closed. The 20th century saw further expansion of the city, the growth of the University of Bristol and the arrival of the aircraft industry. During World War II, the city centre was extensively bombed in the Bristol Blitz. The redevelopment of shopping centres, office buildings, and the harbourside continues to this day.

== 11th – 14th century: Medieval architecture ==
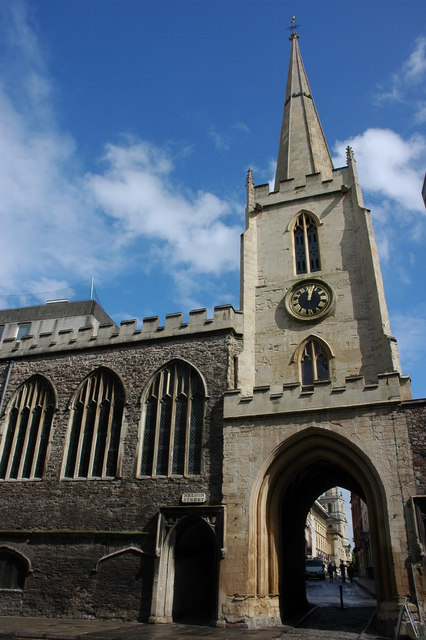
Church of St John the Baptist with the tower over the city gateway.

=== Defensive ===
The city was defended in medieval times by Bristol Castle, a Norman fortification built on the site of a wooden predecessor. The castle played a key role in the civil wars that followed the death of Henry I. Stephen of Blois reconnoitred Bristol in 1138 and claimed that the town was impregnable. After Stephen's capture, in 1141, he was imprisoned in the castle. The castle was later taken into royal hands, and Henry III spent lavishly on it, adding a barbican before the main west gate, a gate tower, and a magnificent hall. By the 16th century, the castle had fallen into disuse, but the city authorities had no control over royal property, and so the castle became a refuge for lawbreakers. In 1630, the city purchased the castle; Oliver Cromwell ordered its destruction in 1656. An area outside the castle, known as Old Market, was used as a mustering point for troops. It later became a market for the country people to set up stalls and sell their wares. Old Market was also the site of an autumn fair. The market may have existed as early as the 12th century, and was the site of the first suburb outside the city walls. It had side roads which could accommodate the traffic on market days.

The city had extensive walls built by Geoffrey de Montbray, Bishop of Coutances. These have now largely disappeared, although parts remain on properties in King Street. A gateway in the old wall can now be seen under the tower of the Church of St John the Baptist.

=== Religious ===
The earliest surviving church in Bristol is St James' Priory in Horsefair, Whitson Street. It was founded in 1129, as a Benedictine priory, by Robert Rufus. The 12th century also saw the founding of All Saints and St Philip and Jacob churches. Temple Church, now in ruins, was built on the site of the oval church of the Knights Templar, a Christian military order forcibly disbanded in 1312. At this time, the church was rebuilt to serve as a parish church.

Bristol Cathedral was founded as St Augustine's Abbey in 1140 by Robert Fitzharding, along with its associated school, with the building works continuing in the Gothic style until about 1420. St Mark's Church was built around 1220. Soon after, the foundations were laid for Holy Trinity Church in Westbury on Trym. The 12th century also saw the foundation of St Mary Redcliffe, renowned as one of the finest examples of the 15th century Perpendicular style, and the tallest building in the city. Elizabeth I, on a visit to the city in 1574, described it as the "fairest, goodliest and most famous parish church in England". These 12th-century churches were followed in the 14th century by the construction of Church of St John the Baptist and St Stephen's Church. Westbury College was a 13th-century College of Priests located in Westbury-on-Trym. A gatehouse was added in the 15th century, which is now a National Trust property.

=== Tudor period ===
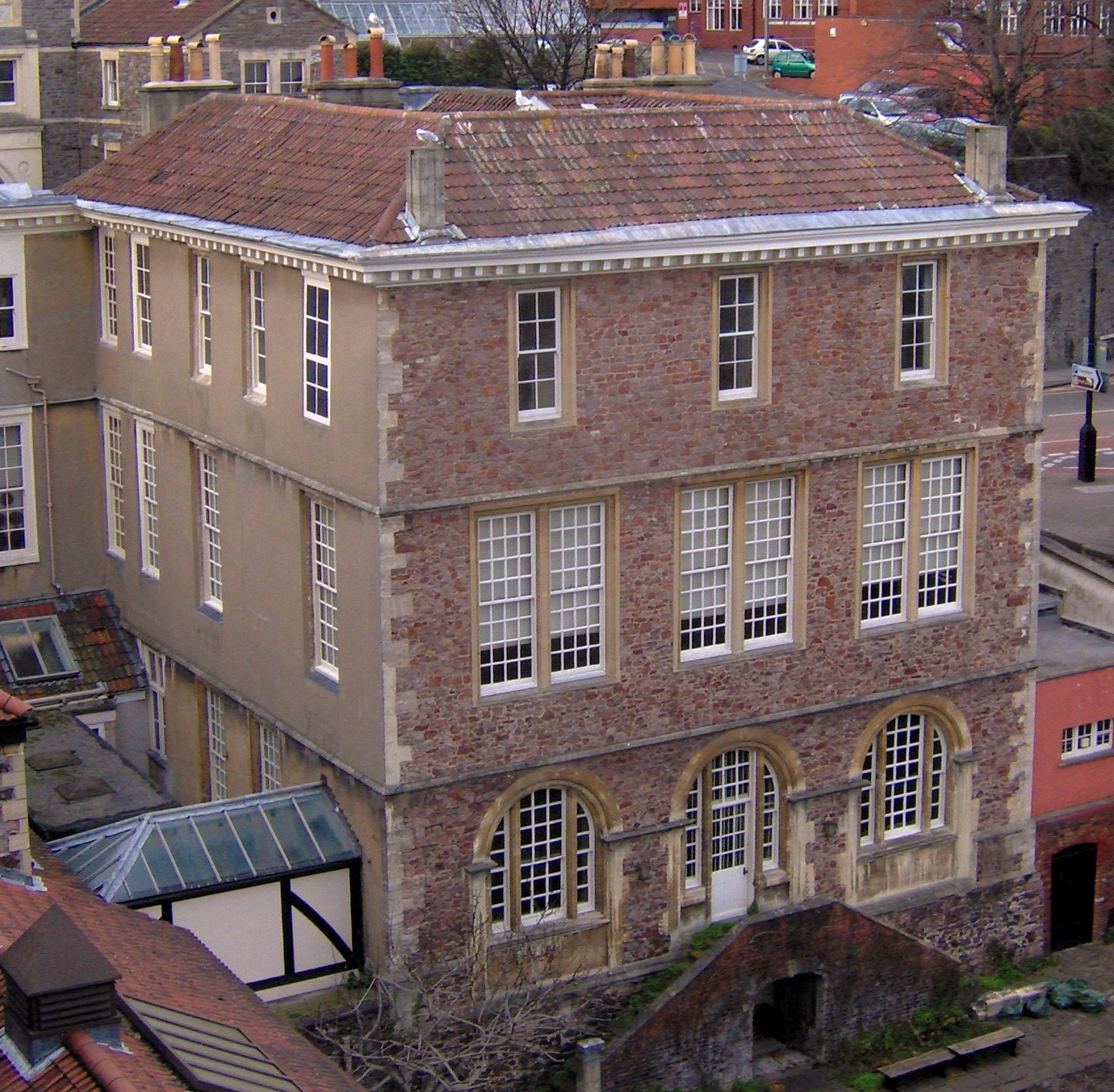
Red Lodge.

The Tudor period, which lasted from the late 15th century into the early 17th century, saw the increasing development of the city's mercantile class, whose members gained much of their wealth from the trade passing through Bristol Harbour. They built houses financed by their trade, and reflective of their wealth and status; such as Ashton Court, essentially a country house although only two miles from the centre of the city, or Red Lodge in the city itself, built in 1580 for John Yonge as the lodge for a great house that once stood on the site of the present Bristol Beacon.

During the English Civil War, the Royal Fort was considered the strongest part of Bristol's defences, and it was to the fort that the Royalists retreated when they found themselves under siege from the Parliamentarians. It fell to the parliamentary forces in 1645 and was subsequently demolished. St Nicholas's Almshouses were built in 1652 to provide care for the poor. Several public houses were also built in this period, including the Llandoger Trow on King Street and the Hatchet Inn. More churches were built, including St Michael on the Mount Without. It served the St Michaels hill area, one of the first areas outside the city walls to be colonised by the wealthy merchants who were by then trying to escape the overcrowded and unhealthy conditions in the city centre. The city was by this time beginning to expand rapidly beyond its traditional city walls, and the surrounding villages were starting to become suburbs, such as the villages of Horfield and Brislington. Both had their own churches, the Church of the Holy Trinity with St Edmund and St Lukes.

== 17th – 19th century: Style revivals ==
=== Stuart period ===
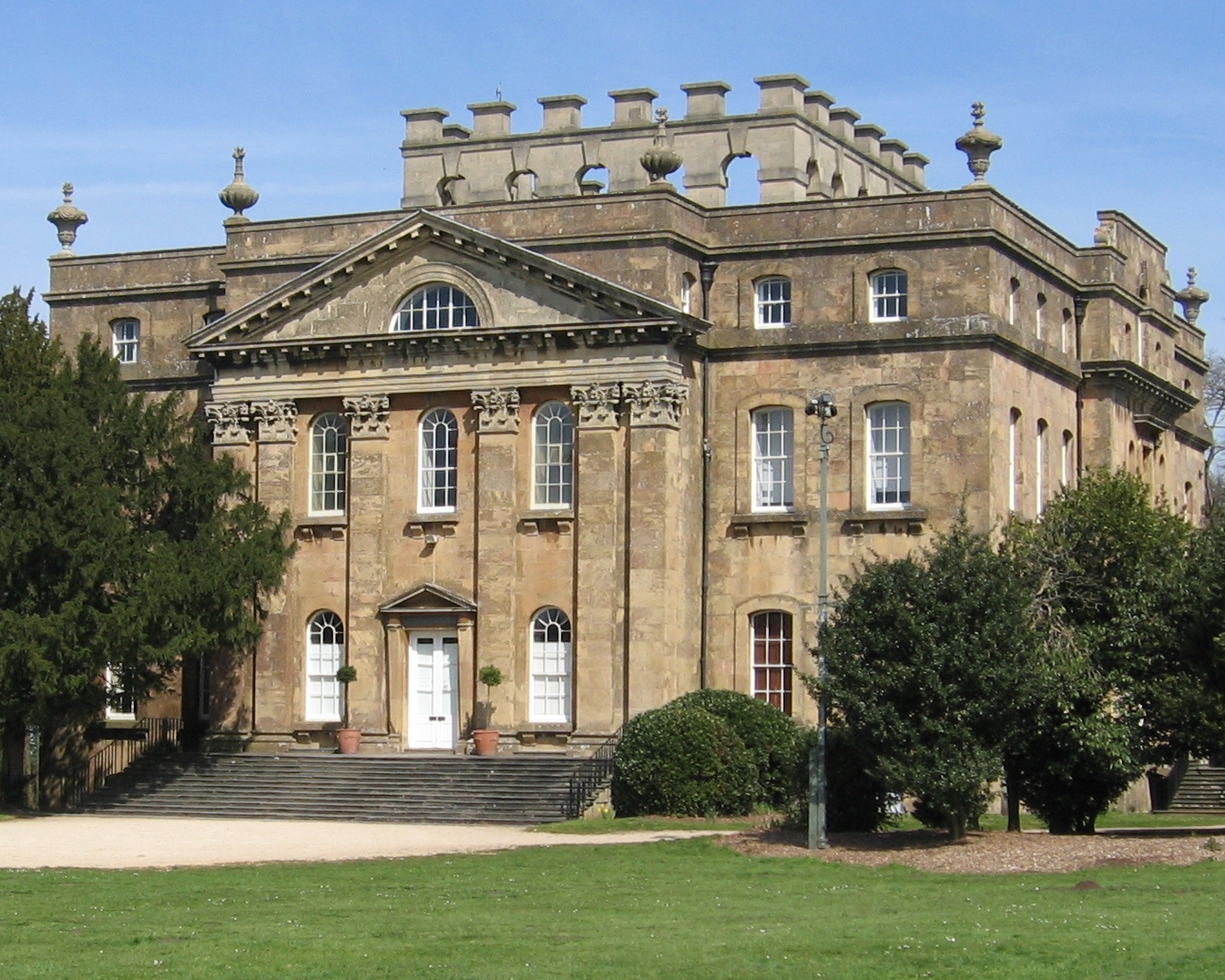
Kings Weston House.

The Stuart or English Baroque period (1666–1713) saw more expansion of the city. Large mansions such as Kings Weston House and Goldney Hall were constructed. The needs of the poor and destitute became the responsibility of institutions such as Colstons and the Merchant Venturers Almshouses. The King Street area was developed outside the "Back Street Gate" of the city, home to the King William and Naval Volunteer Public Houses. The nearby Queen Square was planned during this era.

In 1669, a series of four flights of steps, now called Christmas Steps, was constructed to replace a steep, muddy, and narrow street formerly known as Queene Street. Many of the larger houses of this period, including Queen Square, were built for merchant families who were heavily involved in the slave triangle, importing goods from slave plantations. A few African and creole (American- and Caribbean-born) slaves came to Bristol as servants.

=== Georgian period ===
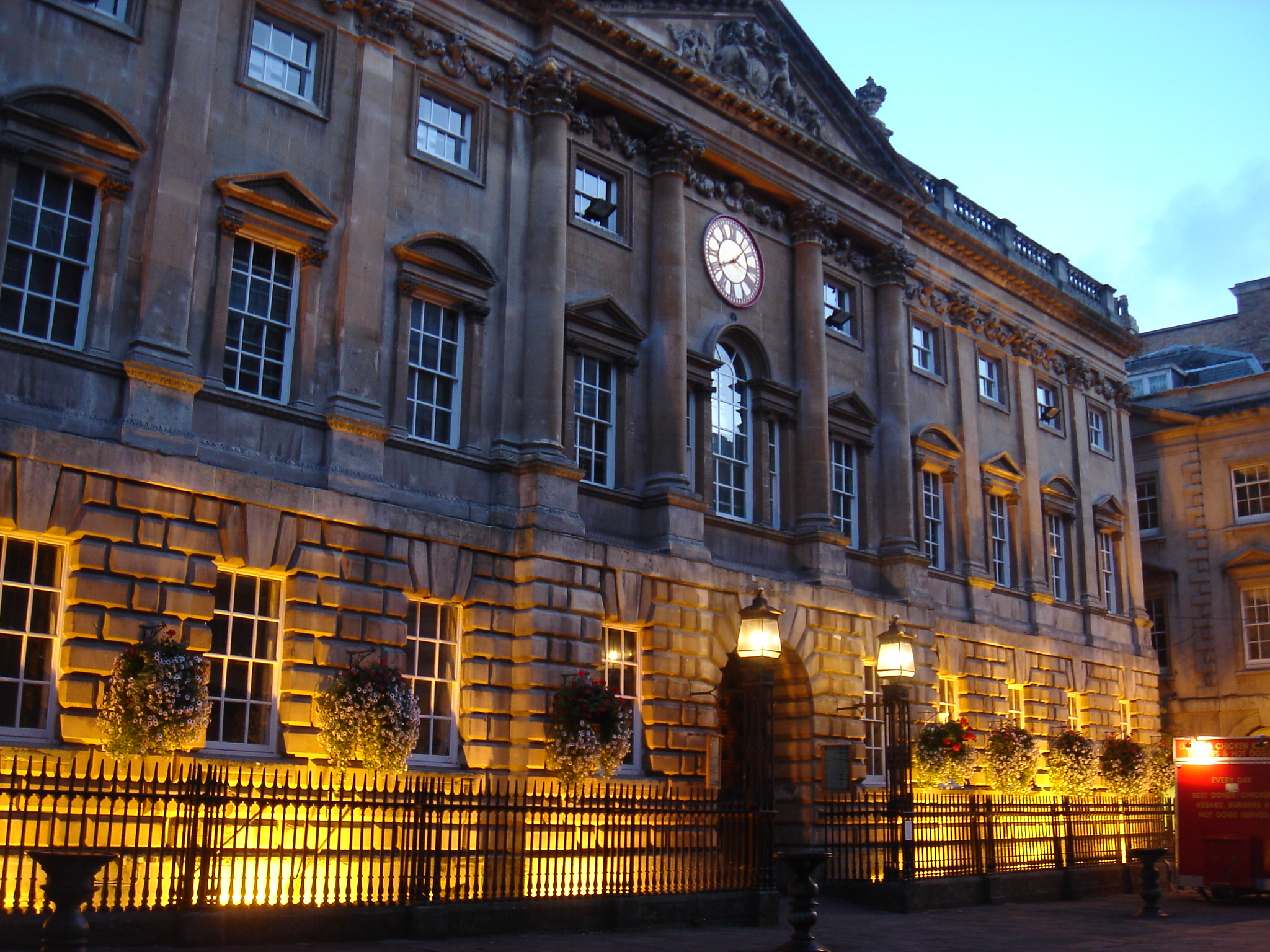
The Exchange, a historic market used as a corn exchange

In 1732, John Strachan built Redland Court for John Cossins. It now forms one of the buildings making up Redland High School for Girls. In 1760, the Bristol Bridge Act was carried through parliament by the Bristol MP Sir Jarrit Smyth. That led to the demolition of St Nicholas's Gate, along with much of the original St Nicholas Church. The original bridge was a medieval wooden structure, lined with houses on both sides.

A 17th-century illustration shows that these were five stories high, including the attic rooms, and that they overhung the river much as Tudor houses would overhang the street. At the time of the Civil War the bridge was noted for its community of goldsmiths, who may have been attracted by the unusually secure premises. The current St Nicholas church was rebuilt in 1762–9 by James Bridges and Thomas Paty, who rebuilt the spire. Part of the old church and town wall survives in the 14th century crypt. The 1766 Theatre Royal, which claims to be the oldest continually operating theatre in England, joined with the Coopers' Hall, from 1744 and designed by architect William Halfpenny, to form the Bristol Old Vic.

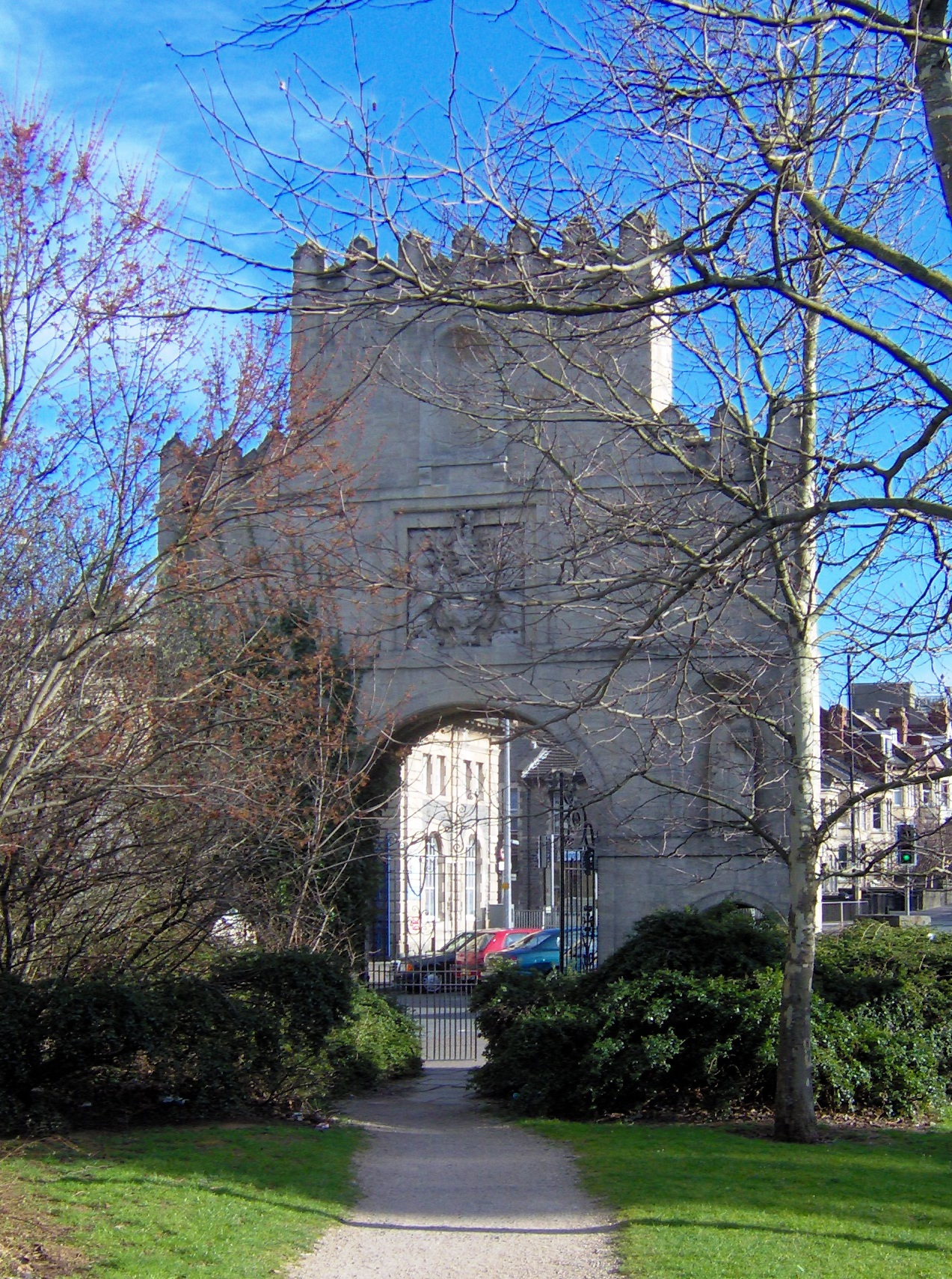
Arno's Court Triumphal Arch.

During the period of Georgian architecture (c. 1720–1840) the main architects and builders working in Bristol were James Bridges, John Wallis, and Thomas Paty with his sons John and William Paty. They put up hundreds of new buildings, reflecting the increased prosperity that came with the new Floating Harbour and trade based at The Exchange, built in 1741–43 by John Wood the Elder. Their early work included the Royal Fort, Blaise Castle House and Arno's Court estate, with the associated Arno's Court Triumphal Arch and Black Castle Public House. More modest terraces and squares grew up in the new suburbs such as Hotwells and north into Clifton, including 7 Great George Street, now the Georgian House Museum. It was built around 1790 for John Pinney a successful sugar merchant, and is believed to be the house where the poets William Wordsworth and Samuel Taylor Coleridge first met. It was also home to Pinney's slave, Pero, after whom Pero's Bridge at Bristol Harbour is named.

In addition to evidence of the wealth brought by the slave trade there are several significant links to the abolitionists. Bristol's Hannah More was an influential member of the Society for Effecting the Abolition of the African Slave Trade. In the Seven Stars Public House Thomas Clarkson collected evidence for William Wilberforce on the cruelty of the trade in humans. Bristol Cathedral contains several memorials to people active in the abolition cause, including a bust of Robert Southey. John Wesley opposed the trade in humans and in 1774 his sermon at the New Room against slavery was disturbed by explosion. Several plays adopted by the abolitionists were performed at the Bristol Old Vic, including Oroonoko, the story of an enslaved African and The Padlock, which was praised by Clarkson for its importance to the abolition cause.

Several residential squares with terraces of three-storey houses were laid out around central gardens. An example is Portland Square, which was built between 1789 and 1820, and is now largely occupied by offices. In the 1830s, much of Queen Square was rebuilt following damage caused during the Bristol Riots, and to the north of the city, Kings Square. The most fashionable areas were at the top of the hill, as in wet weather the cesspits overflowed down the hill. Further development, though in a less formal manner, continued along the radial roads to Stokes Croft and Cheltenham, towards Horfield and in the St Phillips, Redcliffe and Bedminster areas. Religious needs in the expanding city were met for several denominations with Redland Chapel and other Church of England buildings appearing, including Christ Church and St Werburghs. Whitefield's Tabernacle, Kingswood was the first Methodist chapel and a Quaker meeting house known as Quakers Friars was built in 1749.

=== Regency period ===
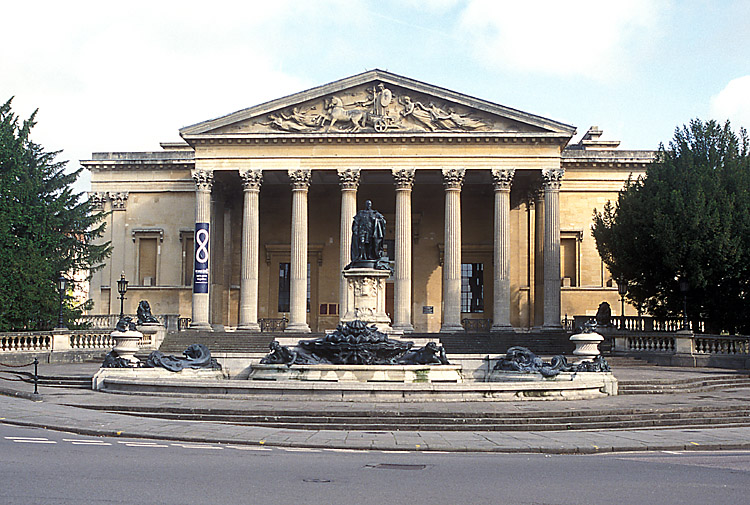
The Victoria Rooms.

The term Regency architecture refers primarily to buildings of the early 19th century, when George IV was still prince regent, and also to later buildings of the Victorian period which were designed in the same style. It follows closely on from the neo-classical Georgian style of architecture, adding an elegance and lightness of touch. Many buildings in the Regency style have a white painted stucco facade and an entryway to the main front door—usually coloured black—framed by two columns. Regency houses were typically built as terraces or crescents, often in a setting of trees and shrubs. Elegant wrought iron balconies and bow windows were also fashionable. An instigator of this style was John Nash, whose most notable work in Bristol is Blaise Hamlet, a complex of small cottages surrounding a green. It was built around 1811, for the retired employees of Quaker banker and philanthropist John Scandrett Harford, who owned Blaise Castle House. The cottages are now owned by the National Trust.

The Clifton and Cotham areas provide examples of the developments from the Georgian to the Regency style, with many fine terraces and villas facing the road, and at right angles to it. In the early 19th century, the romantic medieval gothic style appeared, partially as a backlash to the symmetry of Palladianism, and can be seen in buildings such as Bristol City Museum and Art Gallery, Royal West of England Academy, and The Victoria Rooms. St Mary on the Quay church was built between 1839 and 1843, by Richard Shackleton Pope, as a Catholic apostolic chapel for the Irvingite congregation: it is now a Roman Catholic church.

=== Victorian period ===
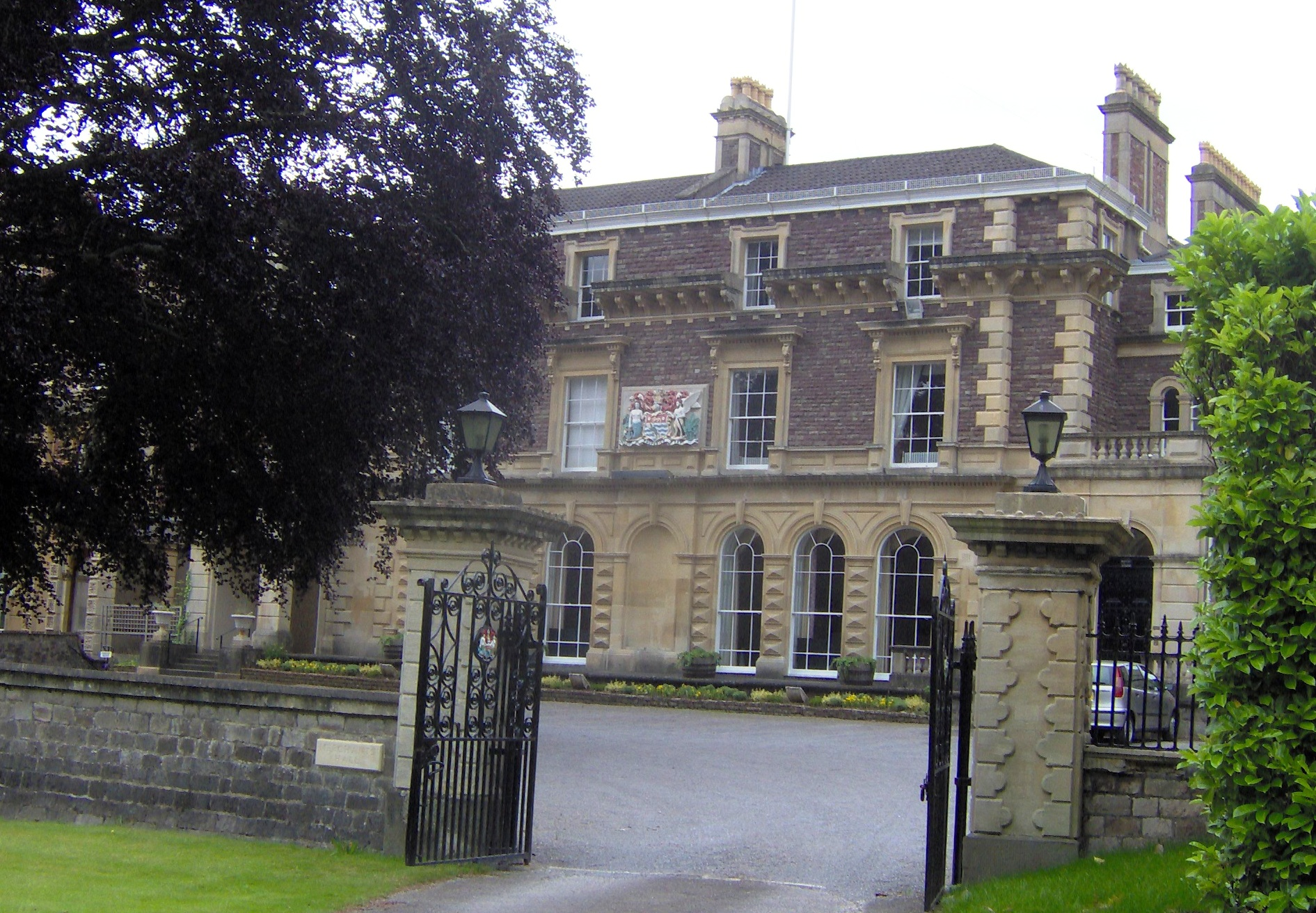
Merchant Hall, Clifton Down.

The Victorian era saw further expansion of the city, both in its industrial heartland around the docks and in the suburbs, particularly in Clifton. Between 1849 and 1870, five large stone buildings were erected by George Müller to care for 2,050 orphans in his Ashley Down orphanage. Cabot Tower is situated in a public park on Brandon Hill. It was built in 1897 by William Venn Gough in memory of John Cabot, 400 years after he set sail from Bristol and landed on what is now Canada.

Palatial squares were developed for the prosperous middle classes. Italianate and Grecian villas, made with Bath Stone and sitting in their own gardens, were built in areas such as Clifton Down. At the same time, hundreds of acres of working class and artisan homes were built, especially in the south and east of the city. To support the growing population, public service buildings such as the Beaufort Hospital (now Glenside), schools such as Clifton College and public houses such as the Mauretania Public House were constructed.

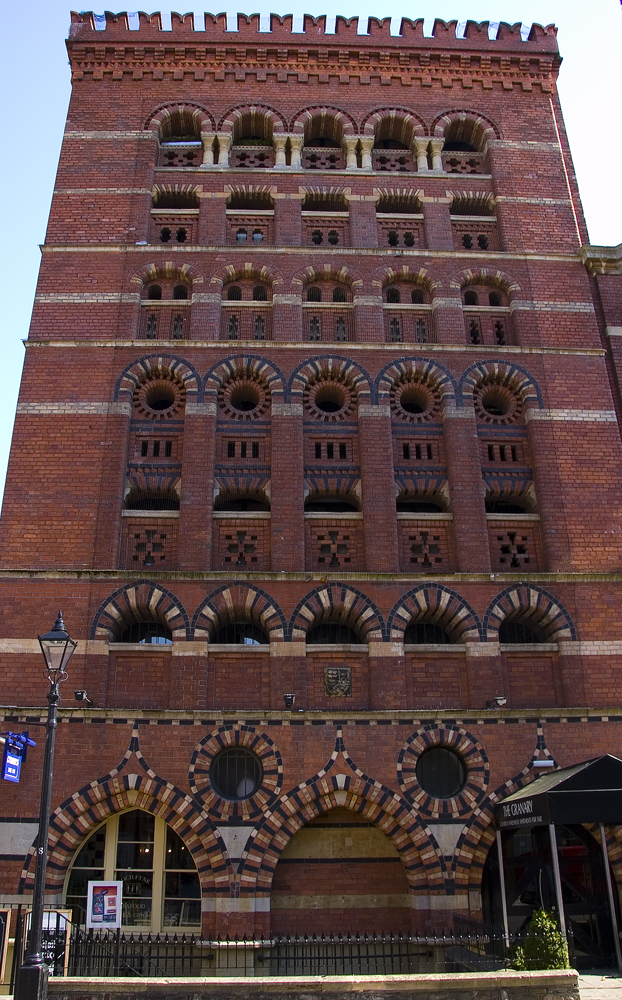
The Byzantine style Granary.

A notable feature of Bristol's architecture is the Bristol Byzantine style. Characterised by complicated polychrome brick and decorative arches, this style was used in the construction of factories, warehouses and municipal buildings built in the Victorian era. Surviving examples include the Colston Hall, the Granary on Welsh Back, and the Gloucester Road Carriage Works, along with some of the buildings around Victoria Street. Several of the warehouses around the harbour have also survived, including the Bush House, which now houses an art gallery. Clarks Wood Company warehouse, the St Vincent's Works in Silverthorne Lane, and the Wool Hall in St Thomas Street, are other survivors from the 19th century. An alternative approach is exemplified in Edward Everard's printing works with its detailed ceramic frontage, which was constructed in 1900.

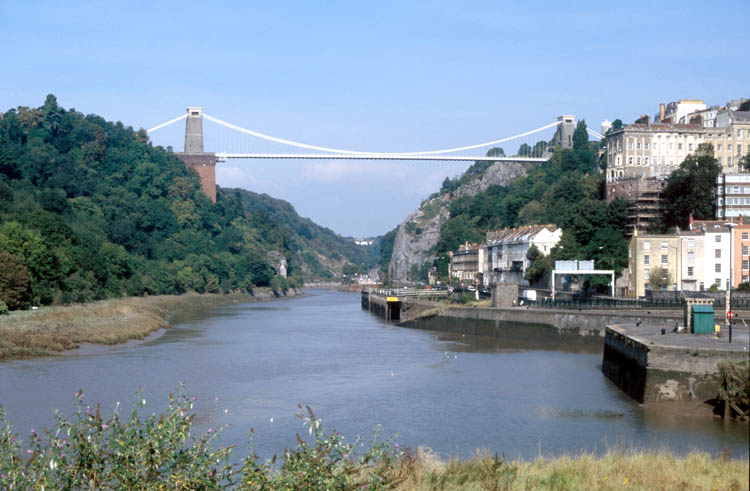
Clifton Suspension Bridge.

The local Pennant sandstone is frequently used as walling material, often with limestone dressings, as found on the old Temple Meads railway station and Clifton Down railway station. Pennant sandstone is also used as large rock-faced squared blocks, described as Pennant rubble, which are used alone, eked out with plain brickwork, or incorporated into the more rugged examples of Bristol Byzantine. Much of the local transport infrastructure including the Clifton Suspension Bridge and the original Temple Meads railway station—now used as the British Empire and Commonwealth Museum—were designed or built by Isambard Kingdom Brunel.

== 20th – 21st century: Modern period ==
=== 20th century ===
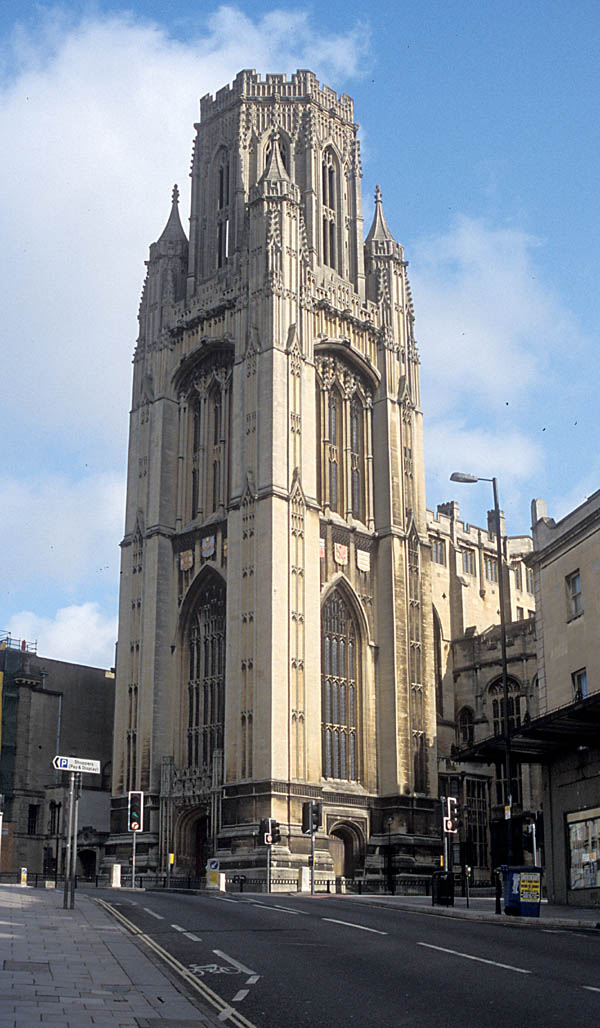
Wills Memorial Building.

In the early part of the 20th century further expansion took place in residential districts increasingly distant from the city centre. Bristol Hippodrome was designed by Frank Matcham, and opened on 16 December 1912.

The Wills Memorial Building was commissioned in 1912 by George Alfred Wills and Henry Herbert Wills, the magnates of the Bristol tobacco company W. D. & H. O. Wills, in honour of their father, Henry Overton Wills III, benefactor and first Chancellor of the University of Bristol. Sir George Oatley was chosen as architect and told to "build to last". He produced a design in the Perpendicular Gothic style, to evoke the famous university buildings of Oxford and Cambridge. The university also took over several existing houses such as Royal Fort, Victoria Rooms, Clifton Hill House, Goldney Hall, Wills Hall and buildings on Berkeley Square, Park Street and the surrounding areas. Oatley was also involved in the design or restoration of other buildings in Bristol in the early part of the 20th century, including the restoration of John Wesley's original Methodist chapel, the New Room.

The 1930s saw the construction of the Employment Exchange and the planning of the new Council House, although this was not completed until 1956. As a centre of aircraft manufacturing, Bristol was a target for bombing during the Bristol Blitz of World War II. Bristol's city centre suffered "enormous" damage with around 25 per cent of the medieval city being completely destroyed. The original central area, near the bridge and castle, is now a park featuring two bombed-out churches and fragments of the castle. A third bombed church has been given a new lease of life as the St Nicholas' Church Museum. Slightly to the north, the Broadmead shopping centre was built over bomb-damaged areas.

In 1938, as the city prepared for major civic projects and increasing design workloads, Bristol City Council created the post of City Architect and formed a dedicated architectural department to centralise work that had previously been divided between departments. The appointment attracted wide interest, with 99 applications received for the new role, with John Nelson Meredith ultimately being the first appointee.

After the Blitz, the city architect's department became closely involved in the execution of post-war rebuilding schemes, including the planning and phased construction of Broadmead as a new retail centre, alongside extensive municipal housing and school building programmes. Major civic projects credited to the department in the 1950s included the rebuilt interior of the Colston Hall (1951), the redevelopment of Barton Hill with high-rises, and the original terminal building at Bristol Airport (1957). In 1958, Barton House was built as part of the city architect's programmes, becoming Bristol's first tower block.

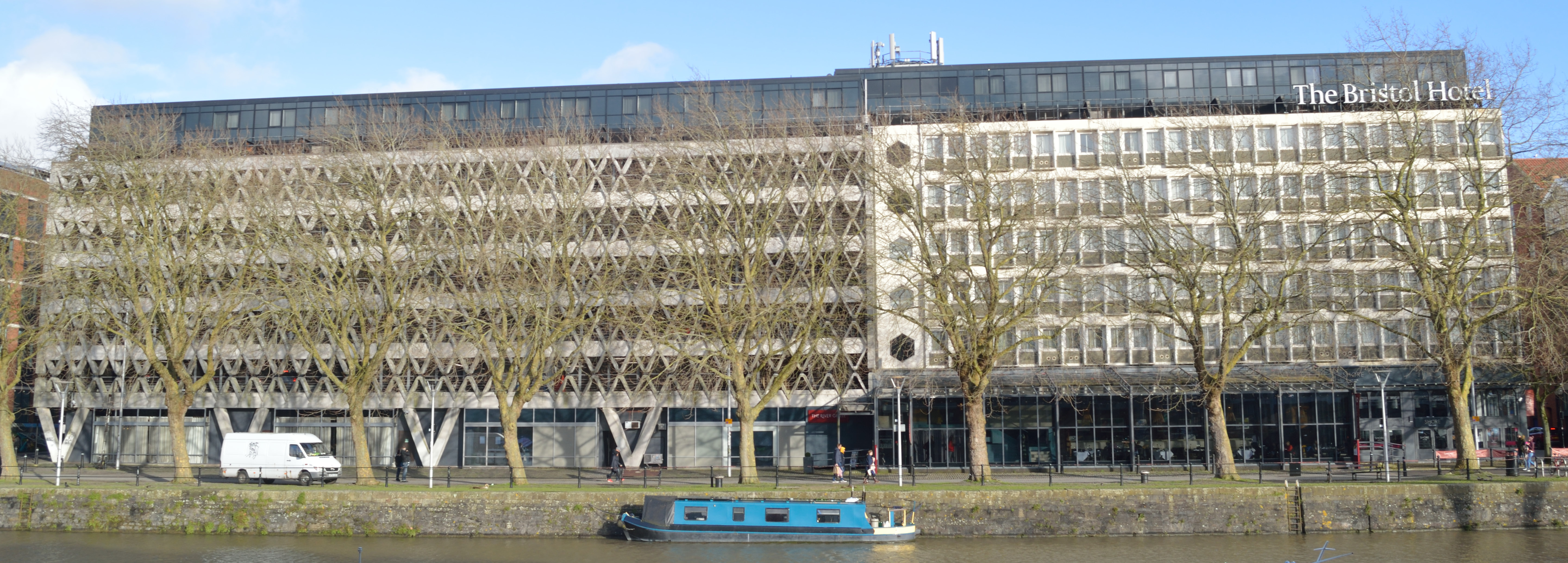
A modernist hotel and car park built dockside in 1966, while the docks were still in active use; now The Bristol Hotel.

Like much of British post-war development, the regeneration of Bristol city centre was characterised by Modernist architecture including Brutalist towers such as the "tall and intrusive" Castlemead, one of several examples of such "abysmally dull and big" brutalist architecture in the city. Similar insensitivity was demonstrated in the massive expansion of road infrastructure, under what Pevsner describes as the "megalomaniac Reconstruction Plan of 1946". The world's oldest shot tower in Redcliffe was lost to road development in 1968, being replaced the following year by the Cheese Lane Shot Tower on a different site. Since the 1990s this trend has been reversing, limiting access with the closure of a number of main roads, whilst the Broadmead shopping centre has been further developed. In 2006, one of the city centre's tallest Mid-Century Modern towers was lost, with further historic 20th century structures being destroyed more recently. The transfer of the docks to Avonmouth, 7 miles (11 km) downstream from the city centre, relieved congestion in the centre of Bristol and allowed substantial redevelopment of the old central dock area, the Floating Harbour. Andrew Foyle, in his Bristol volume in the Pevsner Architectural Guides city series published in 2004, notes that the redevelopment highlighted both "the potential and difficulties of harbourside regeneration".

Clifton Cathedral, to the north of the city centre, was built during the early 1970s. In the 1990s, a harbourside concert hall designed by architects Behnisch & Partners was planned, but an Arts Council decision cut the funding and the project has not been revived. This has left We The Curious (formerly At-Bristol), which mixes art, science and nature, with its all-reflective planetarium, as the centrepiece of the Harbourside development.

=== 21st century ===
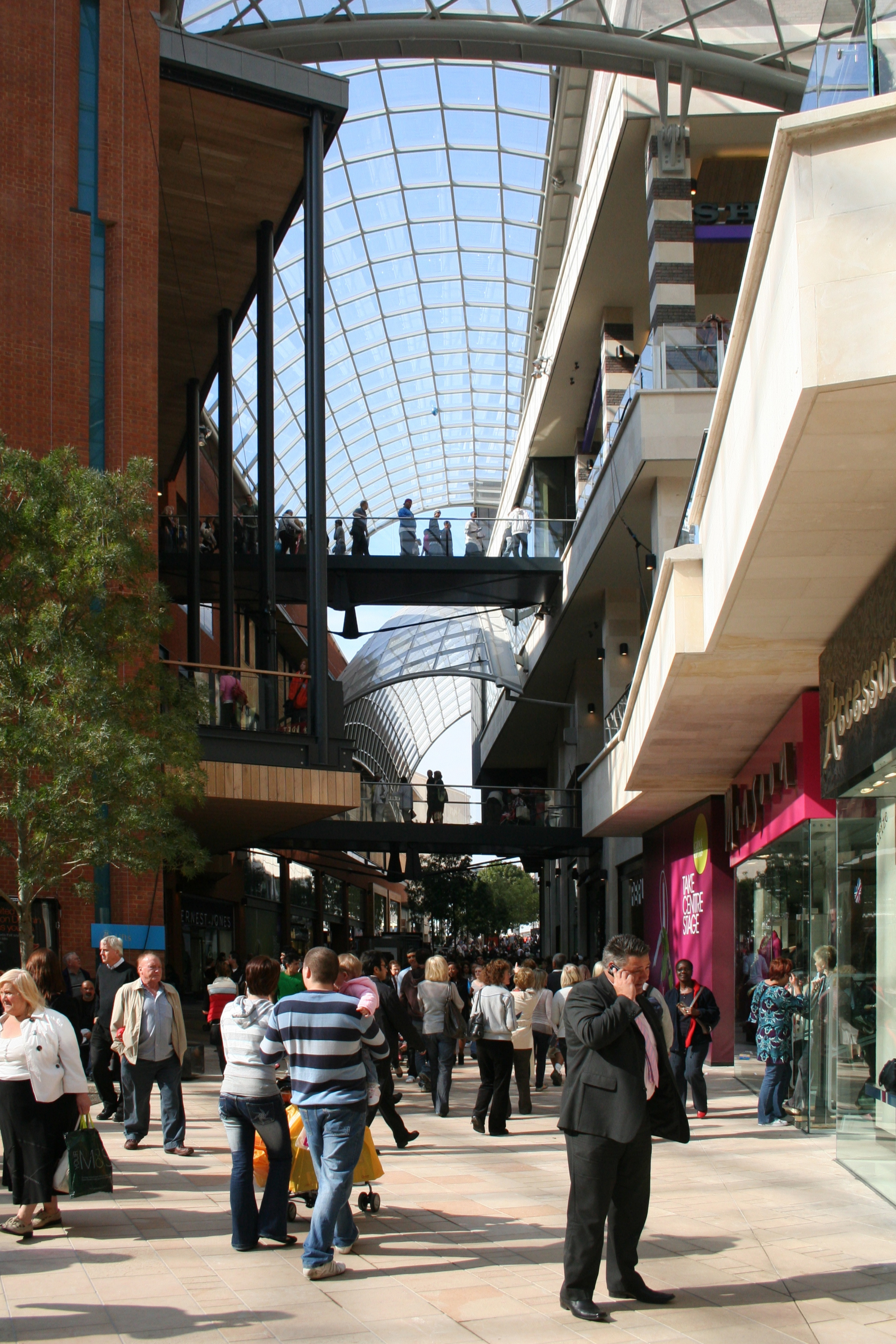
The Cabot Circus shopping centre, opened in 2008.

The Broadmead shopping centre was redeveloped in the early years of the century, involving the demolition of one of the city's tallest mid-century towers, Tollgate House, in the construction of Cabot Circus. The former Bristol and West Tower was reworked into a glass skyscraper with glass panels in place of its concrete outer cladding. In 2005, the city council undertook extensive consultations about the future of tall buildings in Bristol, and identified support for new tall buildings so long as they are well designed, sustainable, distinctive and 'fit' into the existing urban landscape.

In May 2007, proposals were announced to build approximately 753,000 square feet (70,000 m^{2}) net of homes, offices, and business premises in the St Pauls area. The development, if it had been approved, would have included a 600 feet (183 m), 40-storey tower next to the M32 motorway, acting as a new entrance to the city. The tower would have been a similar shape to the Swiss Re "Gherkin" tower in London.

Planning for the large Finzels Reach development across the Floating Harbour from Castle Park, including the old Georges Brewery buildings, was first granted in 2006 but progress was hampered by the recession and the developers went into receivership. By 2015 the development is part complete with the historic waterfront facade still awaiting regeneration.

Since 2013, Bristol has seen an increase in buildings being built or office blocks being converted for student accommodation. These include Froomsgate House, Greyfriars, St Lawrence House in Broad Street, the former Magistrates Court site and New Bridewell Tower. In 2024, plans were approved to demolish the now closed Haymarket Premier Inn hotel, alongside the former Debenhams department store by the Bearpit. The new buildings will be mixed use developments including student accommodation, flats and co-living developments, and will be the two tallest buildings in Bristol. Demolition of the Premier Inn building began in September that year.

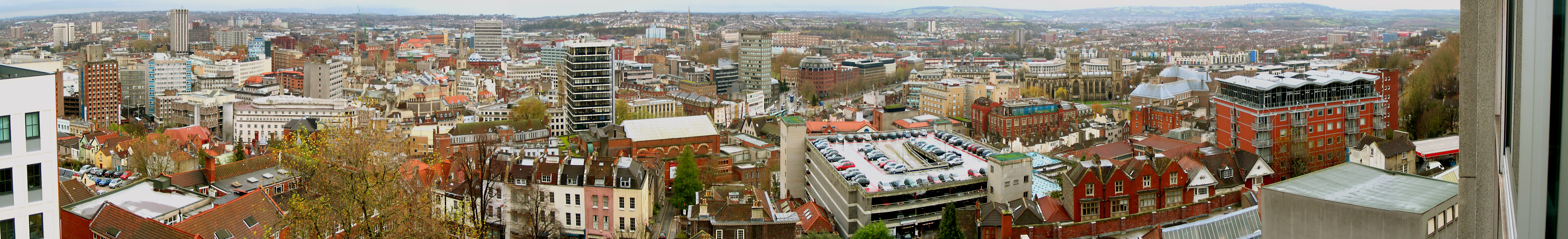
Panorama over Bristol

== Tallest buildings ==
A roster of the tallest buildings constructed in Bristol includes:

Rank	Building	Area	Height		Floors	Built	Ref.
Rank	Building	Area	m	ft	Floors	Built	Ref.
1	Castle Park View	Castle Park	98	322	26	2019-2022	
2	St Mary Redcliffe	Redcliffe	89	292		Completed 15th century	
3	Castlemead	Castle Park	80	262	19	1973-1981	
4	Wills Memorial Building	UoB, Clifton	66	217		1925	
5	Christ Church	Clifton	65	213		1885	
6	Eclipse	Castle Park	65	213	14	2008	
7	Beacon Tower	The Centre	63	207	18	1973	
8	Froomsgate House	Lewin's Mead	63	207	15	1971	
9	Clifton Heights	The Triangle	62		14		
10	Former Bristol and West Building	Marsh Street	61	200	17	1967	

== See also ==
- Churches in Bristol
- Grade I listed buildings in Bristol
- Grade II* listed buildings in Bristol
- Grade II listed buildings in Bristol
- History of Bristol
