= Marketgate, Bristol =

Residential building in Bristol, England

Marketgate
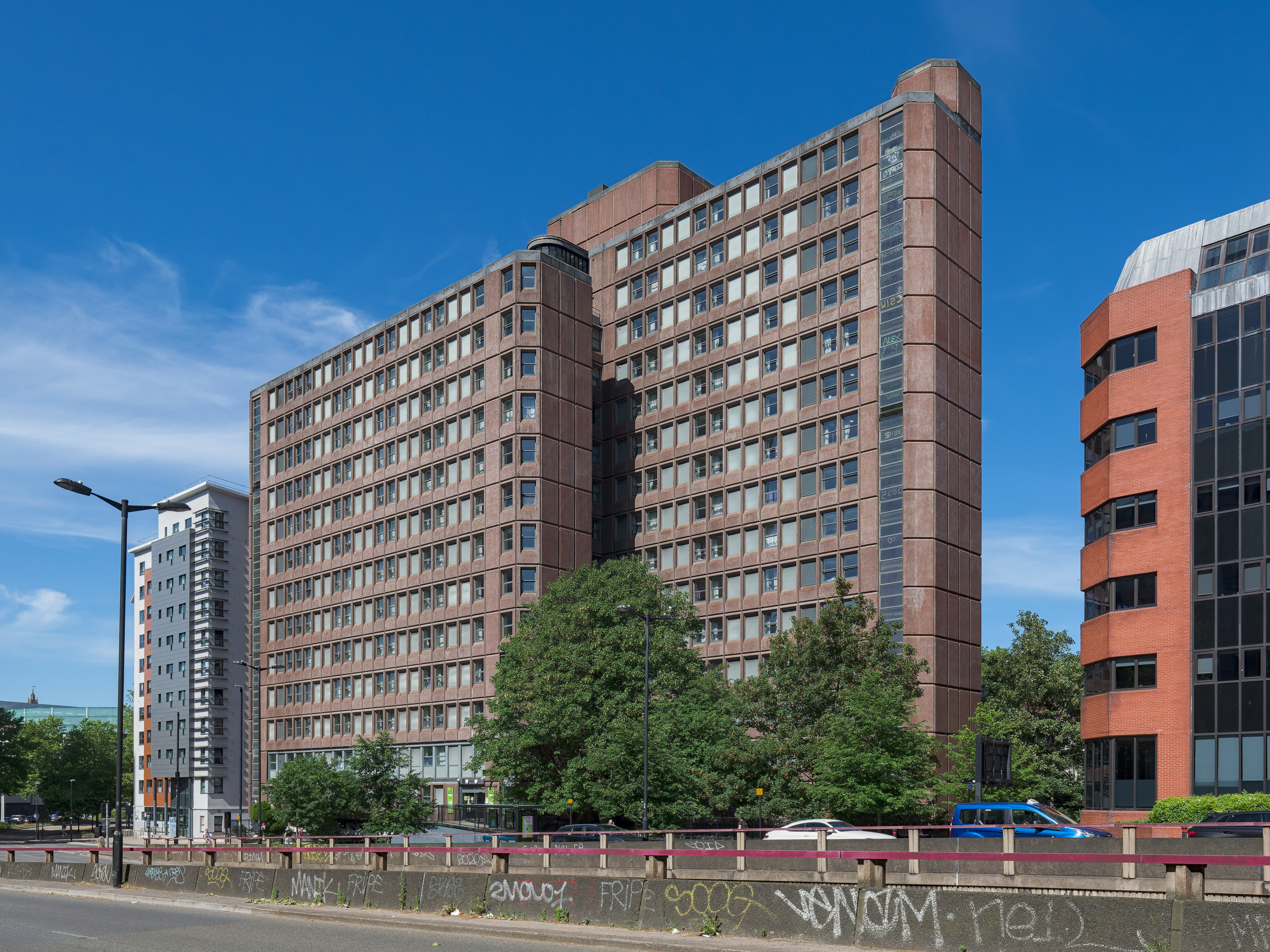
- Interactive map of the Marketgate area
- Former names: Mercury House

General information
- Status: Completed
- Type: Student accommodation
- Architectural style: Modernist
- Location: Marketgate, Bond Street South, Bristol, BS1 3PG
- Coordinates: 51.4568°N 2.5836°W
- Construction started: 1968
- Completed: 1970
- Opened: 9 November 1970
- Owner: Unite Students

Height
- Height: 53 m (175 ft)

Technical details
- Floor count: 16
- Floor area: 11,613 m² (125,000 sq ft)

Design and construction
- Architecture firm: Elsom, Pack & Roberts

Marketgate (originally Mercury House) is a 16-storey high-rise residential building in the Old Market area of Bristol, England. Constructed between 1968 and 1970 as an office building for the South-West regional headquarters of the Post Office, it later served as a major British Telecom administrative centre before being redeveloped in 2001–02 as accommodation for more than 500 University of the West of England students. The building stands on Bond Street South opposite Cabot Circus, and remains one of Bristol's tallest post-war structures. Having been conceived for use by the Post Office, its original name referred to the Roman god of messages and communication, Mercury.

== History ==
=== Post Office era (1968–1984) ===
Construction began in 1968 and the first staff transfers from the Post Office's scattered Clifton offices started in September 1970. Mercury House was formally opened on 9 November 1970 by the Lord Mayor in the presence of Post Office chairman William Hall, 2nd Viscount Hall, who used the occasion to publicise the new postal service.

The complex comprised two interlinked wings, one of 12 storeys for telecommunications staff and a 14-storey block for the postal division, served by four lifts. A fire in June 1973 damaged basement storage areas but left the superstructure and contents intact. Throughout the 1970s the building housed regional control rooms for mail operations and other logistics. A high-level pedestrian walkway on the Bond Street frontage built in 1970 but never connected, was finally linked to street level in 1984.

=== British Telecom era (1984–2000) ===
Following the separation of telecommunications from postal services, Mercury House became the South Territorial Office of BT in 1985, overseeing more than five million telephone lines across southern England and Wales. The Post Office regional tier was abolished in 1986, leaving BT as principal occupier. In August 1984, BT announced the redundancy of 150 staff in the building as part of an administrative overhaul. In August 1985 BT leased the top five floors of Castlemead to house several hundred staff from Mercury House, further freeing the latter for a renovation scheme. By the late 1990s BT sought more modern premises and, in 2000, confirmed its relocation to Temple Quay. Castlemore Securities sold the vacant 11,613 m² building on Bond Street to Berkeley College Homes for £18 million the same year.

=== Conversion to student accommodation (2000–present) ===
Berkeley secured planning permission to remodel the three-tower structure as accommodation for up to 400 students and key workers. In June 2001, Unite Group purchased the property for just over £4 million, increasing the capacity to 505 en-suite and studio rooms at an estimated development cost of £19 million. The refurbished complex, re-branded Marketgate, opened for the 2002–03 academic year and is now operated by Unite Students in partnership with the University of the West of England. It offers en-suite rooms and studios, together with shared kitchens, study areas and a common room.

== Architecture ==
Marketgate is a modernist high-rise of reinforced-concrete frame and pink aggregate curtain-wall cladding, typical of late-1960s public-sector office design. The tallest of its three sections rises to 53 metres (175 ft) over 16 occupied floors. Original design features included: a double-height services podium linking the towers; a glazed pedestrian deck at first-floor level (later connected by steps and ramp); four lifts serving all levels. The 2001–02 conversion reconfigured the internal layout while retaining the external profile, also adding retail space to part of the ground floor fronting Bond Street South. Historian Andrew Foyle criticised the building for having "horribly enveloped" its surrounding buildings in the Old Market area. In June 1984, at a hearing of the Avon County Council Land and Buildings Committee, Councillor Bill Graves also criticised the modern architecture of Mercury House, along with contemporaneous developments in its vicinity such as Spectrum and the Bristol United Press Building.

== See also ==
- List of tallest buildings and structures in Bristol
