= New Bridewell Tower =

New Bridewell
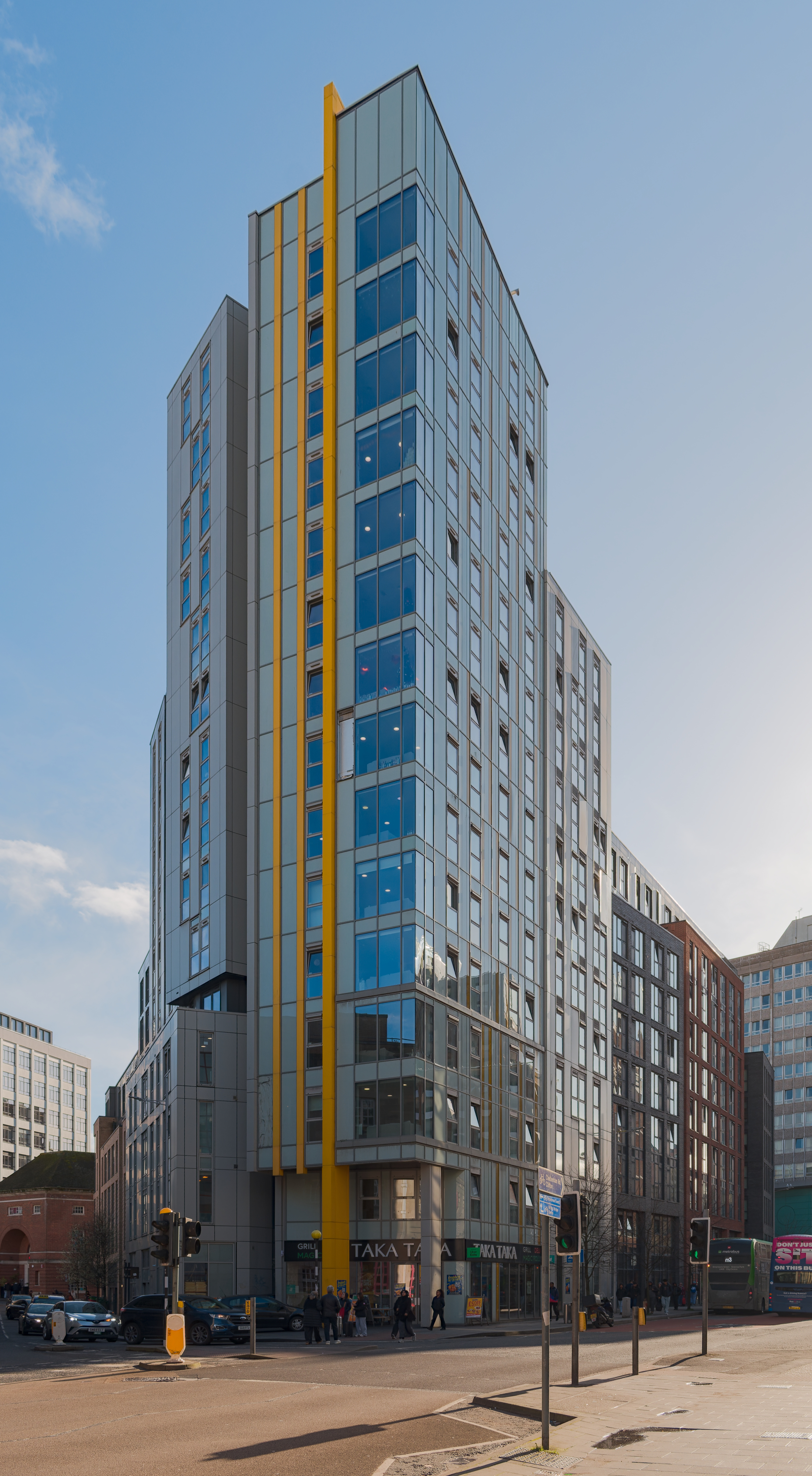
- Interactive map of the New Bridewell area

General information
- Status: Completed
- Type: High-rise building
- Location: Bridewell Street; Bristol; England
- Coordinates: 51.4569°N 2.5936°W
- Construction started: 2014
- Completed: August 2016

Height
- Roof: 49 m (160.76 ft) (AGL)

Technical details
- Floor count: 16

Design and construction
- Architect: AWW Architects
- Main contractor: Watkin Jones Group

New Bridewell Tower (or New Bridewell) is a 16-storey student accommodation building located in Central Bristol, England. The £30 million development consists of demolishing the former 1970's New Bridewell Police headquarters and the construction of a 499-bed student accommodation building. The development also includes a public square, which provides a link to the nearby old Magistrates court redevelopment, and 600 sq metres of commercial floor space and public realm improvements.

== History ==
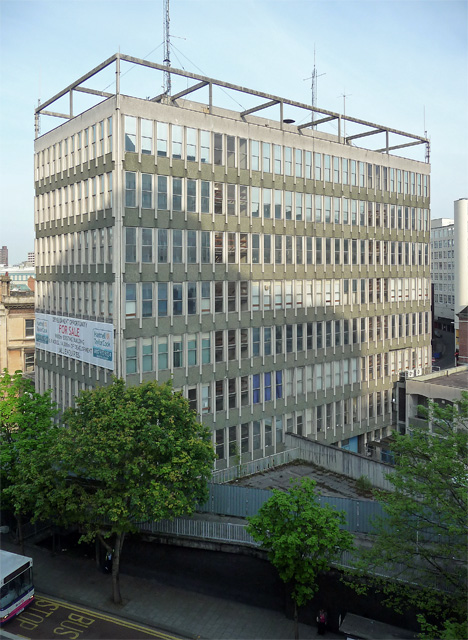
The former New Bridewell Police headquarters in the same location in May 2012

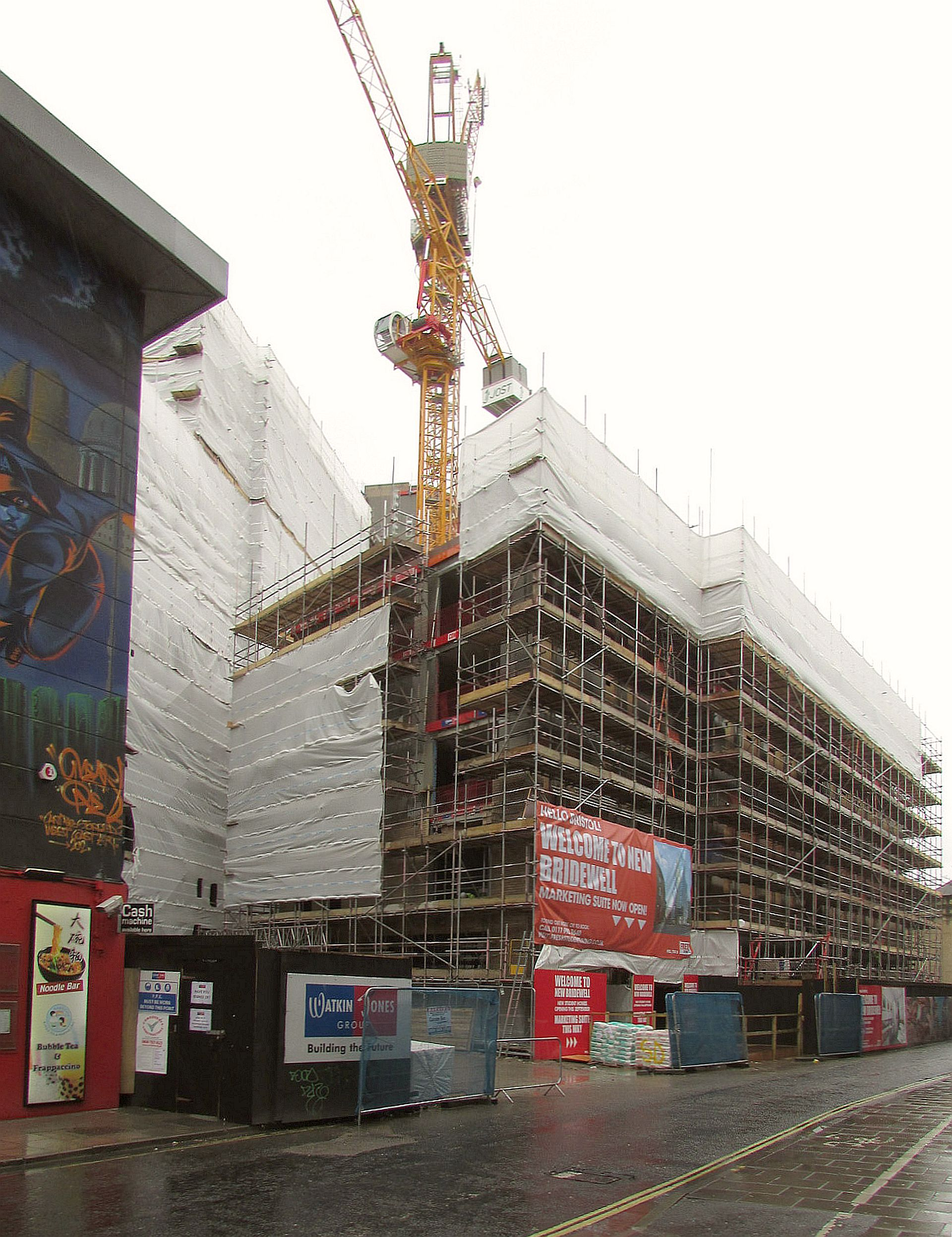
The tower under construction in February 2016

The site was previously occupied by the New Bridewell Police headquarters building which was constructed in the 1970s and there were once concrete footbridges, which span over Rupert Street and Nelson Street, that provided a pedestrian link to the Froomsgate House and office buildings located on Nelson Street. In early autumn 2014, the concrete footbridges over Rupert Street were demolished as part of the scheme. The development was completed in late August 2016.

== See also ==
- Buildings and architecture of Bristol
