= Castlemead =

Office building in Bristol, England

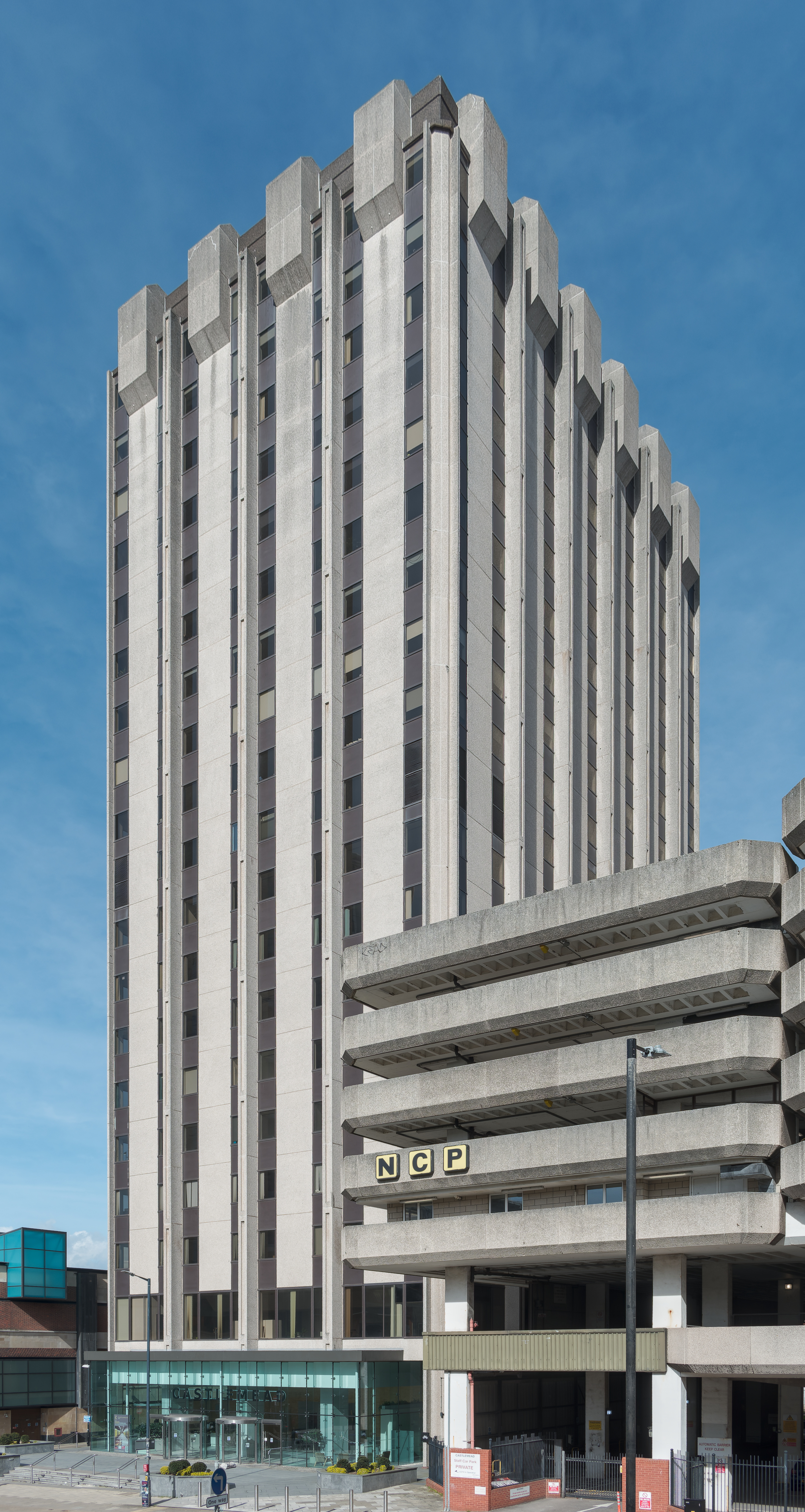
- Castlemead seen from Castle Park
- Interactive map of the Castlemead area

General information
- Status: Completed
- Type: Offices
- Architectural style: Brutalism
- Location: Bristol, England
- Coordinates: 51.4571°N 2.5852°W
- Construction started: 1973
- Completed: 1981
- Owner: Floreat Real Estate
- Operator: Knight Frank LLP

Height
- Roof: 80 m (260 ft)

Technical details
- Floor count: 18
- Floor area: 133,600 square feet (12,410 m^{2})

Design and construction
- Architect: A. J. Hines

Website
- https://castlemeadbristol.co.uk/

Castlemead is a high-rise commercial office building in Bristol, England, located on Lower Castle Street near Castle Park. At 80 metres (260 ft) tall, it was the tallest building in Bristol from its completion in 1981 until it was surpassed by Castle Park View in 2020. The building comprises 18 storeys, 17 of which are used as office space.

Castlemead houses a variety of commercial tenants including IMDb, Beaufort Securities, IBEX Global UK, Bluefin, Equiniti, Marsh Commercial, and the Bristol IT Company. The building is also used as an examination centre by Lloyds TSB and the City of Bristol College. Letting agents have included Knight Frank, JLL, and HTC.

== History ==
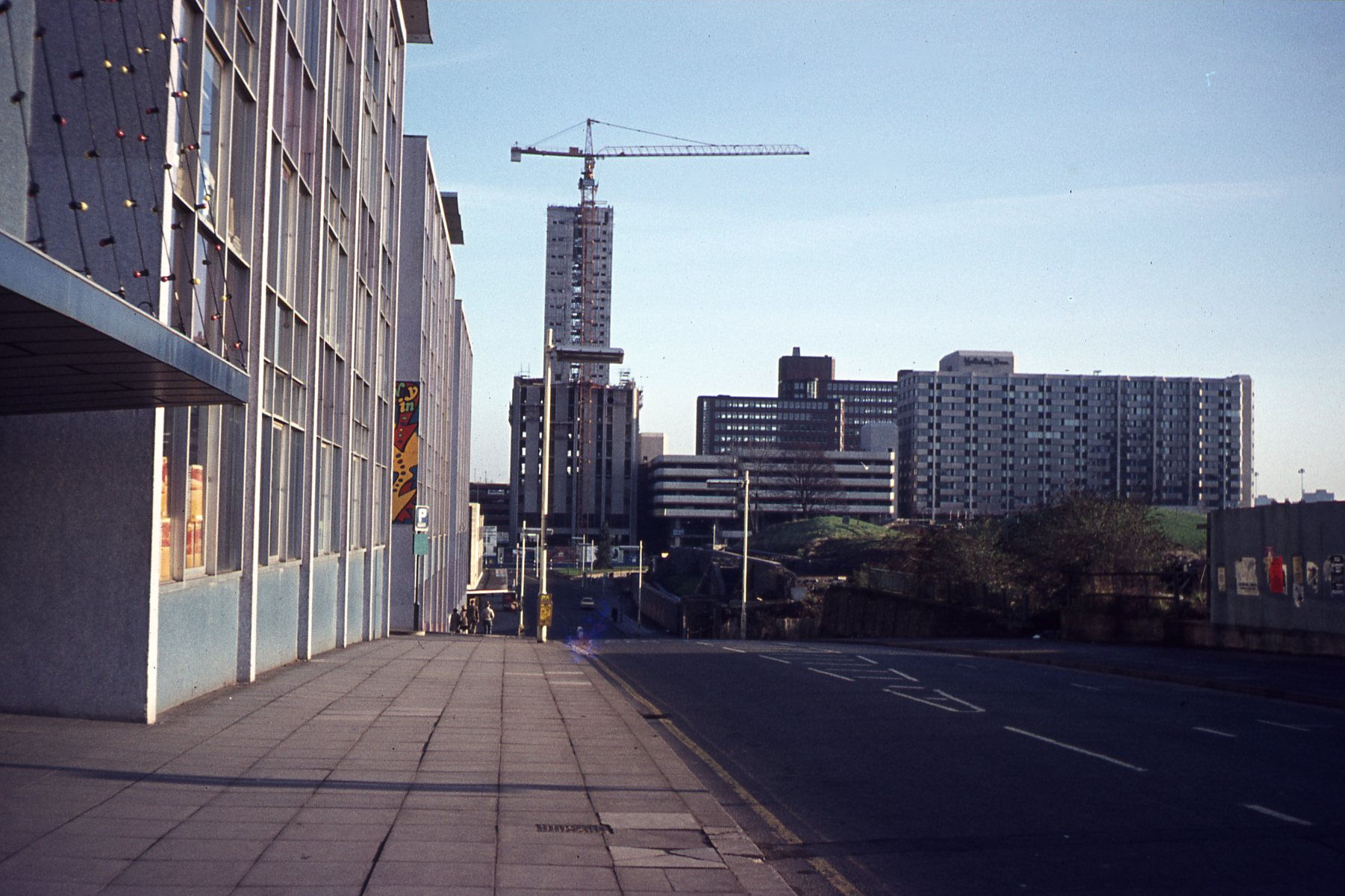
Castlemead during construction in 1974, as seen from Broad Weir.

Early plans for the Castle Green area following post-ward clearance included proposals for civic buildings by the City Architect John Nelson Meredith in 1944, but much of the cleared land around Castle Park was later used as surface car parking during the 1960s while longer-term redevelopment schemes progressed. Renewed plans for major redevelopment around the part of the Broadmead shopping centre projecting onto Lower Castle Street were already under way in the late 1960s, and the area was increasingly treated as a clearance site ahead of rebuilding. Bristol Corporation pursued a policy of taking back possession of shops as leases ended, contributing to a concentration of vacant street-level units while longer-term plans were developed for the site.

Castlemead was approved and built before the City's post-crash planning policies placed greater emphasis on conservation. Following the 1973–74 stock market crash, new development increasingly shifted toward derelict sites outside the historic core. Castlemead was among the last large office projects completed in the central area before these policies took effect. In the years immediately preceding construction, city-centre redevelopment schemes were closely tied to expectations of expanding office demand. Large occupiers increasingly sought office floorplates of at least 10,000 sq ft (930 m^{2}) per unit, while some developments faced difficulties letting non-retail showroom space that planning conditions required at lower levels.

Construction of Castlemead began in 1973 but was suspended due to a recession in the property market. The building was eventually completed in 1981 and was designed by architect A. J. Hines. Work on the site restarted in September 1977 after the main contractor, Cubitts, returned to re-erect a tower crane and complete the roof structure, with remaining work focused on internal services and glazing. The original developers, Town and Commercial Properties, had entered voluntary liquidation, and completion was taken forward by Norwich Union and the AP Bank, with completion at that stage projected for spring 1979.

In the decades following its completion, Castlemead changed ownership multiple times. Prior to 2016, it was owned by property management group F&C Reit, and was then acquired by London-based Oval Real Estate. In July 2018, Floreat Real Estate purchased Castlemead as part of an off-market deal valued at £44.7 million. Following the acquisition, Knight Frank was appointed to manage the building's rent collection, facilities, and placemaking strategy.

In 2020, plans were announced for a £2.1 million refurbishment, aiming to modernise the building and improve its environmental credentials. The refurbishment introduced a 24-hour reception area, secure access with a lift, and extensive facilities for cyclists and commuters. These included 374 bike parking spaces, 18 showers, personal lockers, a drying room, and 12 electric vehicle charging points. The project was completed in 2021 and achieved Grade A standard throughout. It also became the first building in Bristol to meet the Platinum level of the CyclingScore certification scheme.

In early 2024, owners Floreat appointed CBRE to market Castlemead for offers over £27.5 million. At the time of listing, the building was 94% let to 15 tenants including DPD, Regus, Reed, OpticalExpress and Marsh, generating an average rent of £27.23 per square foot. The building holds a long leasehold from Bristol City Council expiring in 2103, with an option to extend to 2168.

== Architecture ==
The building is characterised by its brutalist features, with unbroken concrete verticals and narrow glazing strips that rise up the façade and culminate in a flared top that is designed to emulate the merlons of a castle's battlements in a nod to local heritage. The building is arranged as largely regular open-plan office floors intended to be subdivided into smaller suites, with the refurbishment marketed as providing Grade A specification across the office levels. Six passenger lifts serve the upper floors, while the refurbishment introduced a remodelled reception and a separate secure entrance with dedicated lift access. Castlemead is located in a group of brutalist buildings, the adjacent Broadmead car park (1960) and Delta Hotels (formerly Marriott).

Castlemead is a prominent example of brutalist architecture in Bristol. However, the building has also attracted criticism for its location and visual impact on the urban landscape. Alongside other high-rises constructed in the post-war period, it has been considered emblematic of an era when tall buildings disrupted Bristol's historic skyline, and has been considered "intrusive".

== Location ==
Castlemead is centrally located in Bristol, adjacent to Cabot Circus and Broadmead on Lower Castle Street near its junction with the A4044 (Temple Way). It is within walking distance of the Floating Harbour and River Avon, along with their associated amenities. It is situated on the edge of Castle Park, a public green space that occupies the historic centre of the city, which was extensively damaged during the Bristol Blitz and was once the site of Bristol Castle.

== See also ==
- List of tallest buildings and structures in Bristol
