= Beacon Tower =

Office building in Bristol, England

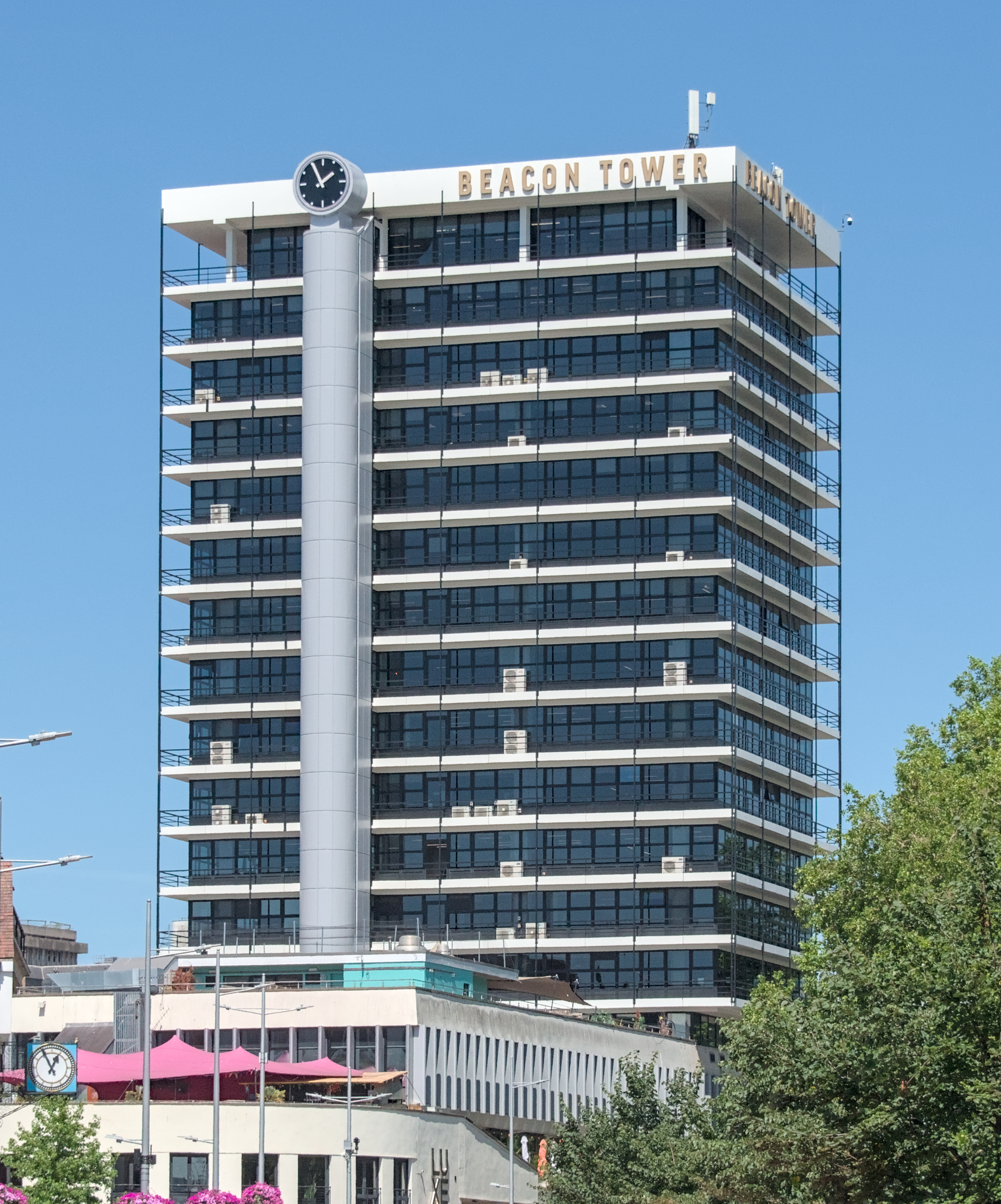
- Beacon Tower in 2025
- Interactive map of the Beacon Tower area

General information
- Status: Completed
- Type: Offices
- Architectural style: Modernist
- Location: Bristol, England
- Coordinates: 51.455°N 2.598°W
- Completed: 1973
- Client: Sir Robert McAlpine
- Owner: AEW

Height
- Roof: 63 m (207 ft)

Technical details
- Floor count: 15

Design and construction
- Architect: Michael Jenner
- Architecture firm: Moxley Jenner & Partners
- Main contractor: Sir Robert McAlpine
- Designations

Locally Listed Building
- Official name: Colston Tower and Conference Centre
- Designated: 1 September 2016
- Reference no.: 298

Beacon Tower is a high-rise office building in Bristol, England, located on Colston Street in the city centre. It was originally named the Colston Centre, and later Colston Tower, and was completed in 1973. The building stands 63 metres (207 ft) tall and contains 15 floors of commercial office space. It was renamed in 2020 following discussions about Bristol’s commemorative links to Edward Colston, a Bristol-born slave trader, philanthropist, and Member of Parliament, following the George Floyd protests in the United Kingdom.

== History ==
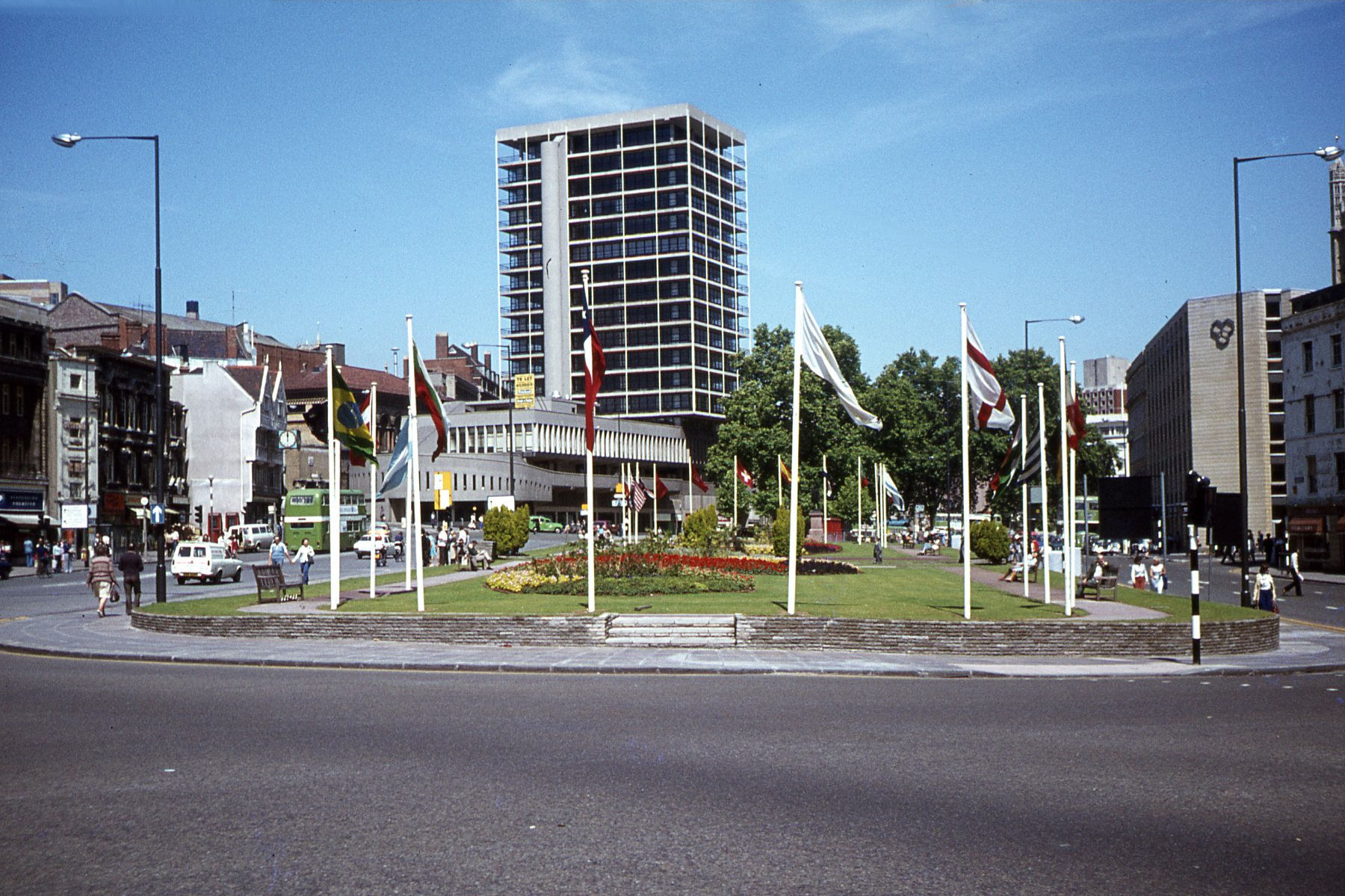
The original design of the building with white struts, prior to the addition of signage and clock.

The tower was designed in 1961 by Michael Jenner of the architectural firm Moxley Jenner & Partners and completed in 1973 on a site at the junction of Colston Street and Colston Avenue, from which the building took its original name. The podium of the tower was originally part of a larger plan involving elevated pedestrian walkways known as the 'city in the sky' scheme, which was largely abandoned by the 1970s and entirely demolished in the 21st century. The building was developed for Sir Robert McAlpine, which also served as contractor. A large public clock was installed on the south face of the building around 1996 on the cladding for a newly installed external lift.

In 2017, the building was acquired by investment firm AEW from Resolution Property for £17.5 million. At the time, it comprised approximately 89,000 square feet of office space and was home to several businesses in the healthcare, technology, and professional services sectors. Tenants include Newcross Healthcare, who are based on the 15th floor.

=== Controversy and renaming ===
In June 2020, amid the George Floyd protests in the United Kingdom, public scrutiny increased over the city's monuments and buildings named after Edward Colston, a 17th-century merchant associated with the transatlantic slave trade. On 7 June 2020, protestors removed and deposited the nearby statue of Edward Colston into Bristol Harbour. Four days later, AEW removed the lettering from the top of the building.

The building’s owners stated the removal was undertaken to address security concerns and that a new name would be chosen in consultation with tenants. AEW subsequently worked with branding agency Moose Studios to develop a shortlist of names. Tenants were subsequently invited to vote among four options: Beacon Tower, Unity Tower, Vantage Point, and Century Tower. The result was announced on 26 November 2020, with “Beacon Tower” receiving the majority of votes.

The renaming followed similar changes elsewhere in Bristol, including the renaming of Colston Hall into Bristol Beacon and of Colston’s Girls’ School to Montpelier High School. The new signage was installed on 19 January 2021, seven months after the original letters were removed.

== Architecture ==
Beacon Tower is constructed in a modernist style typical of the early 1960s. It features a white-clad vertical tower rising above a podium, with a curved façade that addresses the angular layout of the site at the junction of two streets. The structure of the façade includes glazed walls behind a skin of balconies and vertical struts. The entrance and façade design were also influenced by fire regulations, resulting in a prominent southern escape staircase and high-level windows that some critics viewed as compromising the building’s intended symmetry. The building was intended to integrate with the surrounding urban landscape while also accommodating modern office requirements of the time.

== See also ==
- List of tallest buildings and structures in Bristol
- Bristol Beacon
- Edward Colston
