= John Nelson Meredith =

British architect (1892–1971)

J. Nelson Meredith OBE FRIBA

City Architect of Bristol
- In office 1938 – October 1957
- Preceded by: Position established
- Succeeded by: Albert H. Clarke

City Architect of Norwich
- In office 1932–1938
- Preceded by: J. S. Bullough
- Succeeded by: Leonard Hannaford

Personal details
- Born: 7 October 1892 South Wales
- Died: 18 January 1971 (aged 78) Clifton, Bristol, England
- Children: 2
- Occupation: Architect

John Nelson Meredith OBE FRIBA (7 October 1892 – 18 January 1971) was a British architect and city official. He served as the first city architect of Bristol from 1938 to 1957, a period that encompassed the destruction of the city during the Bristol Blitz, and its subsequent reconstruction. Meredith was responsible for the architectural design and planning of much of the post-war city, including the creation of the modern Broadmead shopping district, the reconstruction of the Colston Hall, and the development of large municipal housing estates and schools. Before his tenure in Bristol, he served as the city architect of Norwich.

== Early life and career ==
Meredith was a native of South Wales. He began his career in private practice in Liverpool before joining the Liverpool Corporation. In 1932, he was appointed as the city architect of Norwich, a position he held for six years. During his time in Norwich, he oversaw the design and construction of municipal infrastructure, including the Lakenham and Earlham housing estates and several schools.

Notably, he designed the branch library on Plumstead Road (1938), which was styled with a distinct 1930s brick facade. Although the Norwich City Hall was built during his tenure, he worked alongside the primary architects, Charles Holloway James and Stephen Rowland Pierce, and was involved in the department's expansion before his departure. He left Norwich in 1938 to take up the newly created position of city architect in Bristol. Upon his departure for Bristol, he was succeeded as city architect of Norwich by Leonard Hannaford.

=== City architect of Bristol ===
In 1938, Bristol City Council determined that the architectural work previously distributed among various departments required central coordination. Consequently, a dedicated architectural department was formed, and Meredith was appointed as the first city architect on a full-time basis in May of that year. Contemporary discussion around the appointment included how the new post would be overseen, and councillors subsequently supported the creation of a special committee to deal with the city architect's department. The creation of the city architect role attracted significant interest, with the council receiving 99 applications for the post; Meredith was selected from a short list of six candidates.

==== Wartime planning ====
Meredith's early years in Bristol were dominated by the Second World War. Following the heavy bombing raids of 1940 and 1941, which destroyed the historic heart of the city including the Castle Street and Wine Street shopping areas, he became a central figure in the planning for reconstruction. As early as 1941, he publicly advocated a rebuilding programme that rejected imitation historic styles in favour of simple, dignified architecture using local materials. Scholar of urban planning John V. Punter placed him among a generation of municipal architects who were sceptical of late Victorian revivalism and stylistic pastiche, instead promoting functional civic design and improved hygienic standards in building.

During the war, Meredith experimented with alternative construction methods to address material shortages, presenting plans for timberless houses to the Housing Committee as early as 1940. At the same time, wartime planning in Bristol combined modernisation with an early conservation impulse. Schedules of streets and squares considered architecturally important were compiled, anticipating later national listing practices while Meredith worked with the city engineer’s department on the Bristol Central Area Replanning Scheme, unveiled in 1944.

==== Post-war redevelopment ====
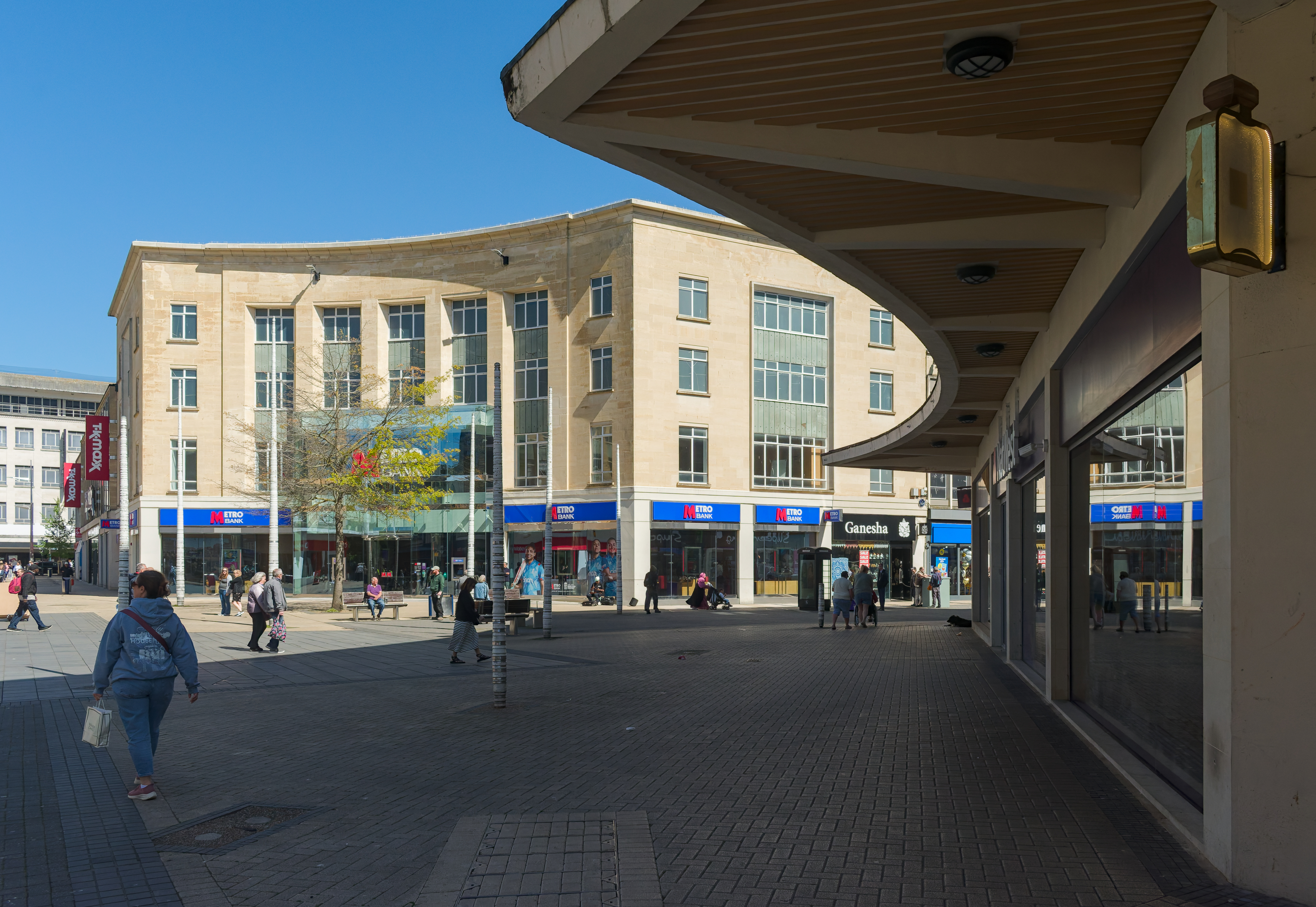
The new centre of Broadmead

Following the war, Meredith was tasked with the practical execution of rebuilding the city. Much of the designs of these new schemes were created alongside the City Engineer H. Marston Webb. His department was responsible for the design and supervision of the Broadmead shopping centre, which replaced the destroyed Castle Street district as Bristol's primary retail hub. Meredith's original concept for Broadmead was influenced by a desire for order and open space, envisioning blocks of buildings arranged around squares with a "modernist Georgian" aesthetic using Bath stone.

He championed the preservation of specific historic structures within the new development, such as John Wesley's New Room and the Quakers Friars, intending them to be set within tranquil piazzas. He also successfully campaigned for the restoration of the Lower Arcade. However, his comprehensive vision for a fully pedestrianised precinct with continuous canopies was frequently compromised by budget cuts and the demands of individual retailers who insisted on distinct store frontages. Despite these challenges, Broadmead became the centerpiece of Bristol's post-war recovery, with Meredith overseeing its layout and the construction of its initial phases.

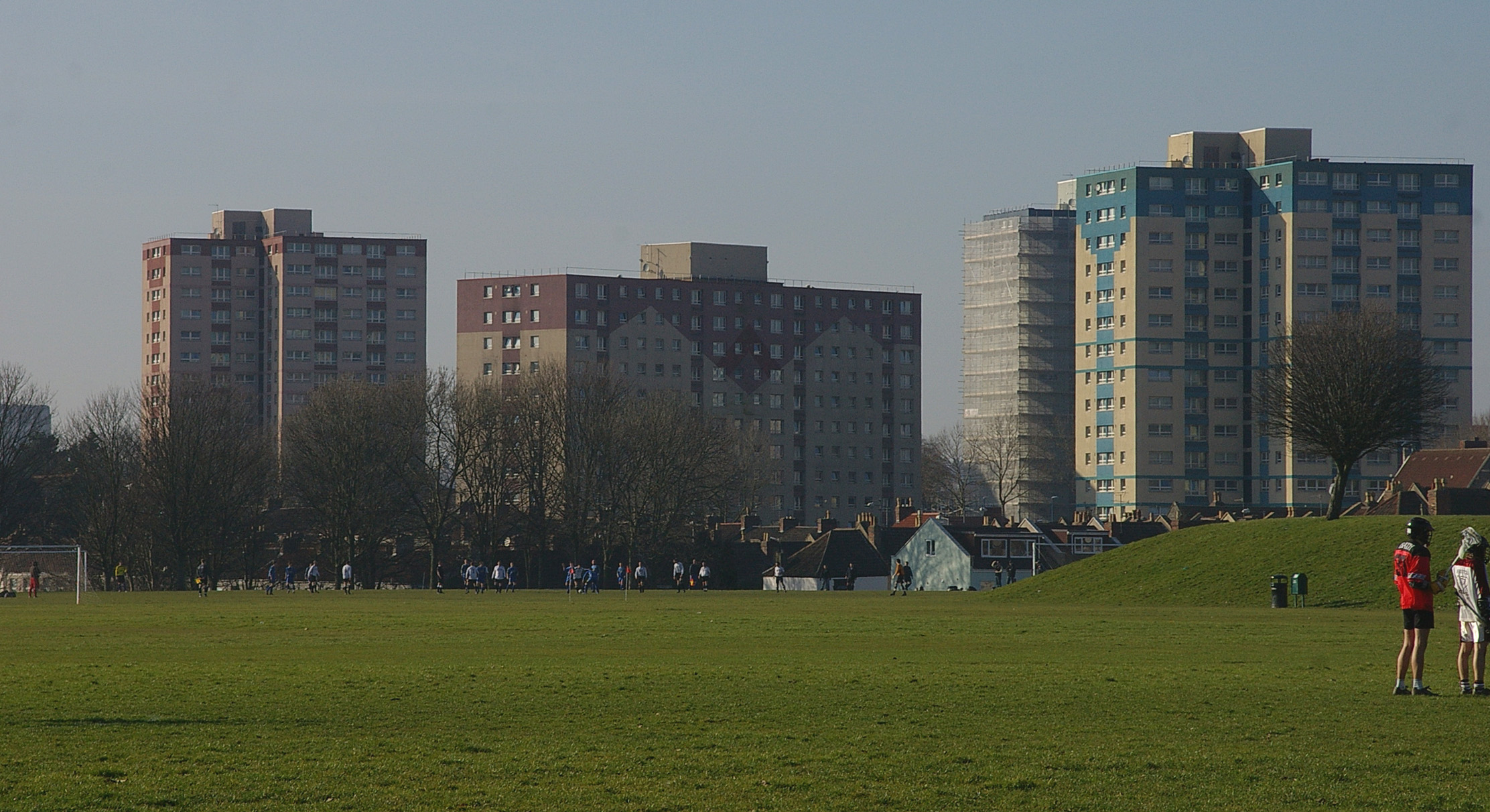
The high-rises on the Barton Hill Estate, constructed in the 1950s

A significant portion of Meredith's work involved addressing the acute housing shortage caused by the war. Under his direction, the city completed approximately 30,000 dwellings between 1945 and 1957. While early developments focused on low-density estates in outer areas like Henbury and Lockleaze, the scarcity of land eventually necessitated a shift toward high-rise living. Meredith oversaw the redevelopment of Barton Hill, a project that included the construction of Barton House. At 15 storeys, it was the tallest block of local authority dwellings in England outside of London at the time of its completion. His department's output included the design of high-density accommodation such as John Cozens House and Tyndall House in the St Jude's Estate, constructed in the late 1950s. The buildings in the Redcliffe Estate were also designed under Meredith’s department around this time, employing reinforced concrete construction with in-situ columns and partially precast beams. The earliest phases combined mid-rise slab blocks with towers of up to thirteen storeys. He was also responsible for a massive school building program, resulting in over 60 new schools, including Ashton Park School and Henbury Court Primary School. Meredith was also credited with preserving the character of Park Street during its post-war reconstruction, ensuring that the new buildings maintained the street's pre-war design despite the extensive bomb damage.

In 1951, Meredith completed the reconstruction of the interior of the Colston Hall after it had been gutted by fire in 1945. His design was praised for its acoustic qualities and contemporary style, utilising materials such as African hardwood and fibrous plaster to create a space that typified the Festival of Britain era architecture. The plan was devised in partnership with the acoustician Hope Bagenal.

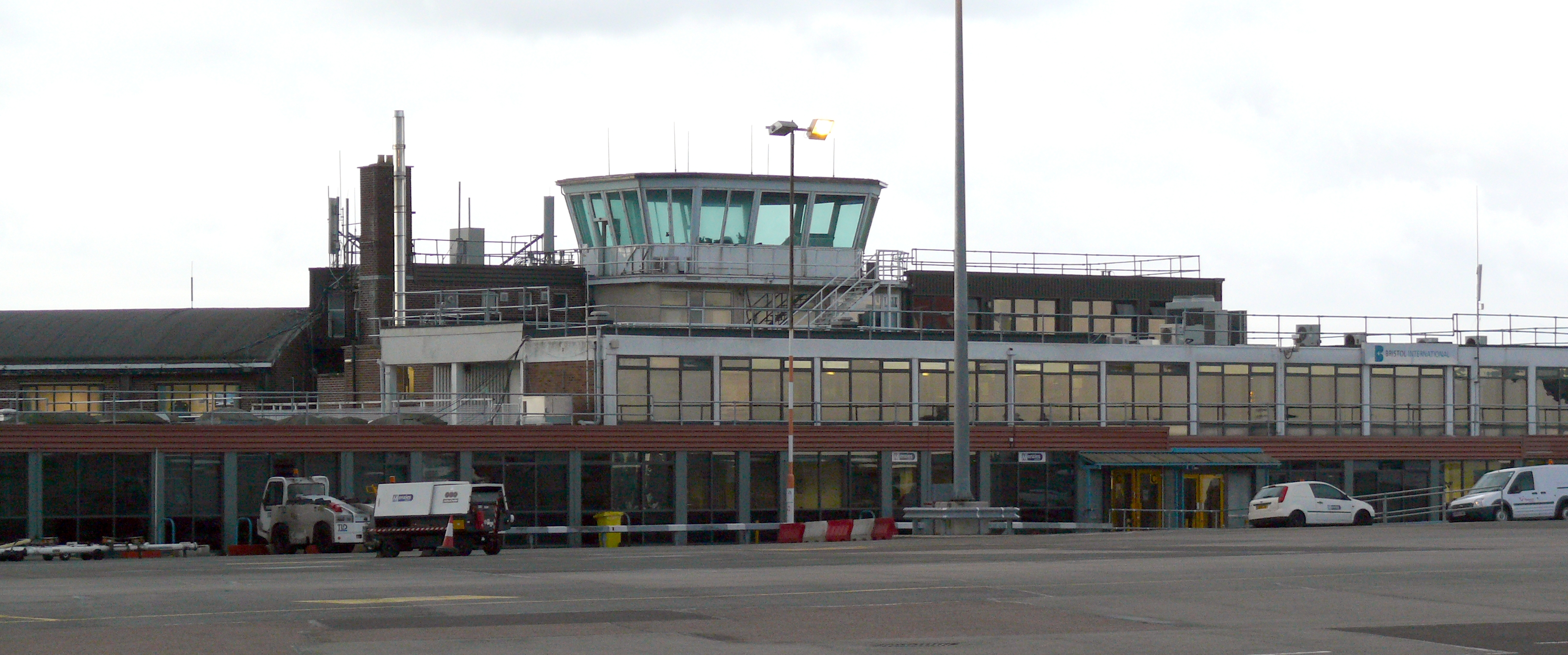
The terminal building of Bristol Airport, built 1957 and demolished 2020

His department also designed the original terminal building at Bristol Airport, which opened in 1957. The design prioritised functionalism and included a concourse with a convex curved roof and contemporary interior color schemes. Other notable public buildings designed under his leadership included the River Police Station at The Grove (1954) and various clinics, fire stations, and libraries.

== Public service ==
Meredith contributed to national building policy during World War II as a professional member of a Ministry of Works consultative standards body concerned with standardisation in building components and fittings. By 1940, Meredith was serving in a national professional capacity within the Royal Institute of British Architects' governance, being listed among those connected with the Institute's Council in contemporary reporting.

Meredith was known for his interest in "good manners in architecture" and the integration of buildings with their environment. He was an advocate for smoke abatement, arguing in 1948 for the use of smokeless fuels and district heating to protect public health and building fabrics. He also influenced the visual landscape of the city through color. Notably, he campaigned for the Clifton Suspension Bridge to be painted silver-grey, arguing it was a "bright, clean, cheerful yet restful colour", a change that was implemented in the late 1950s.

He retired in October 1957 and was succeeded by his deputy, Albert H. Clarke. Upon his retirement, he was credited with establishing a departmental atmosphere likened to a "family firm", characterised by long-serving staff and personal cooperation.

== Personal life ==
Meredith was married and had two children. His son, Bernard Nelson Meredith, also became an architect and won the Grand Prize at the Royal Academy Architectural School in 1954. His daughter, Hope Meredith, was an actress and broadcaster. In his private life, Meredith was an amateur painter and sketch artist.

He was appointed an Officer of the Order of the British Empire in the 1958 New Year Honours for his services to architecture and municipal housing. J. Nelson Meredith died on 18 January 1971 at the age of 78, at 2, Penavon, The Promenade in Clifton.

== See also ==
- Buildings and architecture of Bristol
