= Barton House, Bristol =

Residential building in Bristol, England

Barton House
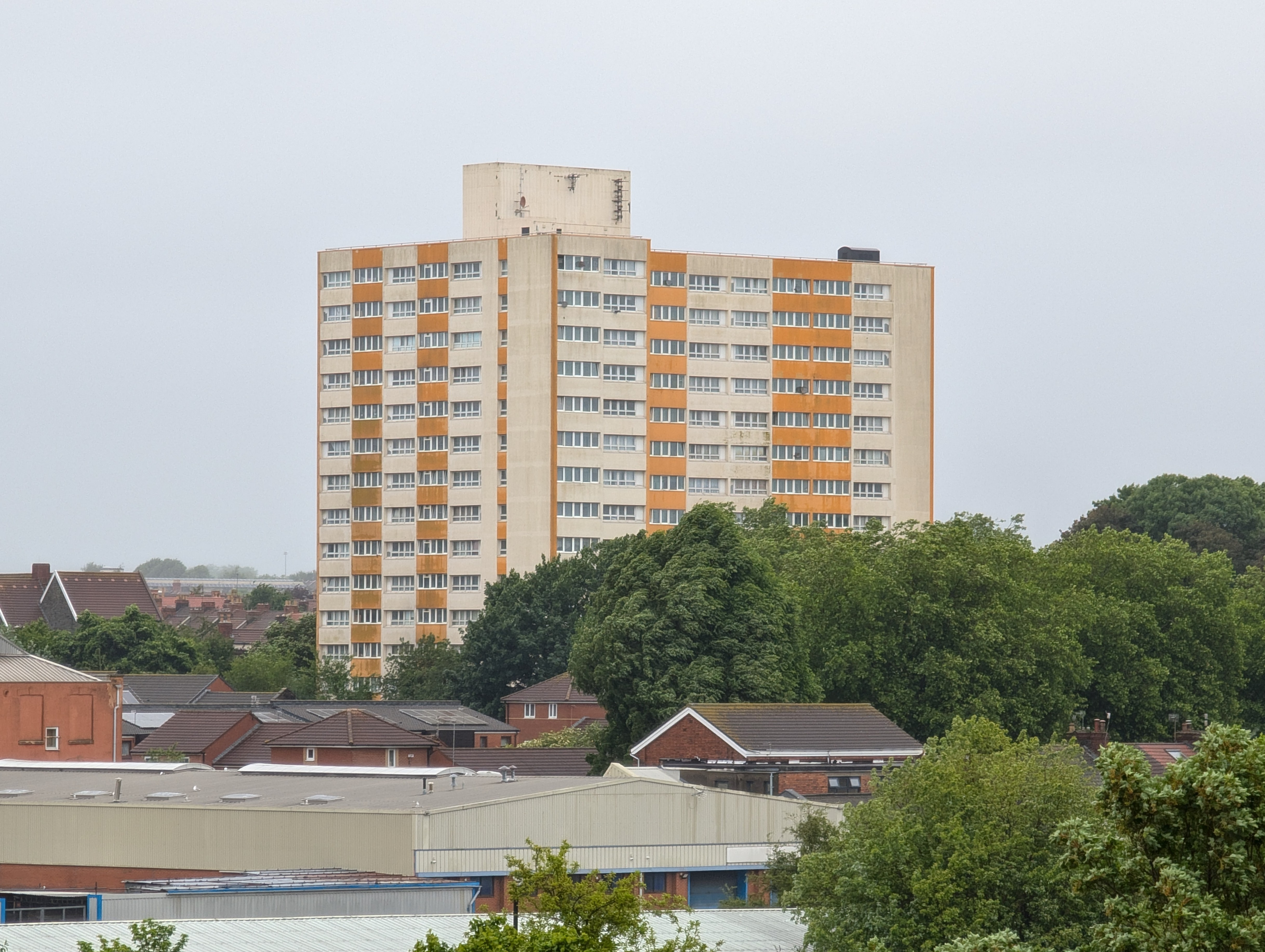
- Barton House from the southwest.
- Interactive map of the Barton House area

General information
- Status: Completed
- Type: Residential tower block
- Architectural style: Modern
- Location: Barton Hill, Bristol, England, Barton House, Bristol, BS5, England
- Coordinates: 51.4539°N 2.5608°W
- Completed: 1958
- Owner: Bristol City Council

Design and construction
- Architects: Albert H. Clarke, J. Nelson Meredith
- Structural engineer: Clarke, Nicholls & Marcel
- Quantity surveyor: J. A. Johnson
- Main contractor: Holland, Hannen & Cubitts

Barton House is a residential tower block in the Barton Hill area of Bristol, England. It is the city's oldest tower block and was officially opened on 23 July 1958.

== History ==
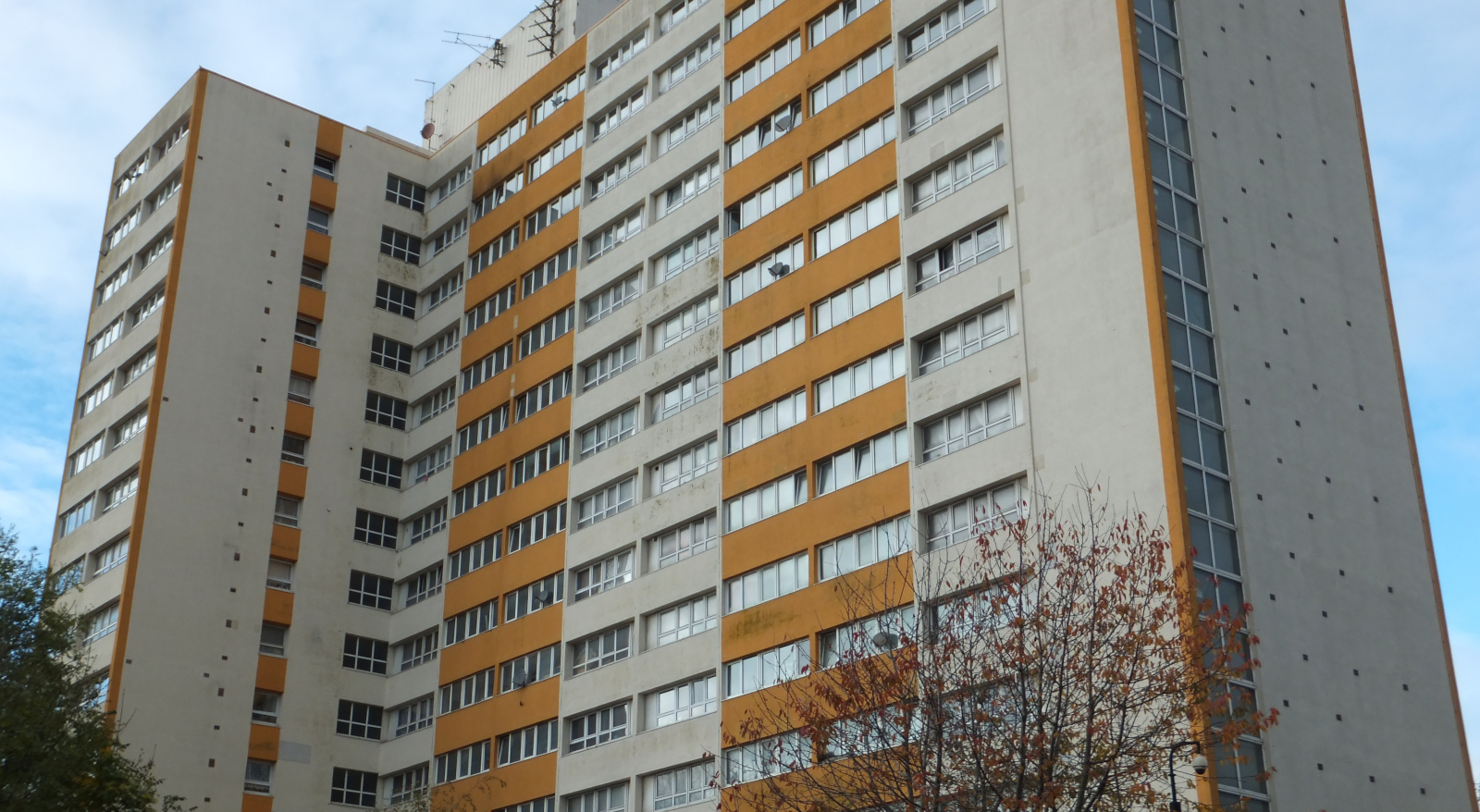
A picture of Barton House, Barton Hill facing South.

Barton House was constructed by 1958 at a cost of £315,744 (now more than £6.1 million). Strengthening works and concrete repairs were carried out around 1970, but there were no records of any structural surveys between then and at least 2018.

On 14 November 2023, Bristol City Council declared a risk of building collapse, ordering all residents to evacuate. This was due to "major structural faults" being discovered. Surveys at three of the 98 flats found there was a "risk to the structure of the block" in the event of a fire, explosion or large impact. The structural issues are reportedly not due to reinforced autoclaved aerated concrete (RAAC). Around 400 people were told to find alternative accommodation. The city council offered compensation to residents and temporary housing in a nearby Holiday Inn hotel, and payment of taxi fees resulting from the evacuation. On 28 November, it was revealed that the city council expected residents to continue payment of rent, allegedly for contractual reasons.

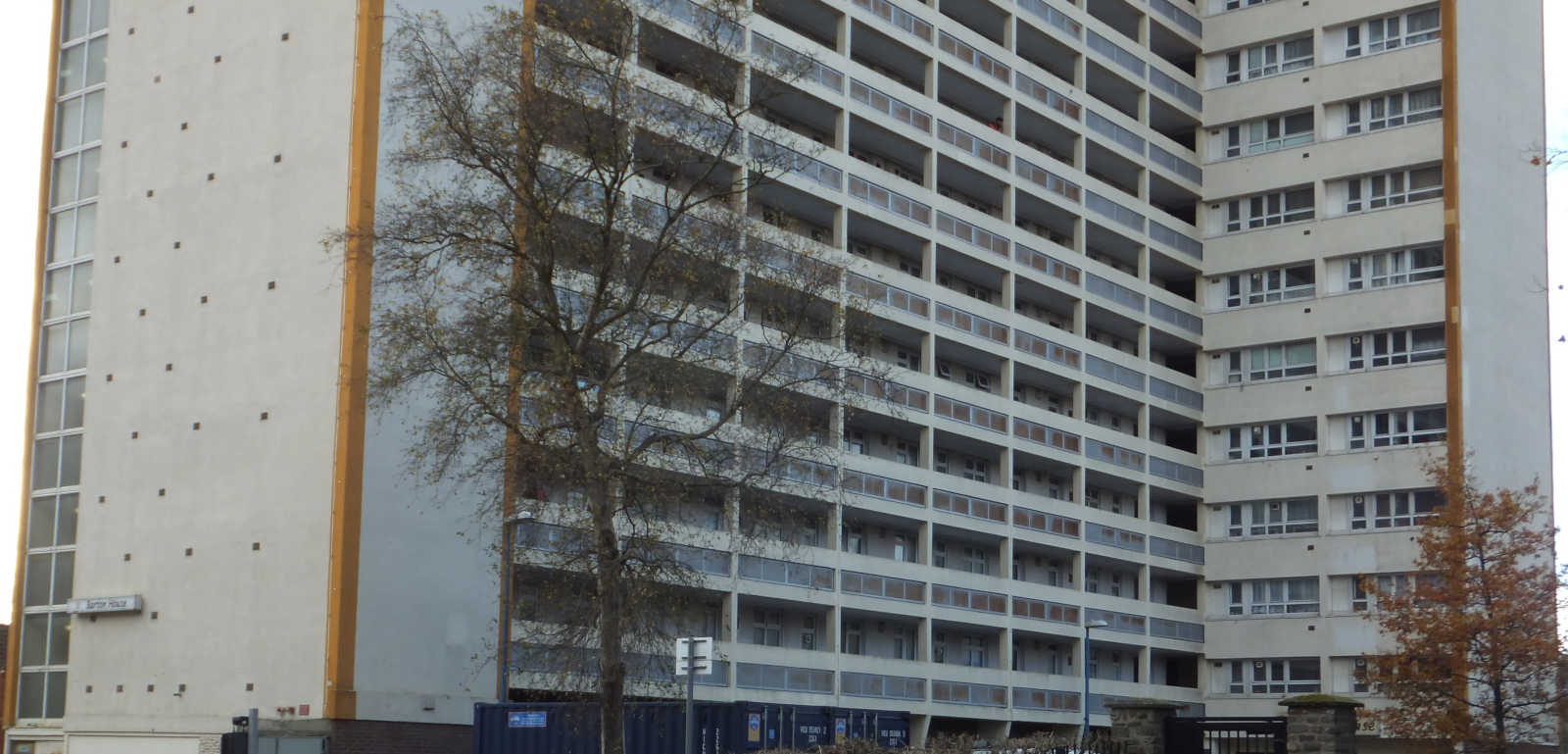
A picture of Barton House, Barton Hill facing North.

On 10 January 2024, the city council announced that residents should be able to return to their homes in February, after work to secure the safety of the building started on 8 January.

== See also ==
- Ronan Point, a block of flats that collapsed in 1968 which was built with large panel system-building, a similar design to Barton House.
- Twinnell House, another block of flats owned by Bristol City Council which prompted similar scrutiny following a fire in 2022 which was found to have been exacerbated by the building's construction.
- Surfside condominium collapse
- Tower blocks in Great Britain, description of British tower blocks and external links to relevant material.
