= Fusion Tower =

Residential building in Bristol, England

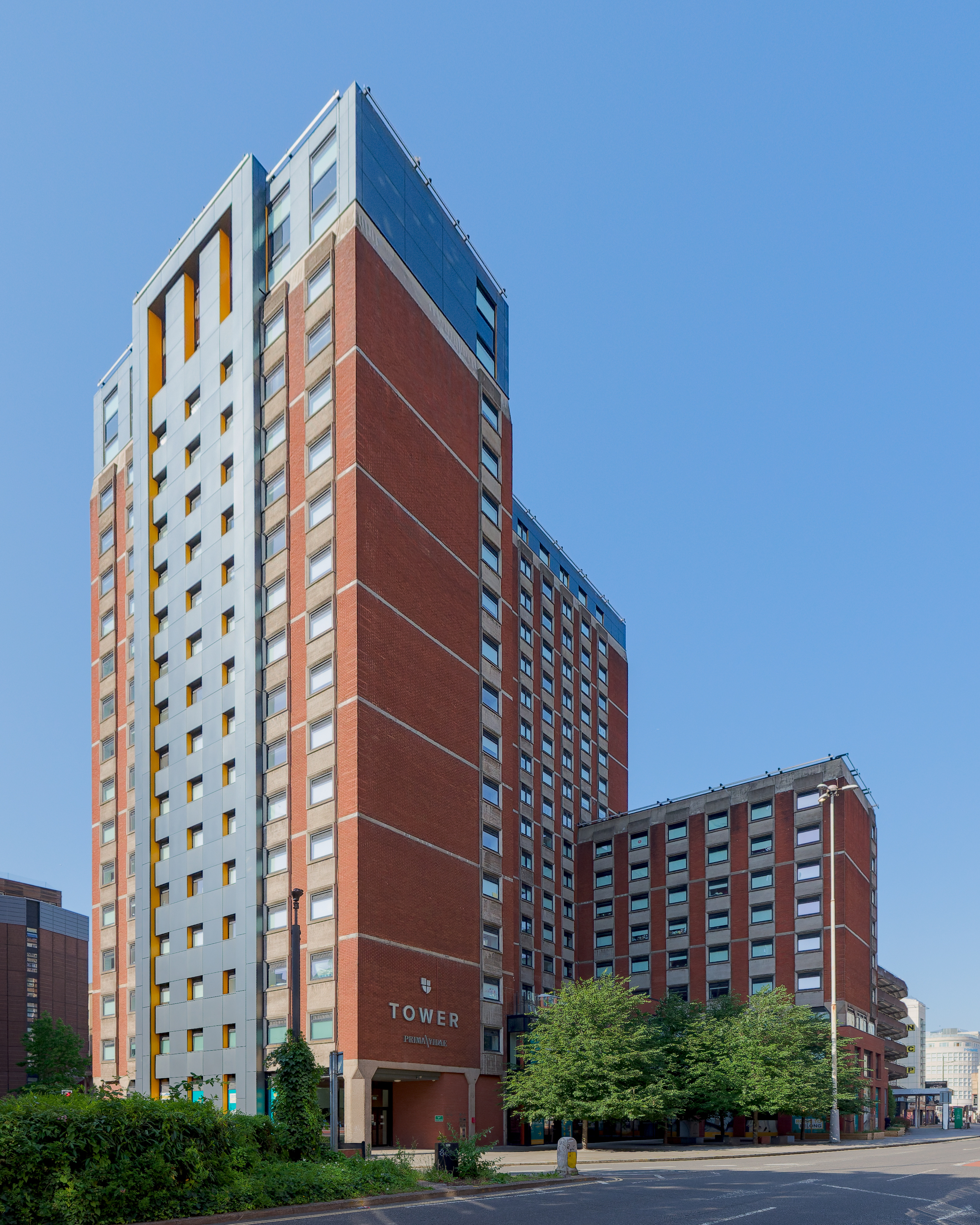
- Fusion Tower viewed from Rupert Street

- Location within Bristol
- Former names: Froomsgate House

General information
- Status: Completed
- Location: Rupert Street, Bristol, UK
- Coordinates: 51.457°N 2.595°W
- Completed: 1971
- Renovated: 2014
- Owner: Froomsgate House Realty Ltd
- Landlord: Hartnell Taylor Cook LLP

Height
- Height: 63 m (207 ft)

Technical details
- Floor count: 17
- Floor area: 1,368 m^{2} (14,730 sq ft)
- Lifts/elevators: 3

Design and construction
- Main contractor: Laing Development

Fusion Tower, formerly known as Froomsgate House, is a 63 m (207 ft) high student accommodation building in central Bristol, England, situated at the junction of Rupert Street with Lewin's Mead.

== History ==
Froomsgate House was completed in 1971 as a 15-storey office building. The building had 1,368 m^{2} (14,730 sq ft) of office space and was serviced by three lifts. There were also three floors of car-parking. The building was owned by Froomsgate House Realty Ltd and managed by Hartnell Taylor Cook LLP. The name derives from an ancient city gate by the River Frome which once stood on the site. Notable tenants include the Crown Prosecution Service Southwest.

On the first floor of the building is a mosaic mural map, the Froomsgate Map, executed by artist Phillipa Threlfall. This artwork was commissioned by the developer Laing Development owned by John Laing plc. The map depicts the surrounding area in 1673 as originally shown in James Millerd's map of that date. It is sited on the first floor as it was originally envisaged that Froomsgate House would be linked to other surrounding buildings by elevated walkways.

In 2014, Fusion Students, a property developer, converted and redeveloped the building into 480 bed student accommodation. It involved adding two new floors on top of existing roof level of the building. The accommodation building includes three to six-bedroom apartments, studio flats, a gym, a concierge service, a cinema, games area and off-street parking.

== See also ==
- List of tallest buildings and structures in Bristol
