= Head Entertainment =

Former retail chain in the United Kingdom

Head Entertainment LLP
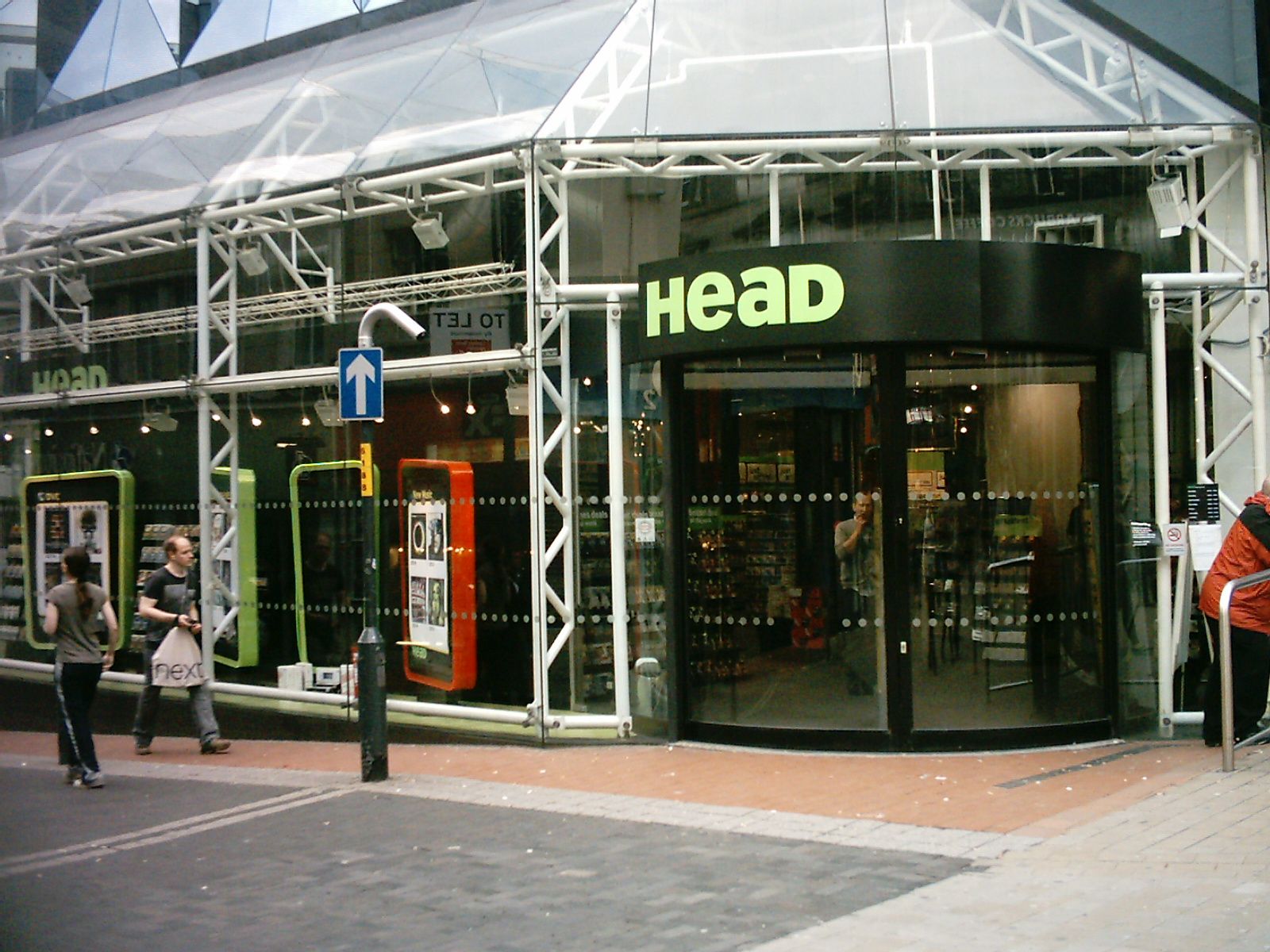
- A former Head Entertainment store in Leeds
- Company type: Private
- Industry: Entertainment Retail
- Founded: 2 February 2009
- Founder: Simon Douglas; Les Whitfield; Mark Noonan
- Defunct: March 2010

Head Entertainment LLP was a British entertainment retail chain founded in February 2009. It was established after the entertainment retailer Zavvi went into administration in December 2008, with some of its founders being former Zavvi directors who aimed to save a number of Zavvi stores and jobs.

In March 2010, Head Entertainment closed its final store and ceased operations.

== History ==
Head Entertainment was formed on 2 February 2009 by Simon Douglas, former managing director of Zavvi, Mark Noonan, former director of trading of Zavvi, and their business partner Les Whitfield.

On 18 February 2009, the day in which the final set of Zavvi store closures was announced, administrators Ernst & Young sold five Zavvi stores and their remaining stock to Head Entertainment. An additional two stores were purchased by Head Entertainment on 20 February 2009.

=== Closure ===
In December 2009, Head Entertainment started a closing down sale in all stores. In March 2010, it closed its final store at The Galleries in Bristol. The Bristol store would reopen as a Head Records store; despite the similarity of the name, Head Records is a separate entity.

== Locations ==
- Bluewater (Kent)
- Cardiff
- Dundee
- The Galleries (Bristol)
- Leeds
- Liverpool One
- Manchester Arndale
- Merry Hill (Brierley Hill)

== See also ==
- Zavvi
