= Tollgate House =

Building in Bristol, England, demolished in 2005

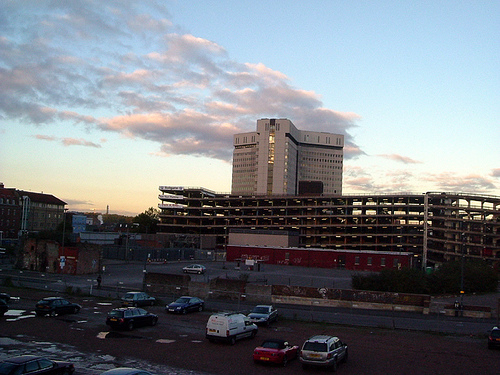
- Interactive map of the Tollgate House area

General information
- Location: Bristol, England
- Coordinates: 51°27′35.5″N 2°34′55.3″W
- Completed: 1975
- Demolished: 2006

Tollgate House was a nineteen floor office building in the city of Bristol, England. It was located at the southern end of the M32 motorway leading into the city centre.

== History ==
The building was completed in 1975 and was the second tallest building in the city at the time of completion, with a height of 77 metres (253 ft). It cost about £3.5 million to build and contained some of the most modern features in British civil architecture, including full air-conditioning. By the 21st century, it was regarded by some as outdated and unfashionable; the Royal Institute of British Architects (RIBA)'s president, George Ferguson, called Tollgate House one of the ugliest buildings in Britain.

In 2003, the site was compulsorily purchased for redevelopment by Bristol City Council. In December 2005, the council announced that Tollgate House would be demolished as part of a £500 million revamp of the Broadmead retail area. It was replaced by the car-park for the Cabot Circus retail development. The building could not be demolished by explosives owing to nearby properties, so was dismantled floor by floor. The work took several months to complete and was finished by May 2006, at a total cost of £3.5 million (the same amount to construct it in the first place). The development received a BREEAM rating of "excellent", in part for recycling 90% of the waste generated during demolition on the site. The project was part of a greater redevelopment of Bristol city centre.

In 2009, the council was ordered to pay £4.5 million to Ridgeland Properties Ltd, former owners of Tollgate House, after the compulsory purchase price was determined to be too low.
