= Broadmead Baptist Church =

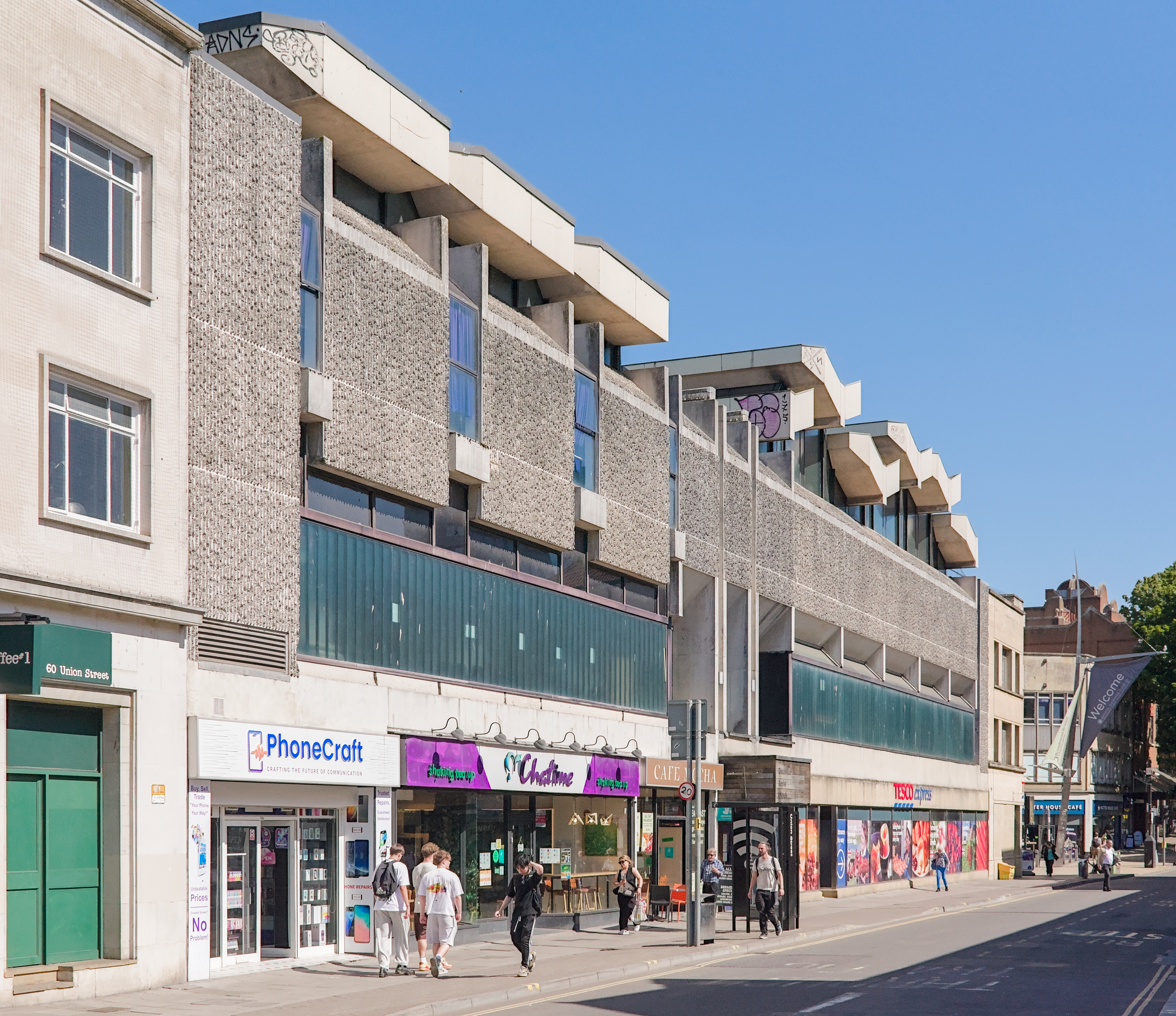
- Broadmead Baptist Church viewed from the corner of Union Street and The Horsefair

- shown within Bristol
- 51°27′27″N 2°35′29″W
- Location: Bristol
- Country: England
- Denomination: Baptist
- Website: broadmeadbaptist.org.uk

Architecture
- Architect: Ronald Hubert Sims
- Architectural type: Brutalist

Listed Building – Grade II
- Official name: Broadmead Baptist Church
- Designated: 28 August 2024
- Reference no.: 1489824
- Completed: 1969

Broadmead Baptist Church is a Baptist church in the Broadmead area of Bristol, England.

The church was the first dissenting church in Bristol, founded by Dorothy Hazzard and four other dissenters in 1640. In its early years the church was persecuted and met in various locations around Bristol, but in 1671 the members of the church secured four rooms at the end of Broadmead, which were quickly converted into one large room for use as a chapel. Records of the Bristol Quakers suggest that these 4 rooms may have been their meeting house between 1656 and 1670 when they moved to a new meeting house at Blackfriars. If so George Fox and Margaret Fell, key founders of Quakerism, were likely married in one of the four rooms in 1669. The chapel continued in use until the 1960s. When the Broadmead area was redeveloped the church sold the ground lease for shops and built a new church above. The new church was designed by the architect Ronald Hubert Sims and opened in 1969. It features many brutalist elements, with the widespread use of raw concrete alongside timber panelling. When first opened, it featured a laminated timber spire that was removed due to being unsafe.

The church was grade II listed in 2024 by Historic England.
