= Head Records =

Head Records Limited
- Company type: Private
- Industry: Entertainment retail
- Founded: October 2007
- Founder: Leslie and Jayne Whitfield
- Headquarters: Leamington Spa, England
- Website: headrecords.co.uk

Head Records Limited is a British entertainment retailer based in Leamington Spa. It was founded in October 2007 by Leslie and Jayne Whitfield, and became a chain in the United Kingdom and Ireland.

In January 2018, the chain went into liquidation and closed. In June 2018, Simon Dullenty, who had purchased the Head Records brand, reopened the Head Records store in Leamington Spa and established it as an online business.

== History ==
In October 2007, Head Records opened its first location in the former Fopp store in Leamington Spa.

In December 2009 and March 2010, Head Records opened its second and third stores in Bromley and at The Galleries in Bristol, the latter of which had previously been a Head Entertainment store; despite the similar name, Head Entertainment was a separate entity to Head Records.

In December 2010, Head Records opened their fourth store in Belfast's Victoria Square.

In May 2011, Head Records opened their fifth store Weston-Super-Mare's Sovereign Shopping Centre.

In January 2012, Head Records closed their store in Belfast's Victoria Square. In July 2012, the Belfast store reopened for business at a new location on Belfast's Ann Street, though it would later be relocated to CastleCourt shopping centre.

In September 2013, Head Records opened their sixth store in Warrington's Golden Square Shopping Centre, a former HMV unit.

In October 2014, Head Records opened a store in Blackburn, occupying the former HMV unit.

In December 2015, Head Records opened in Cardiff, within the Grand Arcade in the St. David's Shopping Development.

In early 2015, the Weston-super-Mare store closed. In July 2015, the Warrington store closed. In January 2016, both the Bristol and Blackburn stores closed down. In February 2016 the Leamington Spa store relocated to a new shop unit, opposite the shop unit they were currently in.

In October 2016, Head Records opened their first store in the Republic of Ireland, within the Liffey Valley Shopping Centre in Dublin.

In February 2017, the Bromley store closed. In June 2017, the Cardiff store closed down.

In August 2017, Head Records opened its second Dublin store, in the Ilaic Shopping Centre, as well as one in Galway's Corbett Shopping Centre.

=== Closure ===
On 4 January 2018, Head Records' parent company Indulge Retail Limited filed for liquidation, which led to all remaining Head Record stores closing down permanently on the same day.

=== Reopening ===
On 19 June 2018, Head Records reopened for business in Leamington Spa, under the new ownership of Simon Dullenty.

== Locations ==
- Leamington Spa (2007–2018, 2018–present)
- Bromley (2009–2017)
- Bristol (2010–2016)
- Belfast (2010–2012, 2012–2018)
- Weston-Super-Mare (2011–2015)
- Warrington (2013–2015)
- Blackburn (2014–2016)
- Cardiff (2015–2017)
- Dublin Liffey Valley (2016–2018)
- Dublin Illaic (2017–2018)
- Galway (2017–2018)
