= Ronald Hubert Sims =

British architect

Ronald Hubert Sims (30 March 1923 – 1999) was a British architect and artist. Influential in the Bournemouth area, he is best known for designing the Punshon Memorial Church which earned him the R.I.B.A. bronze medal in 1958. The church was demolished in 2015. In the 1960s, he designed the Broadmead Baptist Church in Bristol - it remains standing and is regarded as a fine example of Brutalist architecture. It was designated as a Grade II listed building by Historic England in 2024.

As well as his practical architectural work, he also spent a number of years teaching as a professor of architecture in Lincoln, Nebraska; Austin, Texas; and Waterloo, Ontario.

== Early and personal life ==
Sims was born in Christchurch, then in Hampshire (now Dorset). He married Hazel Sheppard in 1952.

== Examples of Sims's architecture ==
- Wallisdown Methodist Church (1954);
- Punshon Memorial Methodist Church, Bournemouth (1957, demolished 2015);
- Manor Road flats, Boscombe (1961);
- Lakeside Restaurant, Poole Park (1961);
- Broadmead Baptist Church, Broadmead (1969).
