= Cabot Circus =

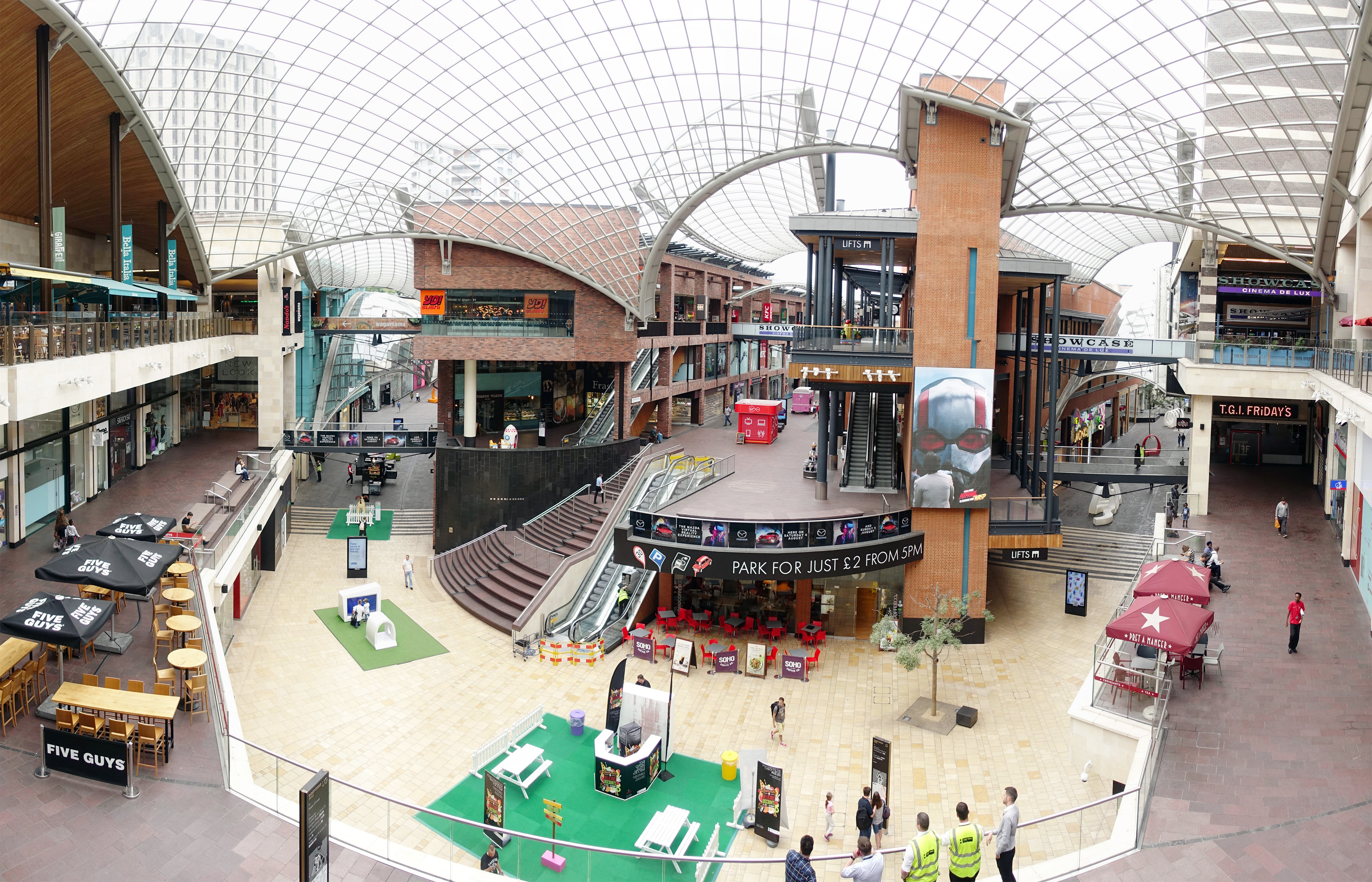
- Location: Broadmead, Bristol, England
- Coordinates: 51.459°N 2.585°W
- Opened: 25 September 2008; 18 years ago
- Developer: Bristol Alliance
- Manager: Stephanie Lacey
- Owner: AXA Real Estate (50%), Hammerson (50%)
- Num. of stores: 140
- Num. of anchor tenants: 2 (Marks & Spencer, Harvey Nichols)
- Floor area: 92,900 m^{2} (1,000,000 sq ft)
- Floors: 4
- Parking: 2,500 car spaces over 8 floors
- Website: cabotcircus.com
- (Retail & leisure floor area shown)

Cabot Circus is a covered shopping centre in Bristol, England. It is adjacent to Broadmead, a shopping district in Bristol city centre. The Cabot Circus development area contains shops, offices, a hotel, 250 apartments and an Odeon cinema. It covers a total of 139,350 m^{2} (1,500,000 sq ft) floor space, of which 92,900 m^{2} (1,000,000 sq ft) is retail outlets and leisure facilities. It opened in September 2008, after a ten-year planning and building project costing £500 million.

== History ==
=== Site ===
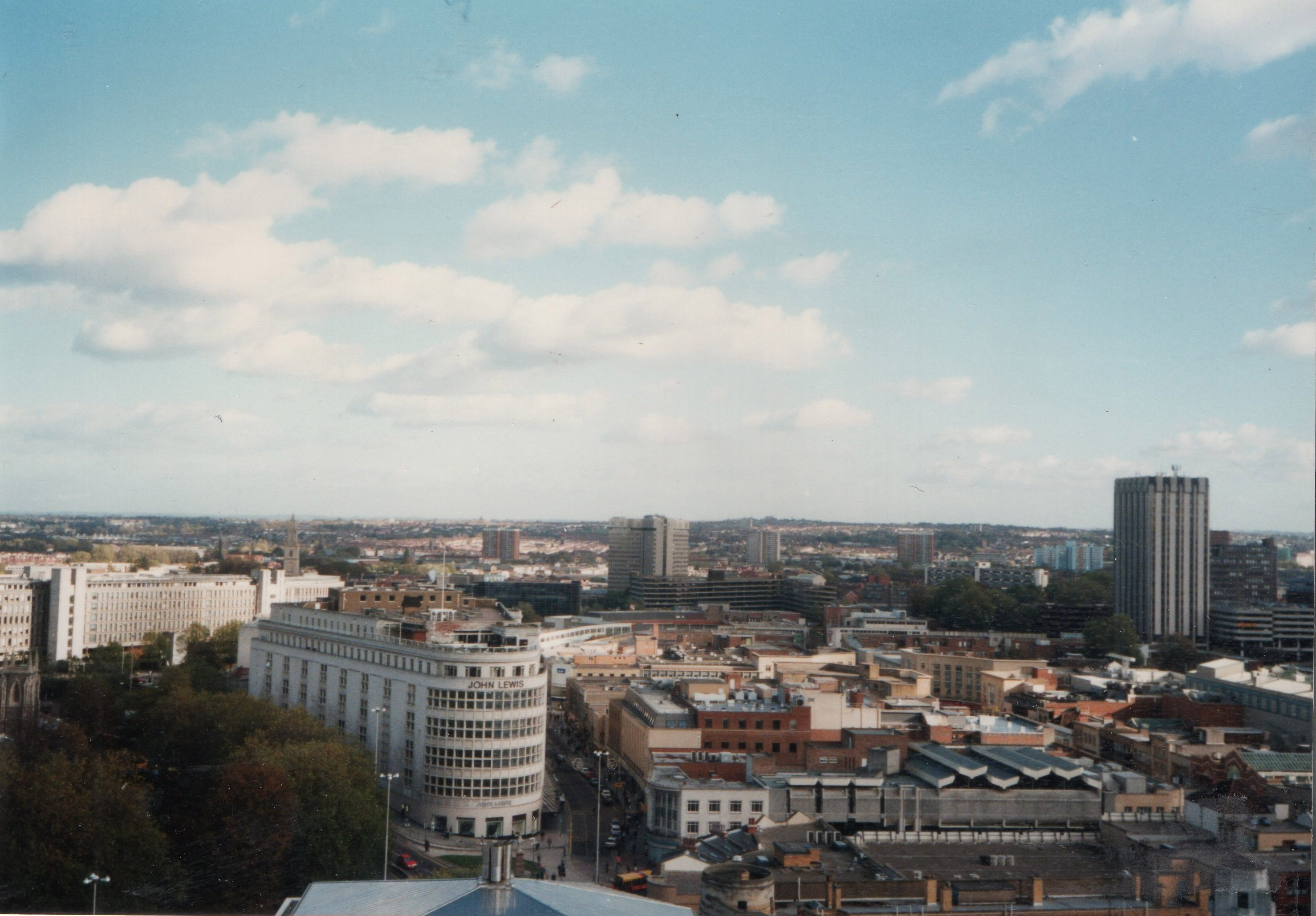
The Broadmead shopping area in 1995. Tollgate House is the tall structure in the centre of the photo.

Before the building of Cabot Circus, the site contained post-war shop units and part of the A4044 inner circuit road. Tollgate House and its car park were also demolished to make way for the re-aligned part of the circuit road away from its former junction in front of the Spectrum building, and the Cabot Circus car park. Many old streets were wiped off the map, although these had long been devoid of their houses. Part of the structure was built over the former Church of Saint Matthias.

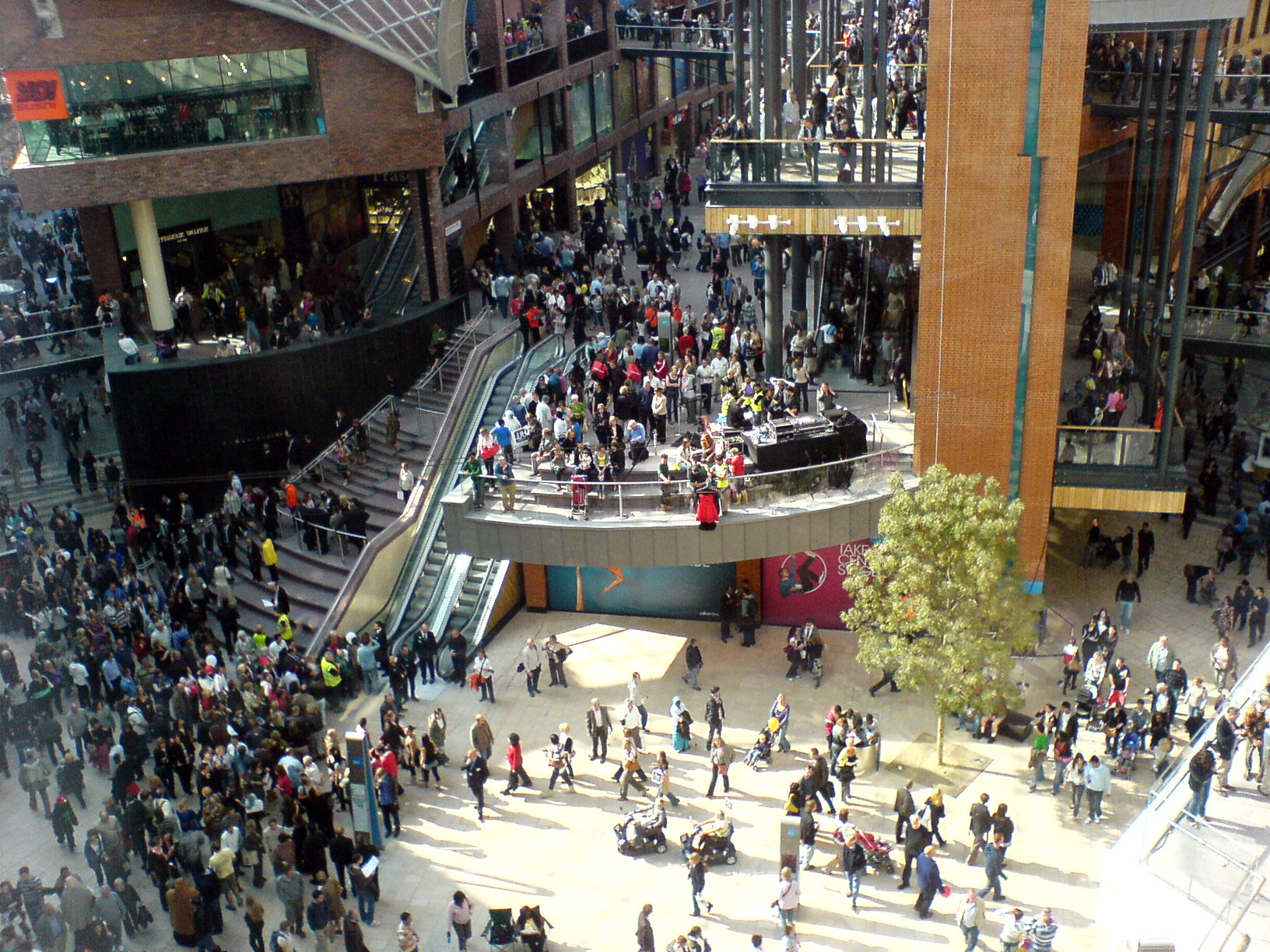
Opening day, 25 September 2008

The original chosen name 'Merchants Quarter' came under criticism due to its associations to the slave trade. The name of Cabot was chosen following a public vote taken in November 2007, and commemorates John Cabot, an Italian explorer who is closely associated with Bristol. Work began on the site in September 2005, following planning approval in December 2003.

Cabot Circus is split into two areas: The Circus and Quakers Friars. The Circus comprises three multi-level pedestrianised streets with a large glass-panelled roof as its focal point. The Circus was designed by Chapman Taylor architects.

The Quakers Friars development overlooks Quakers Friars, an 18th-century former Quaker meeting house, and comprises a curving retail parade with apartments above and an elliptical tower with a Harvey Nichols store at its base. It was designed by Alec French Architects.

Cabot Circus won the 2008 BREEAM Retail award for its sustainable design, including its natural ventilation, low energy lighting and rainwater harvesting system. The complex was opened to shoppers on 25 September 2008.

In October 2017, urban explorer Ally Law was arrested for trespassing onto the roof of Cabot Circus and performing stunts such as backflips atop the glass structure.

== Retailers ==
The development is split into two areas: the Circus itself and Quakers Friars. The Circus has over 130 shops, two department stores, several restaurants, and had a thirteen-screen Showcase Cinema de Lux until November 2023. At the highest level are the cinema and restaurants; there are also cafes and restaurants on the upper ground floor.

Quakers Friars has a series of up-market shops, restaurants, 230 apartments and associated public realm and parking.

Marks & Spencer opened in the former House of Fraser store in November 2025, returning to Bristol city centre after a three-year absence. Part of the former Showcase cinema reopened as an Odeon in February 2026.

== Transport ==
Cabot Circus is at the junction of the A4044 and A4032, close to the end of the M32 motorway. There is a 2,500-space multi-storey car park to the east of Cabot Circus, connected by a footbridge over Bond Street South. The closest railway station is Bristol Temple Meads, while several bus routes serve the area.

== Local community response ==
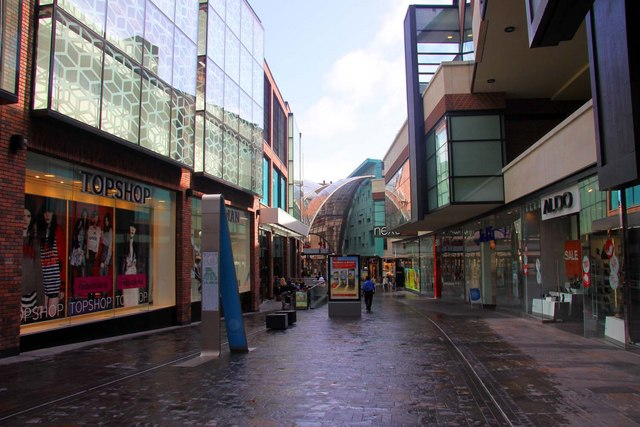
Shops inside Cabot Circus

In 2002, local newsletter The Bristolian reported, "Last Thursday residents of St Pauls met to oppose the Broadmead development: "Is Our Community under threat from Big Business Developers?" "The Broadmead Expansion Plan, backed by the council, will mean a massive increase in traffic congestion, pollution and parking chaos."

Bristolians and Bristol-based organisations have used Bristol Indymedia to criticise the development and the impacts it will have on their city. On the day of its launch, activists hung a banner from part of the development saying "crunch the cabot credit circus", linking the opening of a multimillion-pound retail development with the late 2008 economic climate and global credit crunch.

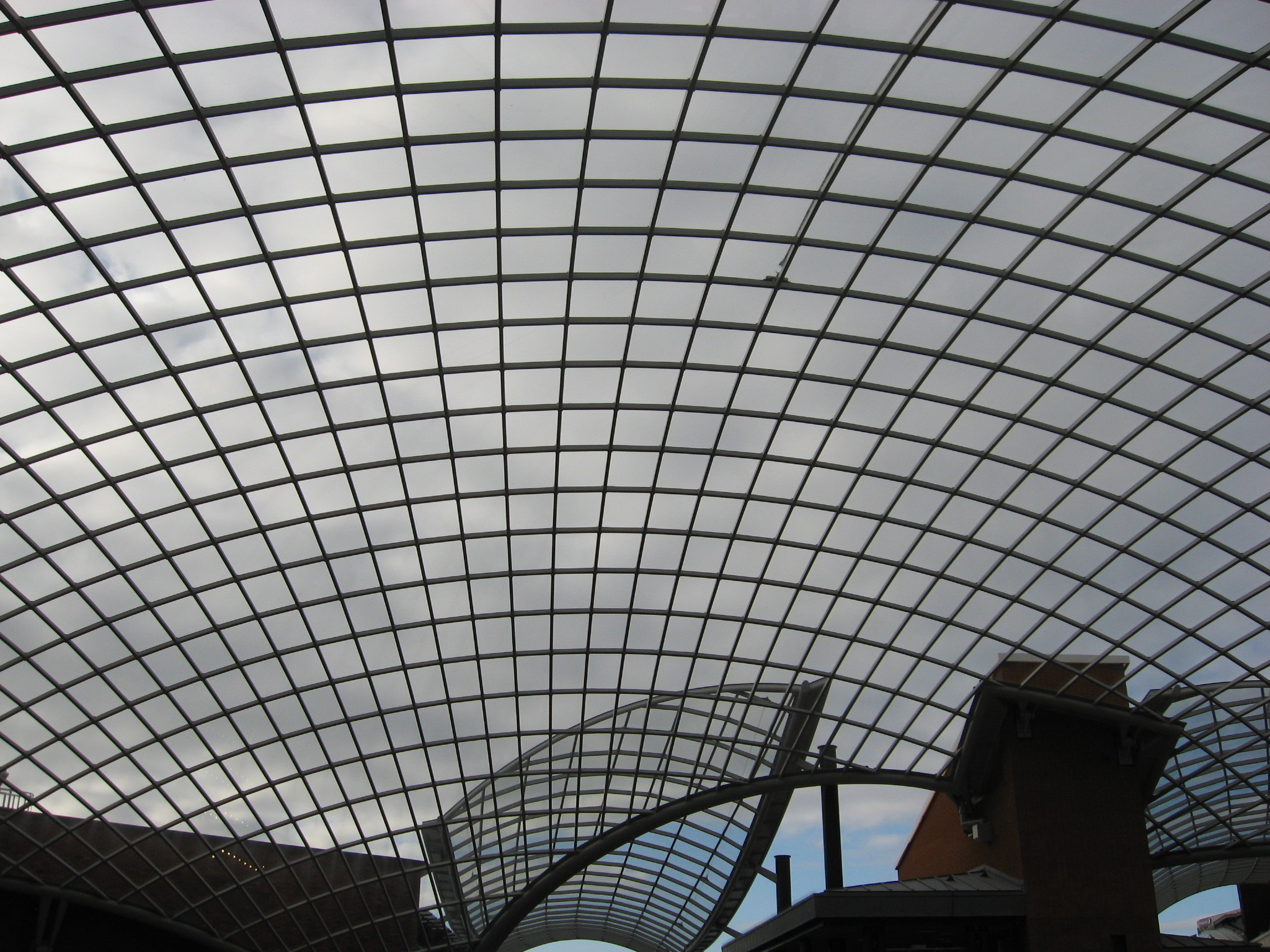
Glass roof above The Circus

== See also ==
- The Galleries, Bristol – a nearby shopping centre
- Trinity Leeds, a similar development in Leeds, also by architect Chapman Taylor
