= St Jude's Church, Bristol =

Former church, now apartments, in Bristol, England

St Jude's Church
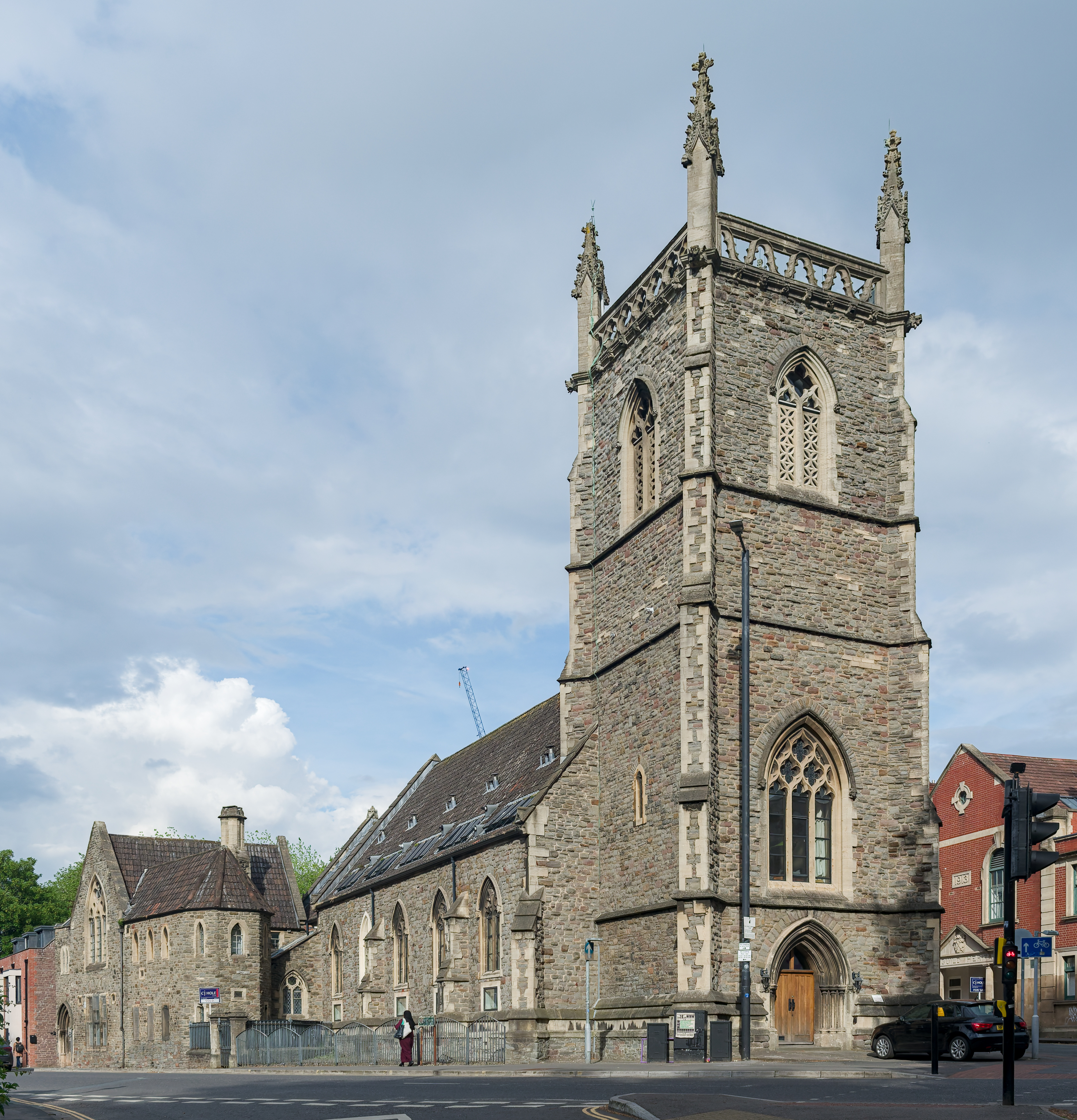
- Alternative names: Church of St Jude the Apostle with St Matthias-on-the-Weir

General information
- Architectural style: Gothic Revival
- Location: Bristol, England
- Coordinates: 51.45740°N 2.57997°W
- Construction started: 16 August 1848
- Completed: 31 October 1849

Height
- Height: 82 ft (25 m) (tower)

Technical details
- Floor area: Nave: 65 ft (20 m) × 28.5 ft (8.7 m); Chancel: 26.5 ft (8.1 m) × 28.5 ft (8.7 m)

Design and construction
- Architect: Samuel Burleigh Gabriel
- Main contractor: William Monks (mason); G. Monk and Son (carpenters)

Listed Building – Grade II
- Official name: Church of St Jude the Apostle With St Matthias on the Weir
- Designated: 4 March 1977
- Reference no.: 1204207

St Jude's Church, formally the Church of St Jude the Apostle with St Matthias-on-the-Weir, is a former Church of England parish church located on Bragg's Lane and Lamb Street in the St Jude's and Old Market areas of Bristol, England. Designed by Samuel Burleigh Gabriel in the Decorated Gothic Revival style, the church was consecrated in 1849 to serve the impoverished district once known as Poyntzpool, an area once associated with The Dings.

The church was designated a Grade II listed building in 1977. Following its closure as a place of worship in 1986, the building sat vacant and deteriorating for nearly two decades before being converted into apartments in 2004–2005.

== History ==
The church was established in the district known historically as Poyntzpool (later renamed St Jude's after the church), an area located outside Lawford's Gate. In the early 18th century, the land, then known as the Lamb Ground or Great Wells, was developed by Nathaniel Wade, who laid out a street grid including Wade Street, Great George Street, and Great Anne Street. By the mid-19th century, the area had developed a notorious reputation for squalor, crime, and social deprivation. Contemporary reports from 1848 described the locality as "one of, if not the most squalid and abominable, quarters of the city," noting that the specific site selected for the church had previously been a common ground used for "ruffianism," gambling, and boxing matches. The area was also historically associated with bull-baiting; the church was built on the site of the former "Bullring," near a thoroughfare colloquially known as "Bull Paunch Lane" (historically Bullpaunch Lane). The press characterized the construction of the church as the conversion of "a den of thieves into a house of prayer," intended to uplift a population of approximately 5,000, very few of whom could afford to contribute to the building costs. Early services were sometimes disrupted by local disorder, necessitating the erection of barricades around the church.

The ecclesiastical district of St Jude was consecrated under the Endowments of Populous Parishes Act 1843 (Sir Robert Peel's Act). Efforts to procure a site were initially difficult until Colonel Masters, the Lord of the Manor, donated the Poyntzpool land. The ecclesiastical district of St Jude was legally constituted by an Order in Council on 23 May 1844, carved out of the massive and overpopulated out-parish of Trinity Saint Philip and Jacob. The original boundaries were defined along the centre-lines of Eugene Street, Little Ann Street, Wade Street, Brick Street, and Bragg's Lane, extending to the River Frome. The foundation stone was laid on 16 August 1848 by Archdeacon Thorp. During the ceremony, a brass plate engraved by a Mr. Willett was deposited in a cavity of the stone.

The church was designed by the Bristol architect Samuel Burleigh Gabriel and constructed at a cost of approximately £2,979, plus £100 for the site. Bishop Monk of Gloucester and Bristol contributed by directing £1,130 from his Special Fund to St Jude's. Further funding included £280 from the Incorporated Church Building Society and £275 from the Parliamentary Commissioners. Upon completion, the church provided 549 sittings, 343 for adults and 203 for children. The construction work was carried out by William Monks (mason), G. Monk and Son (carpenters), and other local tradesmen, with J. H. Hirst serving as clerk of the works. St Jude's was consecrated on 31 October 1849 by the Bishop of Gloucester and Bristol.

In 1884, the church underwent a thorough renovation under the direction of architect E. Henry Edwards. This project involved cleaning the stonework of whitewash, installing a wooden dado, altering the choir stalls, and adding extensive interior decoration.

The church was struck by lightning on 7 July 1931 during a severe storm, reported to have struck the northern pinnacle of the tower, sending heavy masonry crashing into the road and damaging the roof of the aisle and nearby houses on Lamb Street and Lawford Street. In 1940 the parish was merged with the nearby Church of Saint Matthias.

In 1960 the coal-fired heating system was replaced with suspended heating equipment, installed with the help of parishioners. A large five-bedroom Victorian vicarage, located within sight of the church, served the parish until 1960, when it was demolished under a compulsory purchase order for nearby redevelopment. It was replaced by a four-bedroom house built directly adjoining the east end of the church on a site historically known as The Piggeries. Designed to blend with the church, the new vicarage was constructed using dull red brick. The project was overseen by the long-serving vicar, Father T. A. White. After the redundancy of the church, it sat vacant for many years. It has since been demolished, with the land redeveloped into five student housing units designed by Foundations Architects of Farnham.

=== Redundancy and conversion ===
St Jude's was declared redundant in 1986, having not held a service for nearly ten years prior to its sale. Following redundancy, the building faced an uncertain future, and in 1982, proposals were discussed for a local martial arts group to take over the premises. The church was sold at auction in August 1995 for £40,000, but the sale fell through when the buyer failed to complete the payment. It was subsequently re-auctioned in December 1995 and sold for £20,000 to a property developer. By 1999, the interior was reported to be in a poor state, though the pulpit and reredos remained in situ. Between 2004 and 2005, the building was converted into residential apartments.

== Architecture and fittings ==
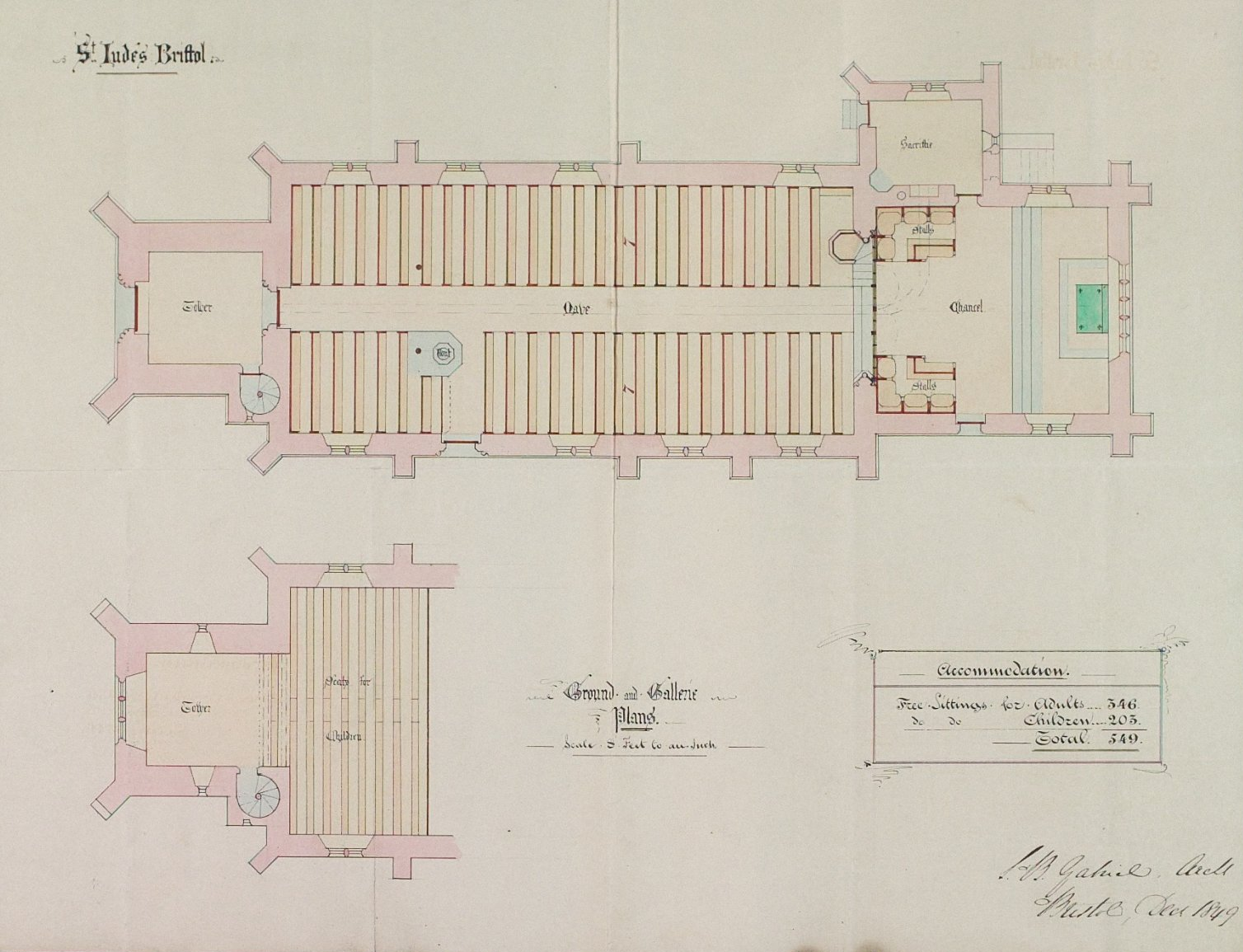
Floor plan of St Jude's Church by S. B. Gabriel, 1849

=== Exterior ===
The church is built of squared Pennant rubble with limestone dressings to a Decorated Gothic Revival design influenced by that of 14th-century parish churches. The layout originally consisted of a two-bay chancel, a low buttressed nave of four bays, and a three-stage west tower.

The tower is distinguished by a belfry stage containing two-light windows with open reticulated tracery. It is surmounted by an open parapet featuring "snaking tracery", gargoyles, and tall crocketed pinnacles. The west entrance is splayed, framed by three orders of shafts with foliate stops. Attached to the west end of the site are former school buildings.

=== Interior ===
The nave roof is open to the rafters, with principals resting on stone corbels carved with foliage representing vine, ivy, maple, and thorn. The chancel roof is of a polygon form, originally vaulted with wood. The 1849 consecration record described the chancel ceiling as being richly colored in blue and powdered with stars. The chancel arch was originally crossed by an oak screen with moulded tracery.

During the 1884 renovation, the walls were decorated with flowing conventional designs in various colors, including scrolls bearing the text Deus est caritas (God is Love) in the nave and Sanctus, Sanctus, Sanctus (Holy, Holy, Holy) in the chancel. The floor was paved with plain red and black tiles in the nave and Minton encaustic tiles in the chancel. The original font was a rich specimen of Decorated work, large enough for immersion. In 1895, a new font constructed of white and coloured marble was installed as a memorial to the Rev. J. R. Graham, gifted by his widow. This, and the reredos, was sculpted by Messrs Davey and Bushell. The east window, consisting of five lights with flowing tracery, was glazed with cathedral and Venetian glass during the 1884 renovation. In 1896 a new stained glass east window, made by A. F. Nott, was installed depicting Christ the High Priest surrounded by the four Evangelists.

The church's final organ was built in 1888 by W. G. Vowles of Bristol, originally for St Matthias on the Weir. It was transferred to St Jude's c. 1946. Following the church's closure, the organ was purchased for £1,000 in 1986 by St George's Anglican Church in Gawler, South Australia, following a recommendation by its organist, Eric Strange, a prior member and organist of St Jude's. The 1920s sacrament house by Martin Travers was also relocated to St Anne's Church, Greenbank.

== See also ==
- Grade II listed buildings in Bristol
- List of churches in Bristol
