= Dorothy Hazzard =

English Baptist leader

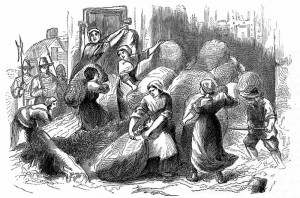
- 1882 illustration of Widow Kelly barackading the Frome Gate Against Prince Ruppert at the Siege of Bristol in 1643
- Born: unknown
- Died: 14 March (latest date), 1674; Bristol
- Other names: Dorothy Hazard
- Occupations: Baptist preacher, religious reformer
- Known for: Founding the first Baptist church in Bristol, defence of Bristol during the Civil War
- Spouse(s): Anthony Kelly, Matthew Hazzard

Dorothy Hazzard (also spelled Hazard, died 14 March (latest date), 1674), formerly Dorothy Kelly, was an English Baptist leader and religious reformer. She played a role in the defence of the city of Bristol during the English Civil War and helped establish Bristol's first Baptist church, Broadmead Baptist Church.

== Life and religious involvement ==
Hazzard's original name, as well as her place and date of birth, are unknown. She first came to notice alongside her husband Anthony Kelly, a grocer, when they started a religious group in Bristol. Their shop in the High Street was frequently targeted for its association with Separatists beliefs. She was derided for preaching and referred to as a "he-goat," and their home was attacked by those opposed to her leadership in a "Conventicle of Puritans."

By 1640, her first husband had died, but Hazzard continued running their shop. That same year, she married Matthew Hazzard, a Puritan preacher who later became the minister of Christ Church with St Ewen. Despite her new role as the vicar’s wife, Dorothy Hazzard’s personal beliefs remained aligned with the Separatist movement. She resolved her inner conflict after reading a passage from the Bible, Revelation 14:9–10, which convinced her to break away from the Church of England.

In 1640, she and four men—Mr. Atkins, Mr. Poole, Mr. Moone, and Rev. Bacon—founded the first Dissenter church in Bristol, which later became affiliated with the Baptist movement. Meetings were held at both the Hazzard residence and Rev. Bacon's house. This church evolved into the Broadmead Baptist Church, which has survived for over 300 years.

== Defence of Bristol in the English Civil War ==
During the English Civil War, Bristol came under siege from Royalist forces led by Sir Ralph Hopton. Hazzard, alongside her friend Joan Batten, led a group of women to the city’s Frome Gate to defend it, using sandbags to barricade breaches in the city’s walls and encouraging the soldiers during the defence.

Despite her efforts and a proposal to gather women to act as a human shield for the city, Bristol's governor, Nathaniel Fiennes, eventually surrendered to the Royalists. She later testified that she had placed her goods in the city for safekeeping before Fiennes’ surrender. Fiennes was found guilty by a council of war in December for surrendering the city and was sentenced to death but later pardoned.

Hazzard's role in the defence of Bristol was later commemorated in a mural by Gerald Moira commissioned for the Old Council House in 1923.

== Death and legacy ==
Dorothy Hazzard died in Bristol on or before 14 March 1674. She is remembered for her religious leadership and her active role in the defence of Bristol during the Civil War. The Broadmead Baptist Church she helped found remains an important institution, and a street in Bristol, Hazzard's Court, is named in her honour.

== Sources ==
- Salmon, Thomas (1730). "Chapter XL. The Trial of Colonel Nathanael Fiennes before a Council of War at St. Albans, for cowardly surrendring the City and Castle of Bristol, the 14th of December 1643. 19 Car. I. Taken out of the Account given thereof by Mr, Prynn and Mr. Walker.". In Emlyn, Sollom (ed.). A complete collection of state-trials, and proceedings for high-treason, and other crimes and misdemeanours: from the reign of King Richard II. to the end of the reign of King George I. With two alphabetical tables to the whole. Vol. 1 (2 ed.). J. Walthoe senior. p. 745–794.
- J. G. Fuller (1840). The Rise and Progress of Dissent in Bristol; Chiefly in Relation to the Broadmead Church, Etc. Hamilton, Adams and Company. p. 21.
