= Saint Matthias–on–the–Weir, Bristol =

Former church in Bristol, England

The church in 1900

The church of Saint Matthias–on–the–Weir was an Anglican church located in Bristol, England, near the present-day Cabot Circus shopping centre. Its parish was established in 1846, and the church was consecrated in November 1851. It closed in June 1940 following the union of its parish with that of St Jude the Apostle. The building was subsequently demolished.

== History ==
The church's interior

The parish of St Matthias was established on 23 June 1846, being formed from parts of the ancient parishes of St Peter, St Paul and St Philip and St Jacob. Its creation reflected the expansion of Bristol's population during the Industrial Revolution and the need for additional places of worship in the city.

Construction of the church took place in the early 1850s, and it was consecrated in November 1851. The building was designed by John Norton and constructed in the Decorated Gothic style. It was situated in the area known as the Weir, close to Rope Walk, in what is now the vicinity of Cabot Circus.

By the late 19th century, the church served a parish covering approximately 22 acres and could accommodate around 850 worshippers. Its parish registers date from 1847. During the 20th century, changes in the organisation of local Anglican parishes led to the union of St Matthias with the neighbouring parish of St Jude the Apostle. St Jude became the principal parish church, and St Matthias was closed on 24 June 1940. Following its closure, the church was demolished.

== Architecture ==
St Matthias-on-the-Weir was constructed in stone in the Decorated Gothic style, a form of Gothic Revival architecture popular during the Victorian period. The building consisted of a chancel, a nave, aisles and a western tower. Its east and west windows, together with several windows in the south aisle, contained stained glass. The interior also featured decorative stone carvings and was designed to accommodate approximately 850 worshippers.
