= Christ Church with St Ewen, Bristol =

Church in Bristol, England

Christ Church with St Ewen
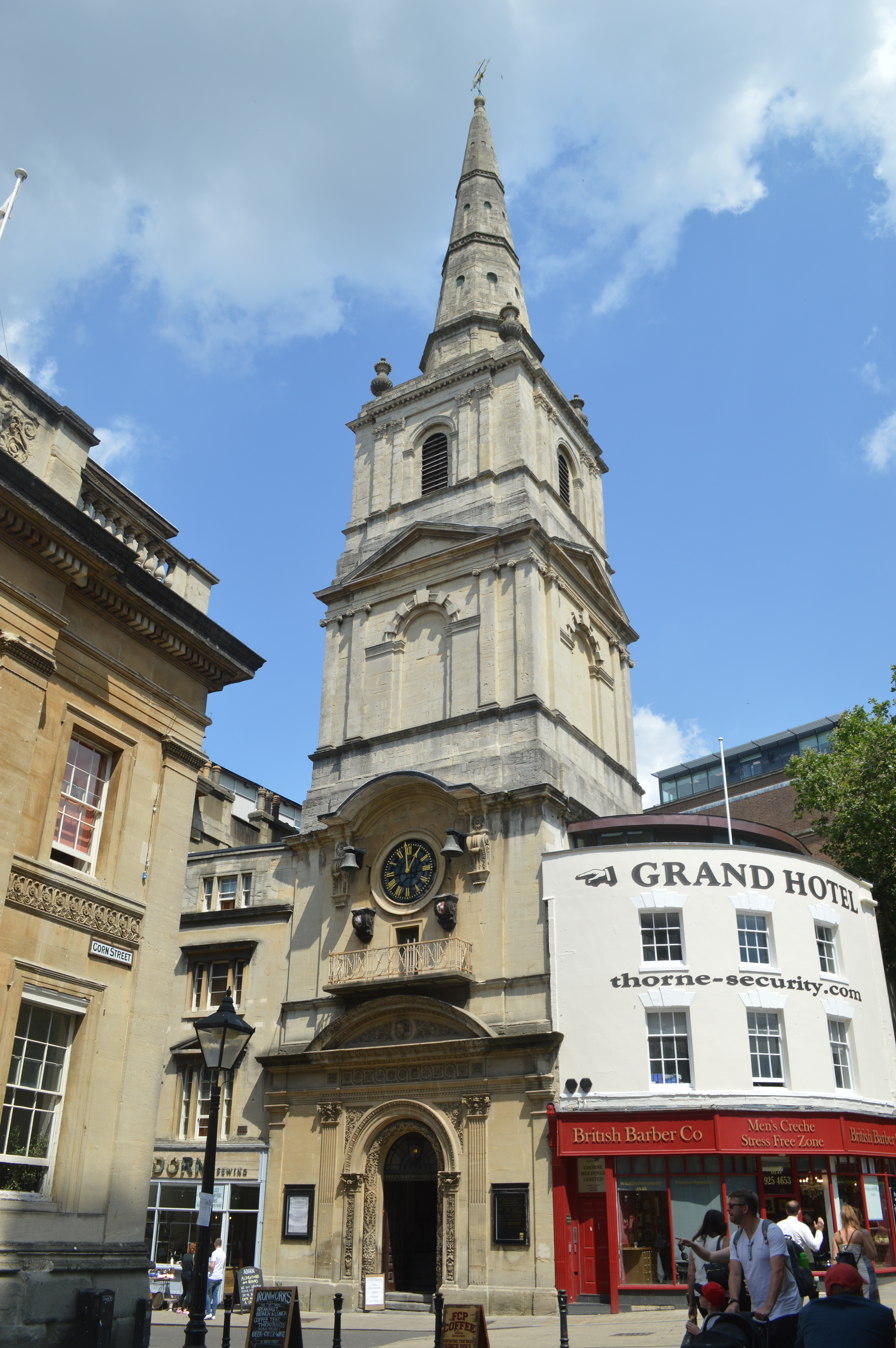
- Christ Church with St Ewen
- 51.4552°N 2.5929°W
- Location: Bristol
- Country: England
- Denomination: Church of England
- Tradition: Book of Common Prayer

Architecture
- Heritage designation: Grade II*
- Architect(s): Thomas and William Paty
- Architectural type: Baroque
- Years built: 1786–1791

Administration
- Diocese: Bristol
- Archdeaconry: Bristol
- Parish: Christ Church with Saint Ewen, All Saints and Saint George, Bristol

Clergy
- Bishop: Th Rt Revd Paul Thomas (AEO)

Christ Church with St Ewen (grid reference ST588730) is a Church of England parish church in Broad Street, Bristol, England.

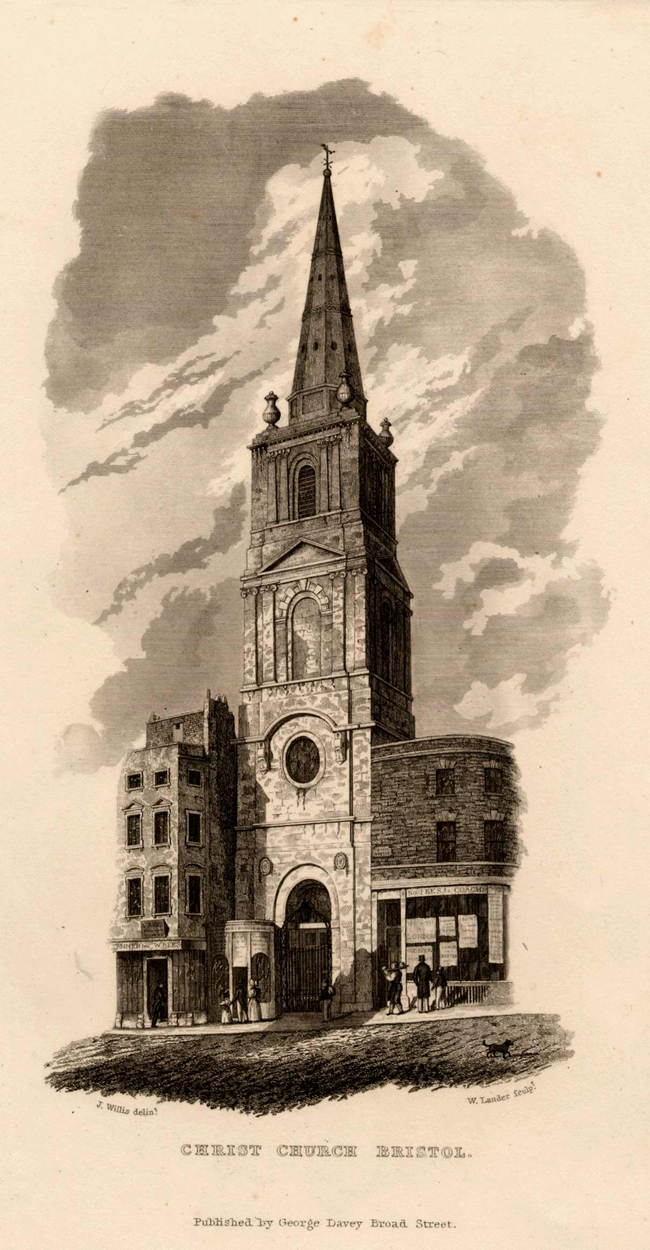
Printed engraving of Christ Church with St Ewen, Bristol, UK, from c. 1838 looking north onto the doorway and church tower. On the left and right of the image can be seen the surrounding shops on Broad Street. The image shows 4 children and a cat in a street scene.

Christ Church was built between 1786 and 1791. The tower appears to have been designed by Thomas Paty who was architect to the vestry, and the body of the church by his son William, and built by Thomas Paty and Sons, replacing a medieval one. The entrance and refurbished interior are by Henry Williams in 1883. The building was restored by Priest-in-charge Rev. G. S. Zimmern in 1973.

On the tower quarter-boy figures strike the quarter hours on the automaton clock.

It has been designated as a Grade II* listed building.

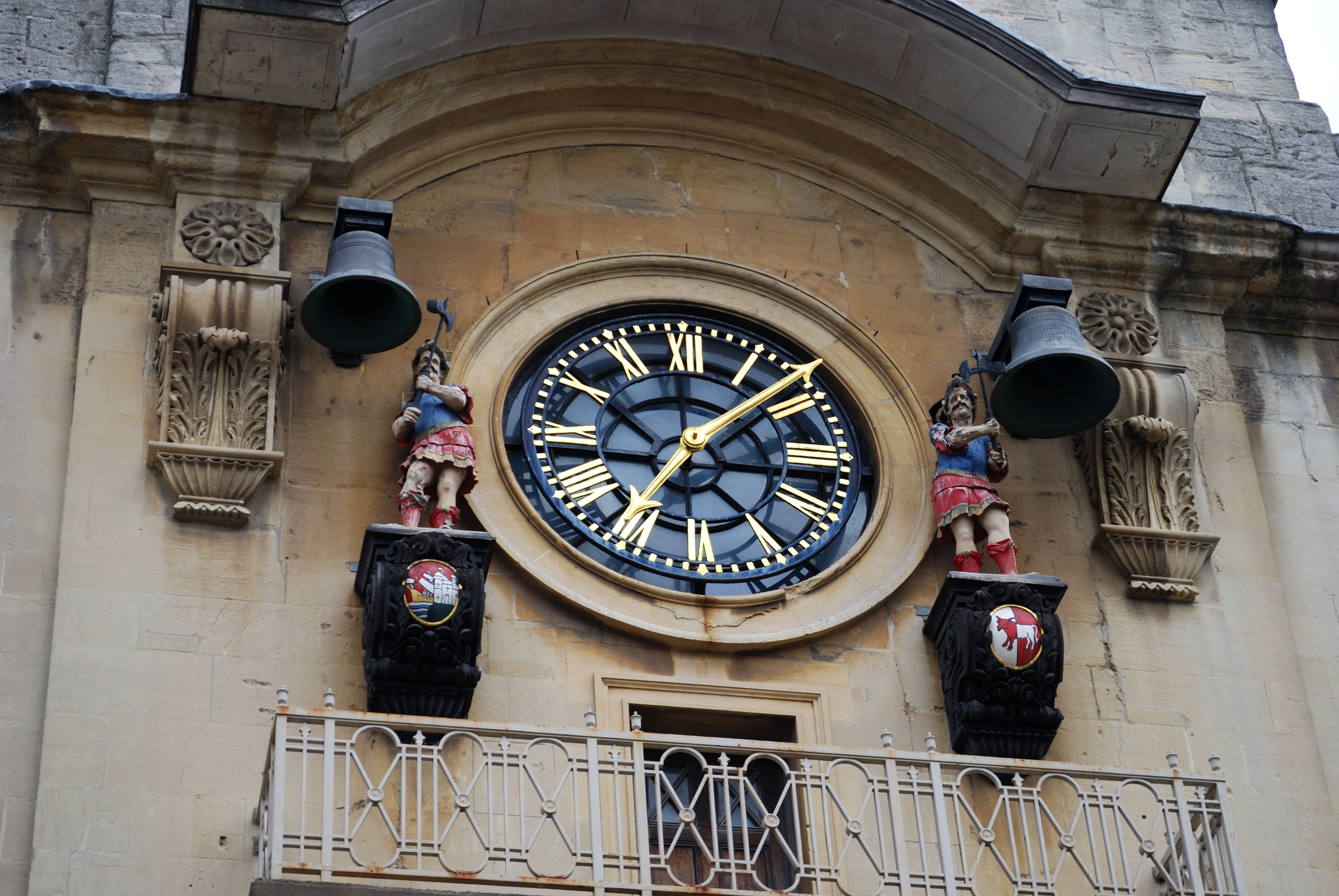
Clock on the tower

== St Ewen's Church ==
St Ewen's church was on the north west corner of the medieval cross-roads, opposite Christ Church on Broad Street. It was founded c.1141 by Robert Fitzharding, Earl of Gloucester. The Norman church was likely rebuilt in the early fifteenth century, consisting of a nave and two aisles, the southern aisle forming a chapel dedicated to St John the Baptist belonging to the Fraternity of the Tailor's Craft. In 1551, following the Reformation, the parish sold the chapel off to the Corporation of Bristol, so it could demolish the southern aisle and extend the city's Tolzey.

A charter of Archbishop Theobald of Canterbury, confirming a vicar called Turstin at the church and threatening that anyone who interfered with the post would be “firmly bound up in the chains of anathema”, is known as the Charter of Theobald or the Curse of St Ewen. It dates to about 1141 and is the oldest document held by Bristol Archives.

In 1639, Matthew Hazzard, was appointed vicar of St Ewen's, Bristol. His wife Dorothy Hazzard would allow pregnant women to reside at the parsonage (when they should have been at church) and they also gave homes to families en route to America.

The parish was one of the smallest in the city, with a congregation of just 56 communicants in the mid sixteenth century. The parish was joined with that of Christ Church in 1790. The church was demolished in 1820 to make space for the enlargement of the old Council House, now Bristol Register Office.

== Building ==
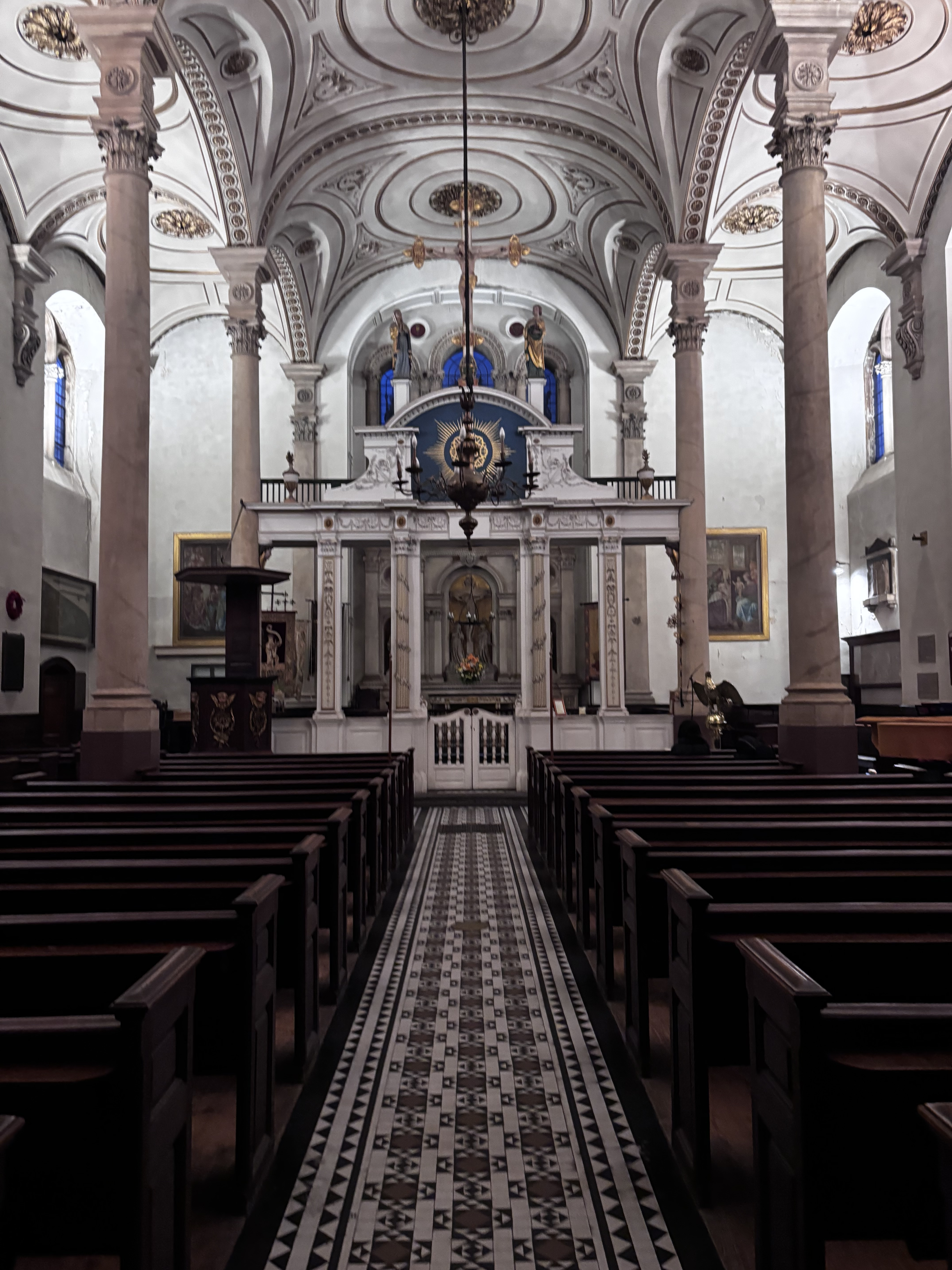
The interior of the church

The current Baroque style building, of Bath stone, was designed by William Paty and built between 1786 and 1791. A Victorian restoration was carried out in 1883 by Henry Williams.

== Worship ==
Worship at Christ Church follows the 1662 Book of Common Prayer and the parish supports the work of the Prayer Book Society in promoting the use of traditional liturgy throughout the Church of England. Scripture readings are taken from the Authorised Version of the Bible. The Parochial Church Council has passed Resolutions A, B and C and does not accept the ministry of women priests. It receives alternative episcopal oversight from the Bishop of Oswestry (currently Paul Thomas).

== See also ==
- Churches in Bristol
- Dorothy Hazard, wife of a Puritan preacher named Matthew Hazard
- Grade II* listed buildings in Bristol
