= Quakers Friars =

Historic building in Bristol, England

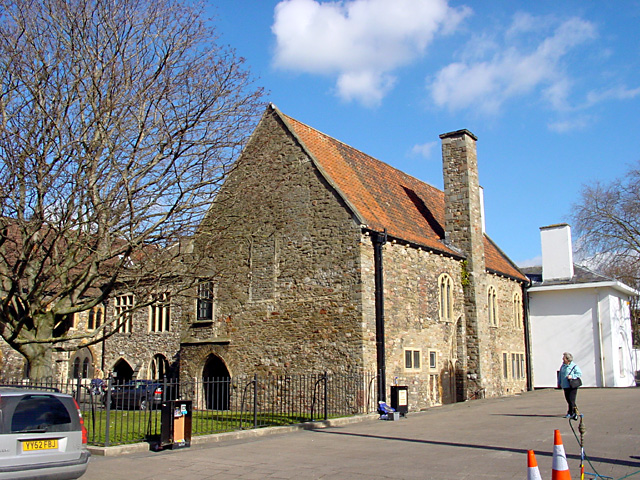
- West side of Quakers Friars showing the partially demolished Blackfriars Cloister

- Location within Bristol

General information
- Location: Bristol, England
- Coordinates: 51°27′26″N 02°35′16″W
- Construction started: 1747
- Completed: 1749

Design and construction
- Designations

Listed Building – Grade I
- Official name: The Former Quaker Meeting House
- Designated: 8 January 1959
- Reference no.: 1202463

Scheduled monument
- Official name: Dominican Friars (Quaker's Friars)
- Reference no.: 1007012

Quakers Friars (grid reference ST592733) is a Grade I listed 18th-century building in Broadmead, Bristol, England. Part of the former Blackfriars Priory site, it was used as a Quaker meeting house for nearly three hundred years, more recently serving as a registry office, a theatre, and a series of restaurants. It is an important site in both the early history of the Dominican Order in England and of the Religious Society of Friends (Quakers).

== History ==
=== The Blackfriars Priory ===
The meeting house was built adjoining the remains of the cloister of a Dominican Priory established by Maurice de Gaunt, c. 1227, some 12 years after St Dominic founded the order in 1215 and six years after the order came to England in 1221. Llywelyn ap Dafydd, the eldest son and heir of Dafydd ap Gruffudd (Prince of Wales 1282–1283), was buried here in 1287; he had died while imprisoned at nearby Bristol Castle where he had been confined since 1283. In 1480, William Worcetre's topography paced the church out as 170 feet long and 62 feet wide. The Priory was dissolved in 1538 and later partitioned and sold off, in part to the Smiths and Cutlers Company and the Bakers Company as their guildhalls, as well as a number of private dwellings. In the 17th century, much of the land came into the possession of Dennis Hollister, a prominent Bristol citizen who was a member for Somerset in the 1653 parliament.

=== The Quakers in Bristol and Broadmead Great Meeting ===
Quakerism arrived in Bristol in 1654 with John Audland and John Camm, two of a group of traveling ministers known as the Valiant Sixty who had been inspired by the spiritual message of George Fox (the founder of Quakerism) during his early missionary journeys around Lancashire and Westmorland in 1652. Camm and Audland were both from what is now Cumbria. Their ministry was supported by Dennis Hollister, a Bristol businessman and Baptist, who housed them and hosted the city's first meetings for worship in his orchard in Broadmead (originally planted by the Dominicans, and part of the Blackfriars estate) as well as in a room above his shop in High Street. Hollister's enthusiasm was sparked by earlier contact with the Quaker message in London, and was a scandal to many prominent citizens of Bristol. In spite of opposition this first mission attracted attention among all classes in the city, and many were apparently convinced. As Audland and Camm wrote in an epistle "To all dear friends who love the Light in and about Bristol" in 1654:

Every day we have a meeting; yea I may say every day is a meeting for go where we will all is full where we are both night and day… the house was all filled so the street: so the voice went forth.

George Fox first visited the Bristol Friends in 1656 and records meeting indoors at Broadmead in his Journal. These were held in a building on the site of the current Broadmead Baptist Church, known as the Great Meeting House. In October 1669 Fox and Margaret Fell, another key founding figure of early Quakerism, married in that first meeting house.

=== Old Friars Meeting House ===
In 1667, Bristol Friends proposed to construct a purpose-built meeting house with outside space for a burial ground and began looking for sites. The process caused some disagreement in the meeting. They finally agreed on a site in the old Blackfriars Priory owned by Dennis Hollister, during the time Fox and Fell were staying in the city for their wedding. The current Quaker Friars site was purchased by the meeting in 1669. The east range of the Dominican priory was demolished, and a new meeting house was erected in 1670 at a cost of £655 according to meeting records. The Baptists took over the earlier Broadmead Great Meeting House in 1671, having seemingly used part of the priory cloister as their chapel before. In 1681 a mob led by John Hellier attacked the meeting house during persecutions following the Conventicles Act 1670.

In 1746 the Bristol meeting recorded that the meeting house was becoming too small for the community, even though it now incorporated much of the remaining priory buildings (including the Cutlets Hall and the Bakers Hall) following various purchases. In 1747 the meeting house was demolished and more property was purchased to build an enlarged meeting house with a new carriage access. Among these properties was the "Old Orchard", where Camm and Audland had held the first meetings 90 years earlier.

=== New Friars Meeting House ===
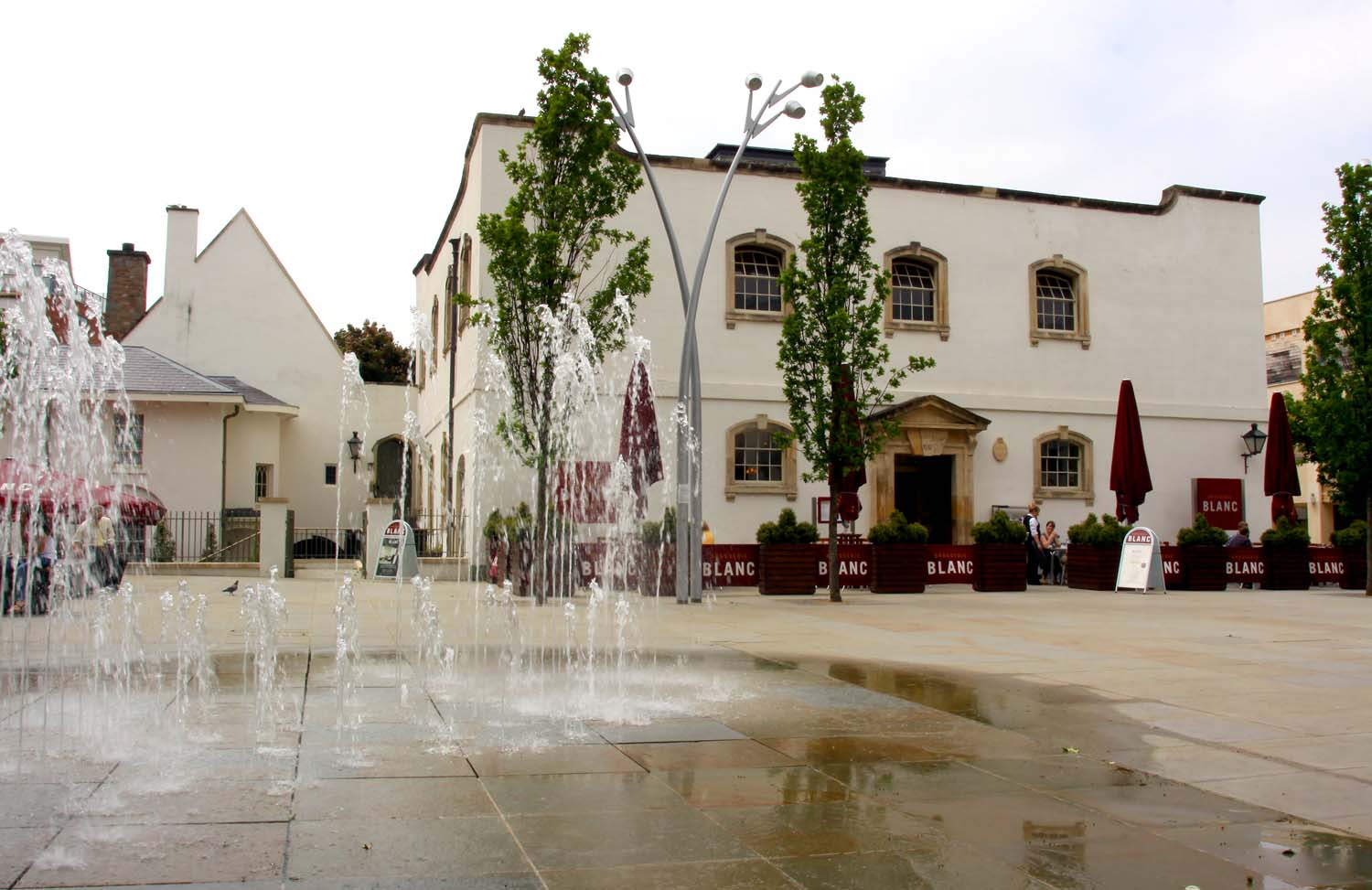
The New Friars Friends Meeting House (1749)

The current meeting house was built in 1747–1749 by Quaker architect George Tully who had possibly modified John Wesley's New Room nearby in 1748. Much of the moulding and detailed work was by Thomas Paty. It is a grand galleried space arranged around a central minister's gallery with eight Doric columns and an overhead square lantern light with tower (hidden in recent renovations). There was much elegant wooden decoration within, prior to 1956. The building works and materials cost £1,830 with land purchases and legal fees of £261. It was a landmark in Quaker meeting house design, and Nikolaus Pevsner observed Quakers Friars must be "the first building of the Quakers to accept this degree of monumentality or display". Some conservative Friends at the time believed it to be too ornate and a waste of money which could be better spent relieving poverty.

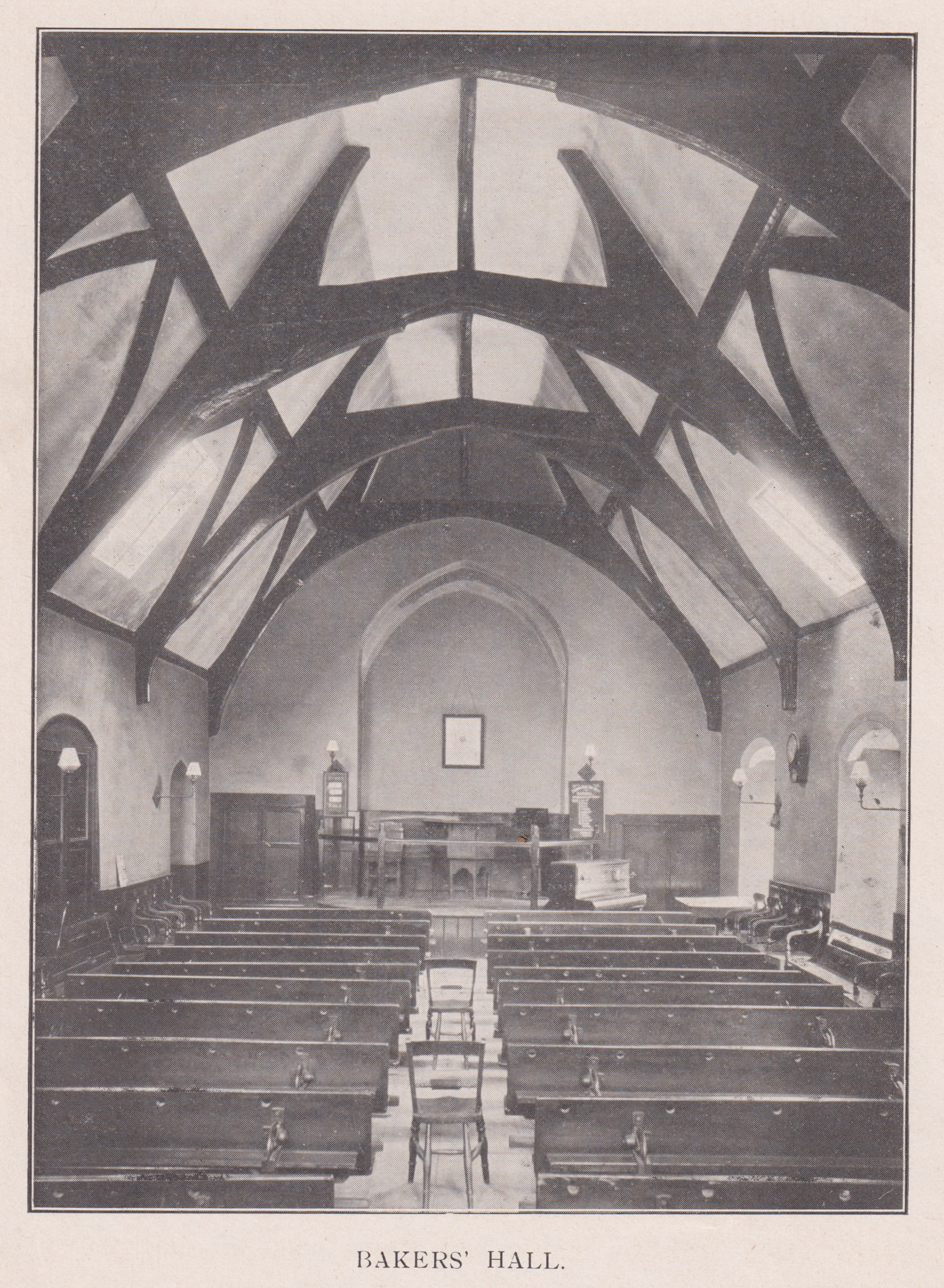
Bakers' Hall classroom, 1910

In 1828 the premises underwent a second significant enlargement with the purchase of all remaining parts of the Blackfriars priory cloister not already owned by the meeting, to serve as a school and a centre for charity work. From 1845 much of the premises was taken up by the school, including Bakers' Hall, Cutlers' Hall, the Cloisters and the Quadrangle. By 1910 the boys' school had 375 registered students.

The settings of the building saw significant changes over this period. Harvey's 1906 topography of Bristol described it as "once pleasant, now squalid", hemmed in by houses and factories so that few people knew of its existence.

In 1954 the meeting decided to sell the entire Quakers Friars site – both the meeting house and the old Blackfriars cloister – and build a smaller meeting house. It was sold as a unitary lot to Bristol City Council and the Quakers finally ceased meeting on the site in 1956. The building was designated as Grade I listed in 1959.

The Friars Meeting (now Bristol Central Friends Meeting) continues to meet nearby every Sunday in the Central Quaker Meeting House on Champion Square, opened in 1962.

== Today ==
After 1956 the building was used as a register office. In the first decade of the 21st century it was renovated as part of the Cabot Circus development, which saw many of the surrounding buildings replaced and provided a pedestrian square in front of the former meeting house. The building was then used by a succession of restaurants.

== See also ==
- Grade I listed buildings in Bristol
