= William Paty =

- Born: 1758
- Died: 11 December 1800 (aged 41–42)
- Occupation: Architect
- Buildings: Royal York Crescent, Clifton

William Paty (1758 – 11 December 1800) was a British surveyor, architect and mason working mainly in Bristol.

== Life ==
He was the son of Thomas Paty of Bristol a monumental mason and architect, and followed in his shoes. He trained at the Royal Academy Architectural School from 1775.

He was appointed City Surveyor of Bristol in 1788.

He died on 11 December 1800 and is buried in St Augustine's Church in Bristol. His wife Sarah died in 1807 and is buried with him.

== List of works ==
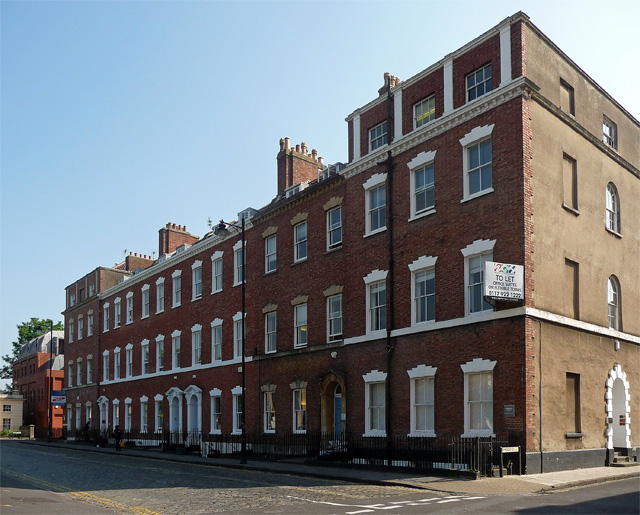
7-12 Brunswick Square, Bristol

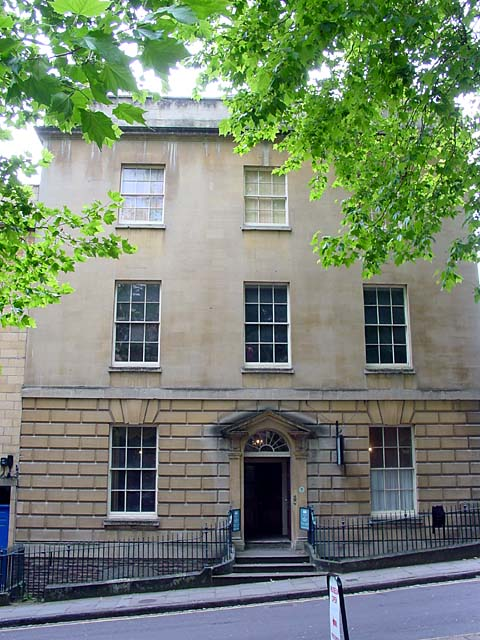
7 Great George St - the Georgian Museum, Bristol

- 7-12 Brunswick Square, Bristol (1784).
- 7 Great George Street (1789–91), now the Georgian House Museum
- 23, 25 and 27 Great George Street (probably at the same time as No.7, 1789-91), No.25 being the largest of them
- 85 - 91 Ashley Road, Bristol (1791-1795).
- Blaise Castle House (1795-6)
- Christ Church with St Ewen, Broad Street (1786-9)
- A memorial to Richard Musgrave (d. 1785) in Lismore Cathedral, Co. Waterford
- A monument to Samuel Peach (d. 1785) in Church of St. Mary the Virgin, Olveston, Gloucestershire.
- A monument to Agnes Chisholm (d. 1798) in Church of St Andrew, Cromhall, South Gloucestershire.
- Monuments in Aust Church, Gloucestershire.
- Monument to Thomas Stokes in Church of the Holy Trinity, Wickwar, Gloucestershire.
- Tablet in Church of St Mary, Lydney, Gloucestershire.
- St David's church Feeder Road St Phillips 1785 demolished 1897.
