= Blackfriars, Bristol =

Dominican priory in Broadmead, Bristol, England

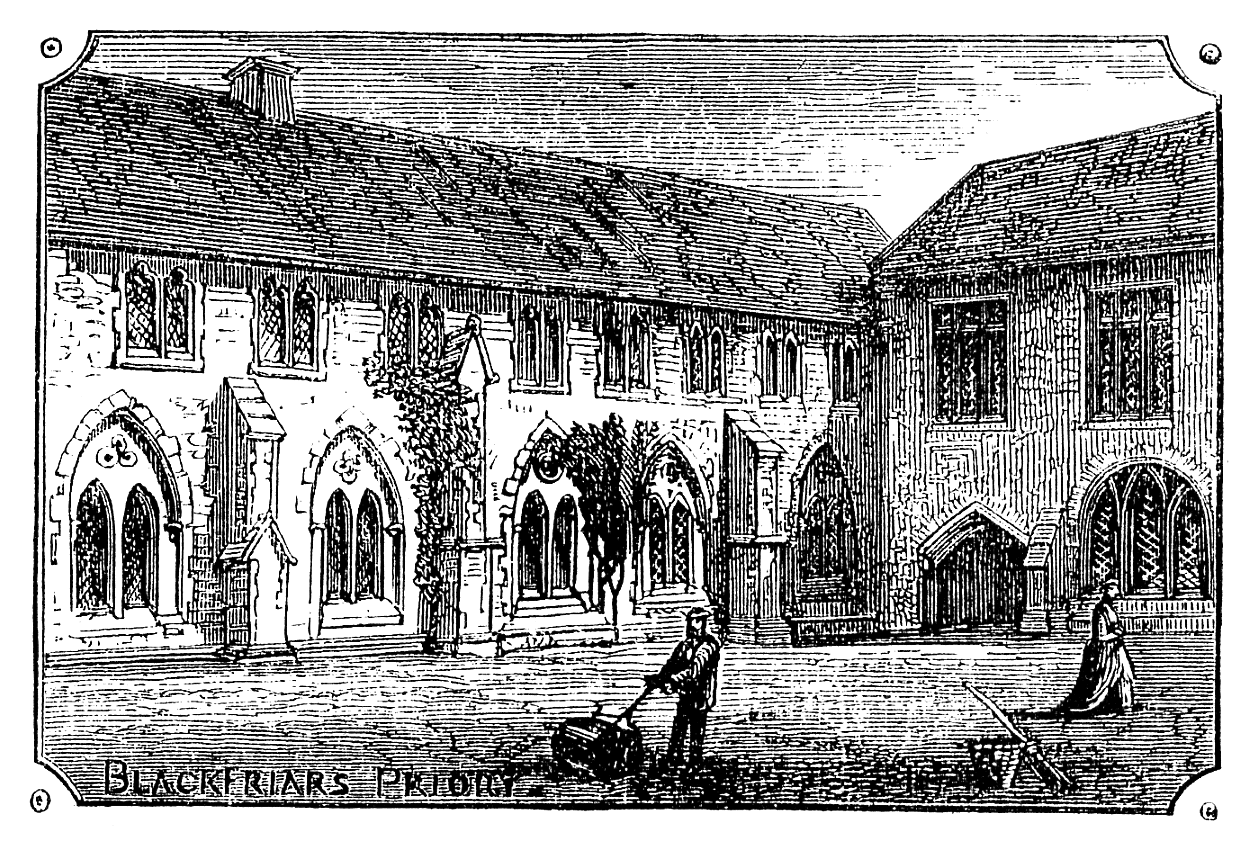
- 1873 engraving of surviving buildings

- Location within Bristol

General information
- Architectural style: monastic
- Location: Bristol, England
- Coordinates: 51.457296°N 2.58772°W
- Construction started: 13th century
- Demolished: part demolished in 16th century

Blackfriars, Bristol was a Dominican priory in Broadmead, Bristol, England. It was founded by Maurice de Gaunt in 1227 or 1228. Llywelyn ap Dafydd, son of Dafydd ap Gruffydd, the last native Prince of Wales, was buried in the cemetery of the priory. Following the Dissolution of the Monasteries in the 16th century, surviving parts of the priory became a guildhall for the Smiths and Cutlers Company, the Bakers Company, a workhouse and then Bristol Quaker meeting house. In the 20th century, it has housed the local register office, a theatre company, and a restaurant.

== History ==
Blackfriars was founded as a Dominican priory by Maurice de Gaunt circa 1227. The site in Broadmead was just north of the town walls. The name "Blackfriars" comes from the black hooded cloak that the friars wore over their white habits. Henry III supported the building of the church and priory, which took over forty years. Oak was supplied from the Forest of Dean and the king granted the friars charitable gifts and a moiety of fish landed in the port.

In 1232, a royal grant gave the friars the right to build a conduit to supply fresh water from Peniwell, now known as Pennywell. This conduit was later given to the Mayor and town council in exchange for a feather, a branch pipe, supplying fresh water from Baptist Mills. In 1287, Llywelyn ap Dafydd, de jure Prince of Gwynedd, died in captivity in Bristol Castle and was buried in the Blackfriars graveyard.

John Hilsey, prior of Blackfriars became provincial of the Dominican order in England in 1534. Thomas Cromwell appointed him as one of Henry VIII's visitors, charged with inspecting monastic houses and administering the oath of allegiance, under the Act of Supremacy. In 1538 during the Dissolution of the Monasteries, four remaining friars surrendered the buildings and contents. In 1540 the site was purchased from the king by William Chester, who had just finished a term of office as Mayor of Bristol. The area comprised some 6.75 acres (2.73 ha)

During the reign of Elizabeth I parts of the premises were acquired by the Smiths and Cutlers Company and they in turn leased parts of it to the Corporation in 1654 for use as a workhouse for poor girls. In 1669 the Smith's Hall and the adjacent Baker's Hall were acquired by the Religious Society of Friends and the premises began to be used as a Quaker meeting house, popularly known as Quakers Friars. In 1681 a mob led by John Hellier attacked the meeting house during persecutions following the Conventicles Act 1670.

== Today ==
Three of the original structures, much altered by subsequent use, survive and are listed buildings. These are the monastery infirmary, (alias Bakers' Hall), the friars' dormitory (Cutlers' Hall), and New Hall, which was largely rebuilt in 1869 but incorporates fragments of a 13th-century hall. The site of the Dominican Friary as a whole is a scheduled monument, granting it additional legal protections.

In the late 20th century the buildings housed Bristol Register Office and for a short time Show of Strength Theatre Company. Since 2008, following the redevelopment of Broadmead, a restaurant is located there.

== Works cited ==
- Latimer, John (1900). The Annals of Bristol in the Seventeenth Century. Bristol: William George's Sons.
- Weare, George Edward (1893). A Collectanea relating to the Bristol Friars Minors (Gray Friars) and their convent: together with a concise history of the dissolution of the houses of the four orders of mendicant friars in Bristol. Bristol: W. Bennett.
