= The Galleries, Bristol =

The Galleries
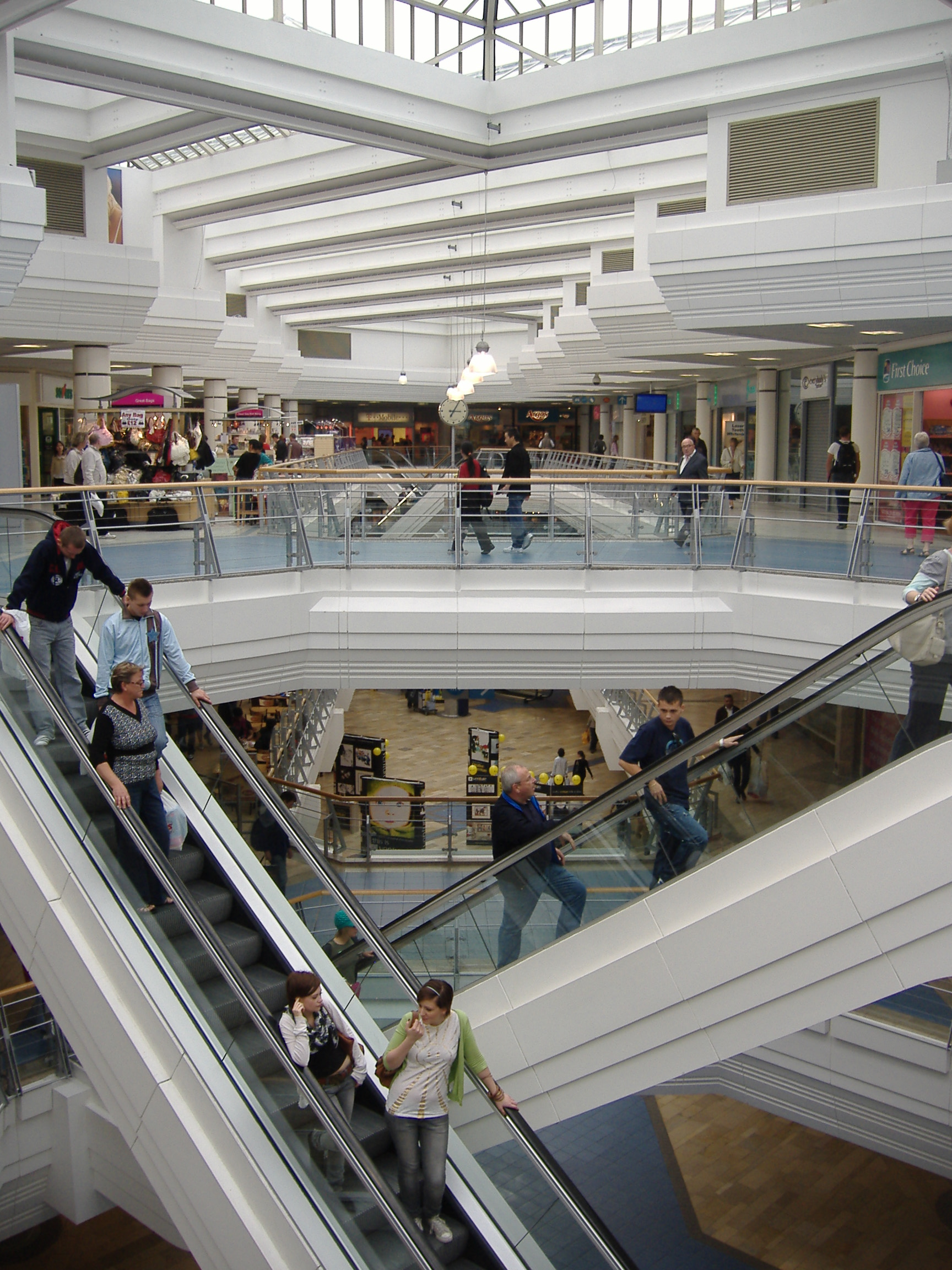
- Location: Broadmead, Bristol, England
- Coordinates: 51.4567°N 2.5897°W
- Opened: October 1991
- Owner: LaSalle Investment Management
- Num. of stores: 71
- Floors: 3
- Website: www.galleriesbristol.co.uk

The Galleries (formerly The Mall Bristol, but originally opened in 1991 as The Galleries Shopping Centre) is a shopping centre in the Broadmead area of Bristol city centre, England. Functioning as one of the city's retail centres, it is a three-storey building, which spans over Fairfax Street. Plans to demolish the building and replace it with a mixed-use development were approved in January 2025.

== History ==
The Galleries Shopping Centre, as it was originally known, opened in October 1991 in the wake of a UK recession. It was later bought by The Mall Shopping Centre Fund (and renamed The Mall Bristol), managed by Capital & Regional and Aviva Investors. It replaced shops including a large Woolworths on the north side of Fairfax Street, and on the south side Fairfax House (a Co-operative department store opened in March 1962) where the Galleries car park now stands.

One of the entrances, called "The Greyhound", was originally a historic public house which closed in the early 1990s and was incorporated into the building as an entrance.

In January 2011, the centre was sold to HSBC European Active Real Estate Trust for £50.1 million, and the name reverted to The Galleries.

With the opening of Cabot Circus and the recession of 2008, many of the chain shops moved out of the Galleries and into the new Cabot Circus. This resulted in several vacant shops and a decline of what was Bristol's main shopping centre in the 1990s and 2000s.

In 2019, the centre was sold by InfraRed Capital to LaSalle Investment Management for about £32 million.

== Redevelopment ==
Over the years, there have been a few re-developments. In 2011, the food court was moved from the top floor to the middle floor. There was a £1.5 million project to redevelop the entrances and to refurbish the mall in 2013.

In 2021, plans were announced to turn the shopping centre over the next five to ten years into a mixed development of residential property, offices and retail space. Since 2008, The Galleries had struggled to compete with the newer and larger Broadmead shopping mall, Cabot Circus. The plans were approved in January 2025.

== Transport ==
The Galleries is within walking distance of Bristol Temple Meads station and is served by First West of England bus services at nearby bus stops. There is also a car park with nearly 1,000 spaces, which can be accessed from Fairfax Street and New Gate.
