= Broadmead =

Area of Bristol, England

Coordinates: 51.457°N 2.588°W

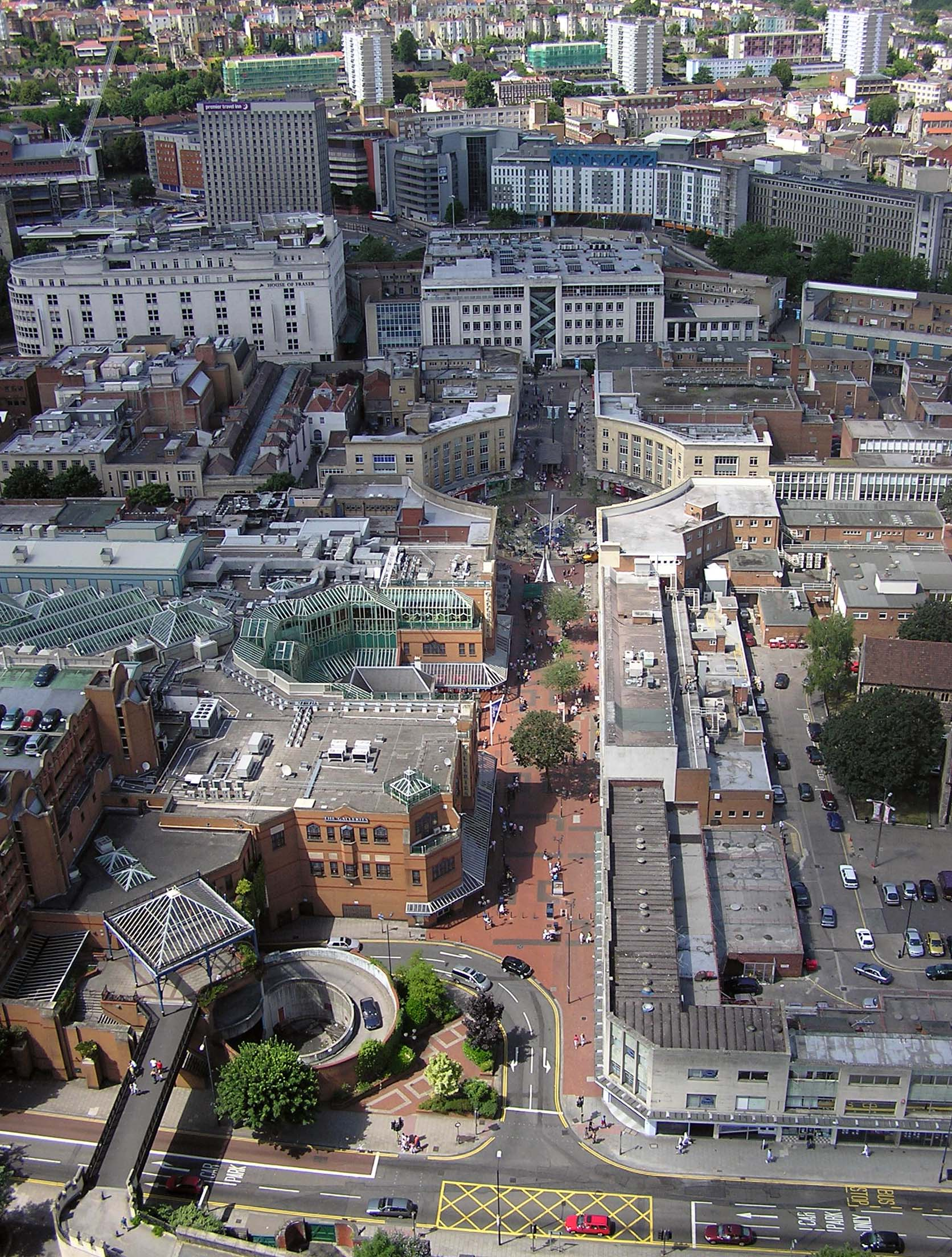
Part of Broadmead Shopping Centre

Broadmead is a street in Bristol city centre in England, which has given its name to the principal shopping district of the city. It is part of Bristol Shopping Quarter.

== History ==
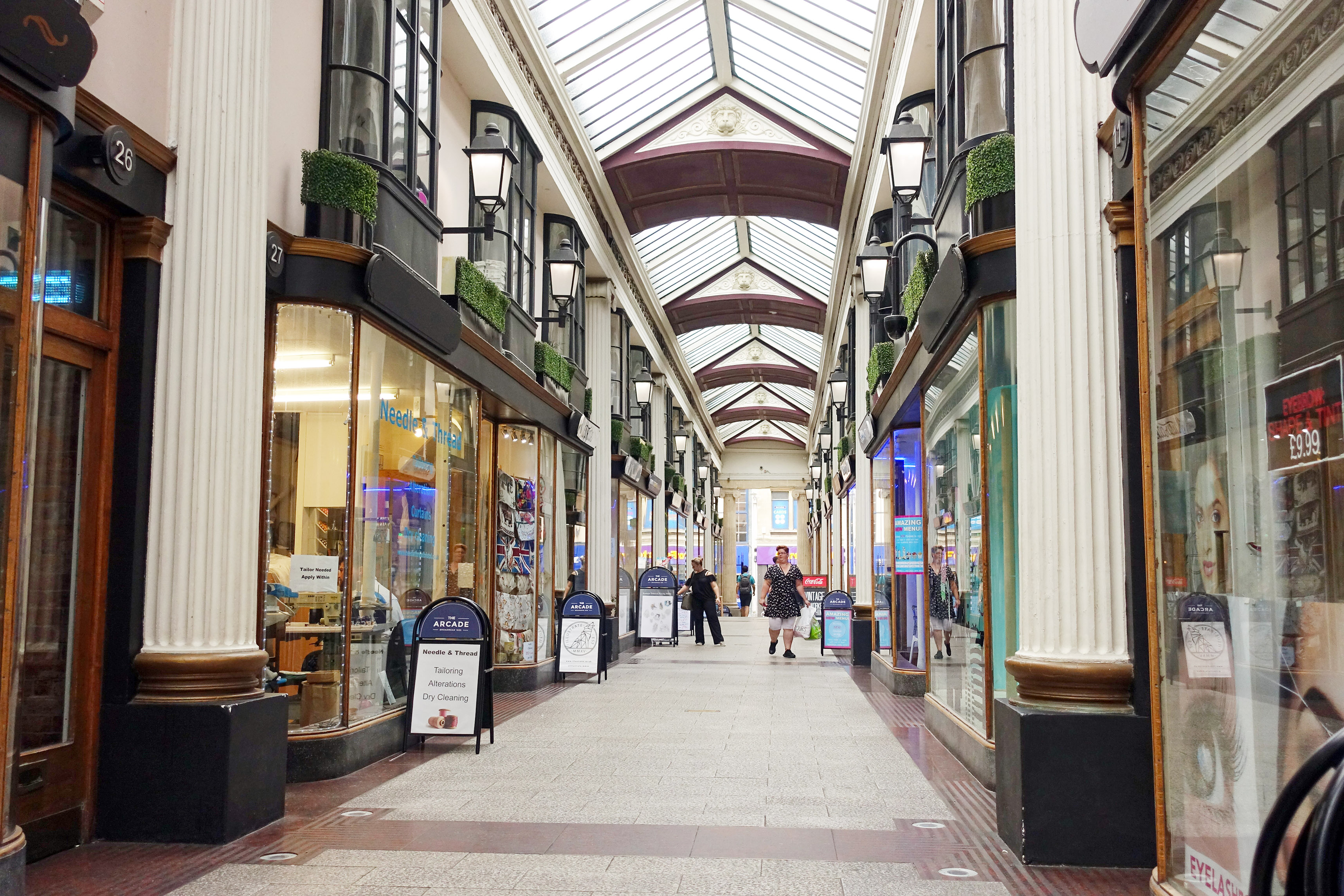
The Arcade, built in 1825

The name of the street was first recorded in 1383 as Brodemede. The name either means "broad meadow" or refers to brodemedes, a type of woollen cloth woven only in Bristol.

The area lay just to the north of the town walls of the historic Bristol. In about 1227 Blackfriars was founded as a Dominican priory in the area. After the dissolution of the monasteries the site had various secular uses, and in 1749 became the location of a Quaker meeting house, now known as Quakers Friars. In 1671 local dissenters opened the Broadmead Baptist Chapel near the junction of Broadmead and Union Street. In 1739 John Wesley built his Methodist chapel, known as the New Room, in the street. Shops were also built in the area. In 1825 a covered arcade was built between Horsefair and Broadmead, which still survives and is the second oldest building in Broadmead. Originally accompanied by another section, the Upper Arcade, but that was destroyed by 1940 bombing. St James' Priory, founded 1129, is northwest of Broadmead and Castle Park, the site of the Norman Bristol Castle, is to the south.

When the old shopping district of Castle Street and Wine Street was heavily damaged in the Bristol Blitz, it was decided to redevelop the Broadmead area as the main shopping district of the city. Rebuilding began in 1950. The existing street, which ran between Union Street and Merchant Street, was extended north to include the former Rosemary Street. Like most 1950s buildings in Britain, affordable and architecturally uninteresting utilitarian buildings form the bulk of the Broadmead area. In the 1980s some of these were removed to make way for the Galleries shopping centre, which is a three level covered street. Broadmead and several of the surrounding streets were pedestrianised.

== Broadmead today ==
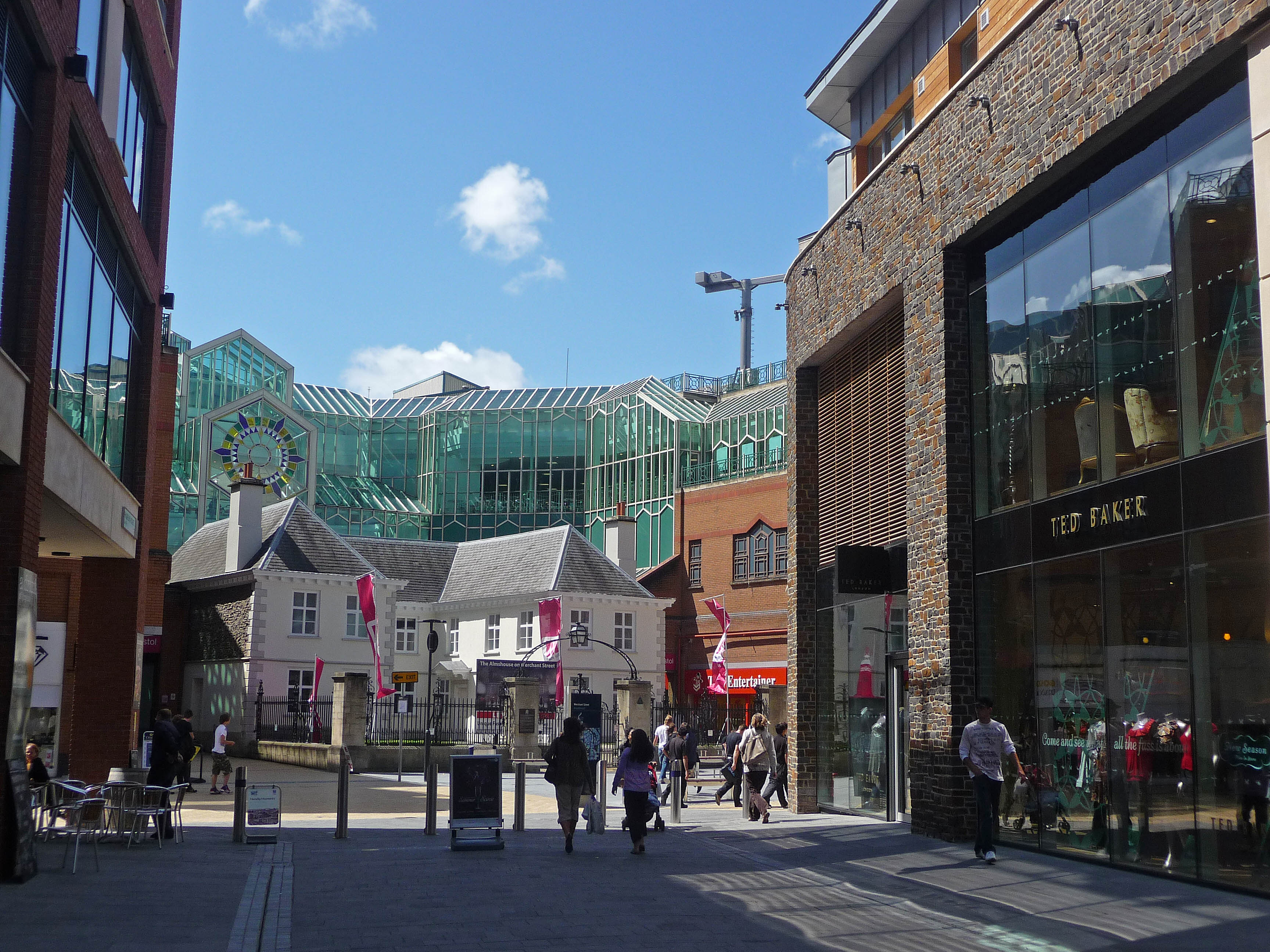
North-east entrance to The Galleries

A regeneration project for Broadmead finished about 2010. The shopping area has been extended over the central ring road to produce a new shopping centre, Cabot Circus, which opened in September 2008. This area had been named Merchants Quarter but in April 2006 the name was abandoned after a campaign claiming the name was offensive because it was the Bristol Merchant Venturers who dealt in the trade of African slaves.

In 1987, the shopping centre was the scene of an abduction that received national attention. On 8 October 1987, 29-year-old newly-wed Shirley Banks was abducted by serial killer John Cannan as she walked back to her car. Her body was found on Easter Day 1988. Cannan was convicted of her abduction and murder.

A business improvement district (BID) was established for Broadmead in 2005, with a current plan that extends to 2028.

In 2021, flagship shop Debenhams closed following the chain's bankruptcy, and the closure of the Marks & Spencer branch was announced for January 2022.

== Public Transport ==
Broadmead is served by various bus services and is immediately south of Bristol bus station. Bristol Temple Meads station is about half a mile south east.
