= Samuel Loxton =

English illustrator

- Born: 6 January 1857; Clifton, Bristol
- Died: 5 February 1922 (aged 65); Bristol
- Employer: Western Daily Press
- Known for: Illustrator and artist

Samuel Joseph Loxton (6 January 1857 – 5 February 1922) was an English illustrator and artist who worked primarily in Bristol and the west of England for regional newspapers.

== Life ==
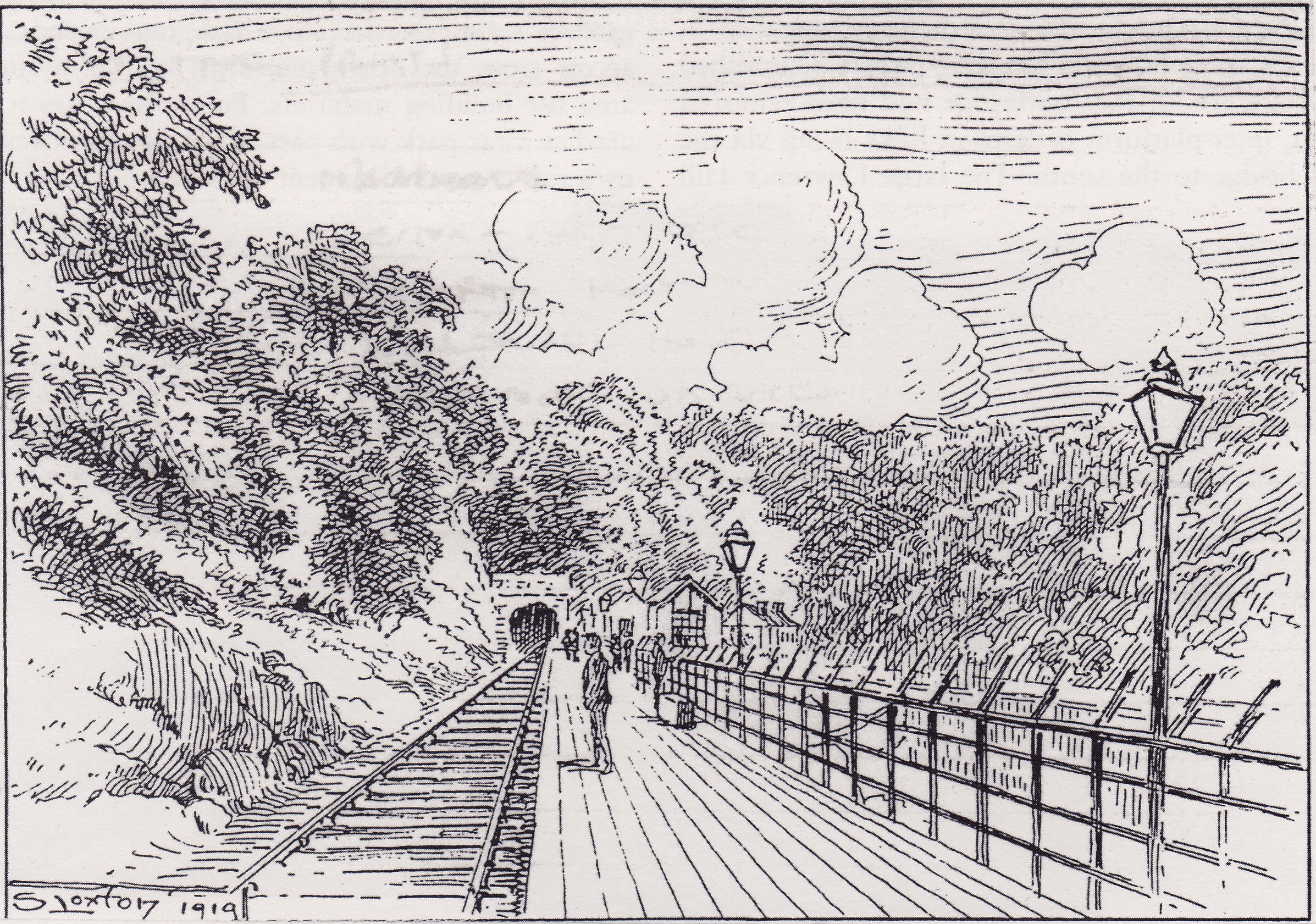
A 1919 Loxton illustration of Hotwells Halt railway station.

Loxton began his career as a draughtsman for the Ordnance Survey Department but from c.1890 he contributed black and white drawings to the Bristol Observer, The Western Daily Press and the Bristol Evening News. He was best known for his architectural drawings. He worked closely with the Bristol journalist and editor of the Daily Press, George Frederick Stone, with whom he produced a popular series of historical articles for the Observer.

Loxton died on 5 February 1922 following a period of ill health and was buried in Canford Cemetery, Westbury-on-Trym, leaving a widow and two grown up daughters.

== Illustrations ==
Many of Loxton's illustrations of Bristol were republished in a contemporary history of the city, published in 1909 with George F. Stone. Eighty of his illustrations of Edwardian Bristol were republished in print form in 1992.

About 2,000 of Loxton's original drawings were left to Bristol Central Library. The library have scanned these and made copies of them available on its Flickr site, at resolutions ranging up to c. 200 KB. The Bristol Record Society produced higher-resolution scans of some of the images (up to 6 MB), taken from Stone's volume. These have been uploaded to Wikimedia. Many of these images are included below in the gallery: 'Loxton's images of Bristol'.

Gallery: Loxton's images of Bristol

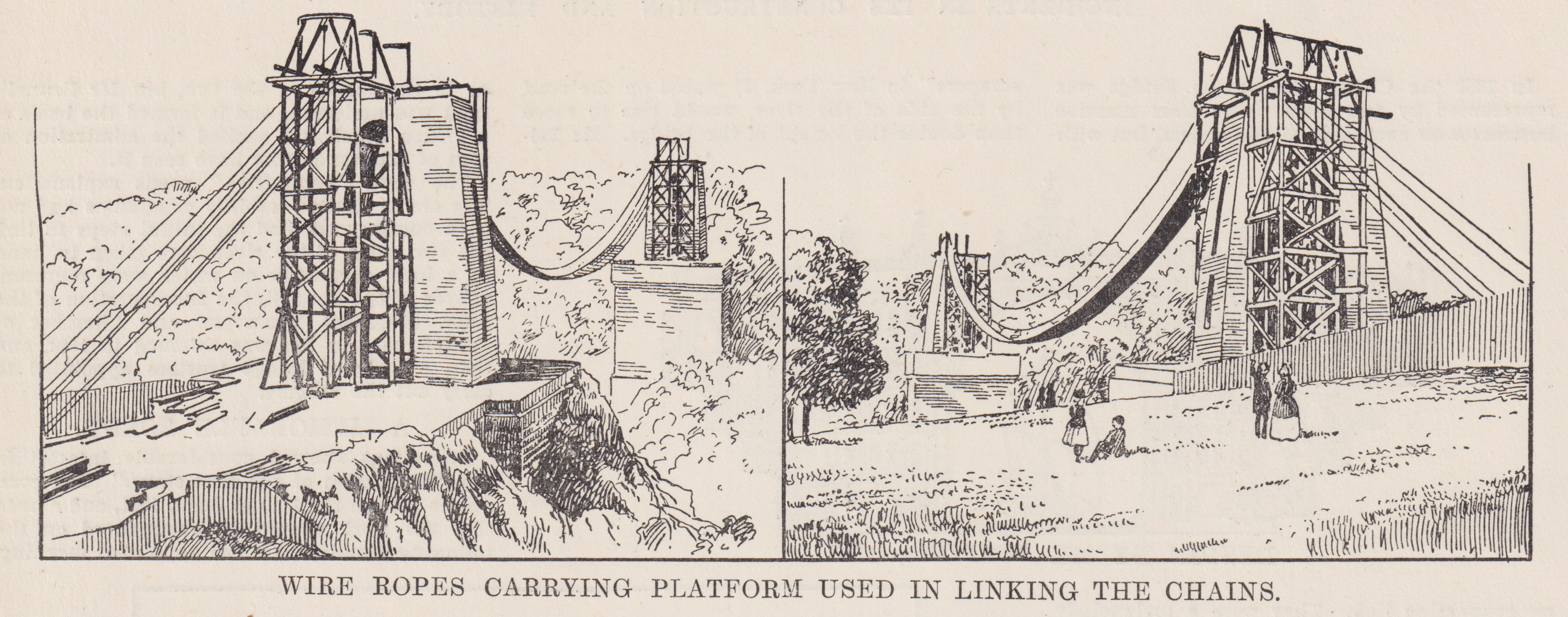
Clifton Suspension Bridge under construction c.1861

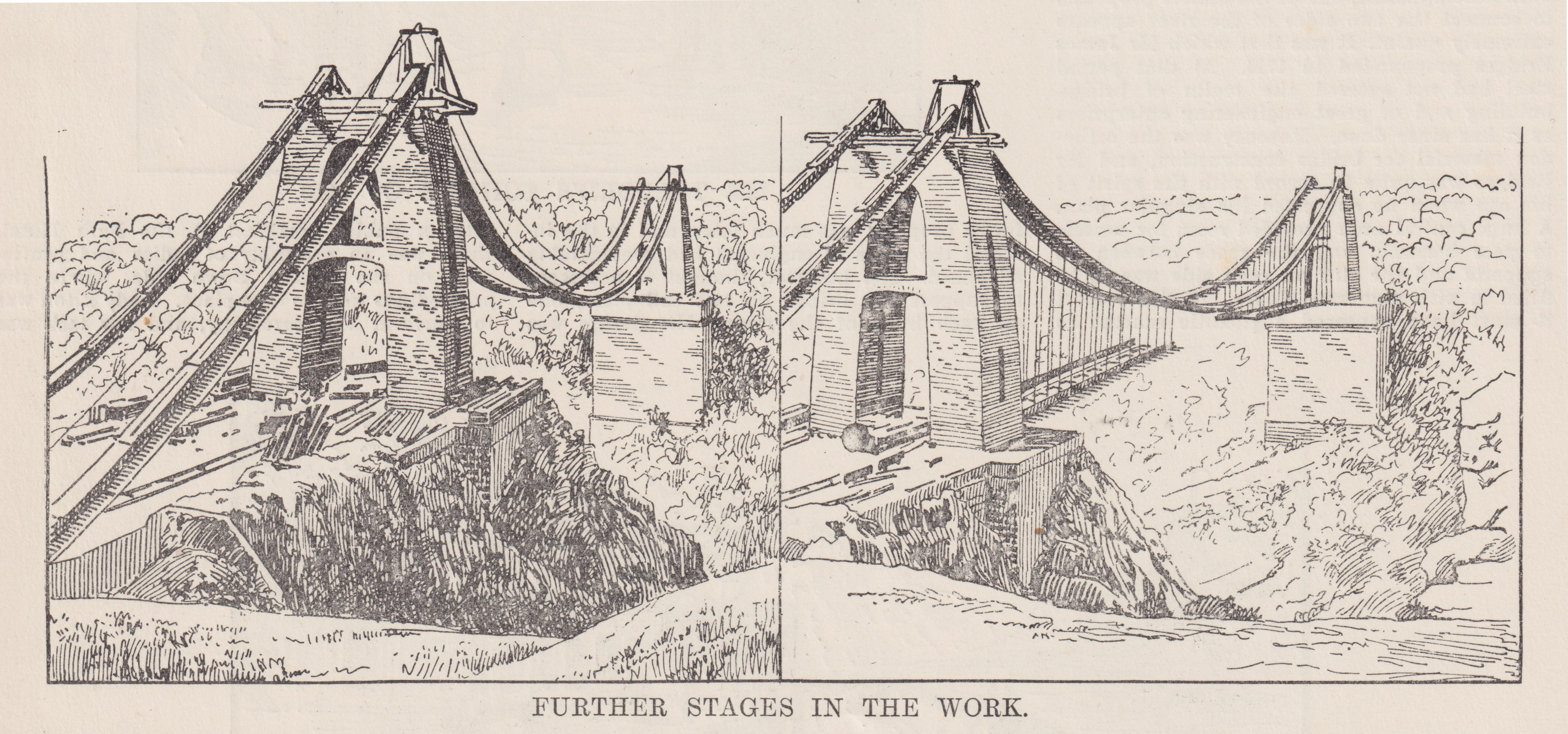
Clifton Suspension Bridge under construction c.1861

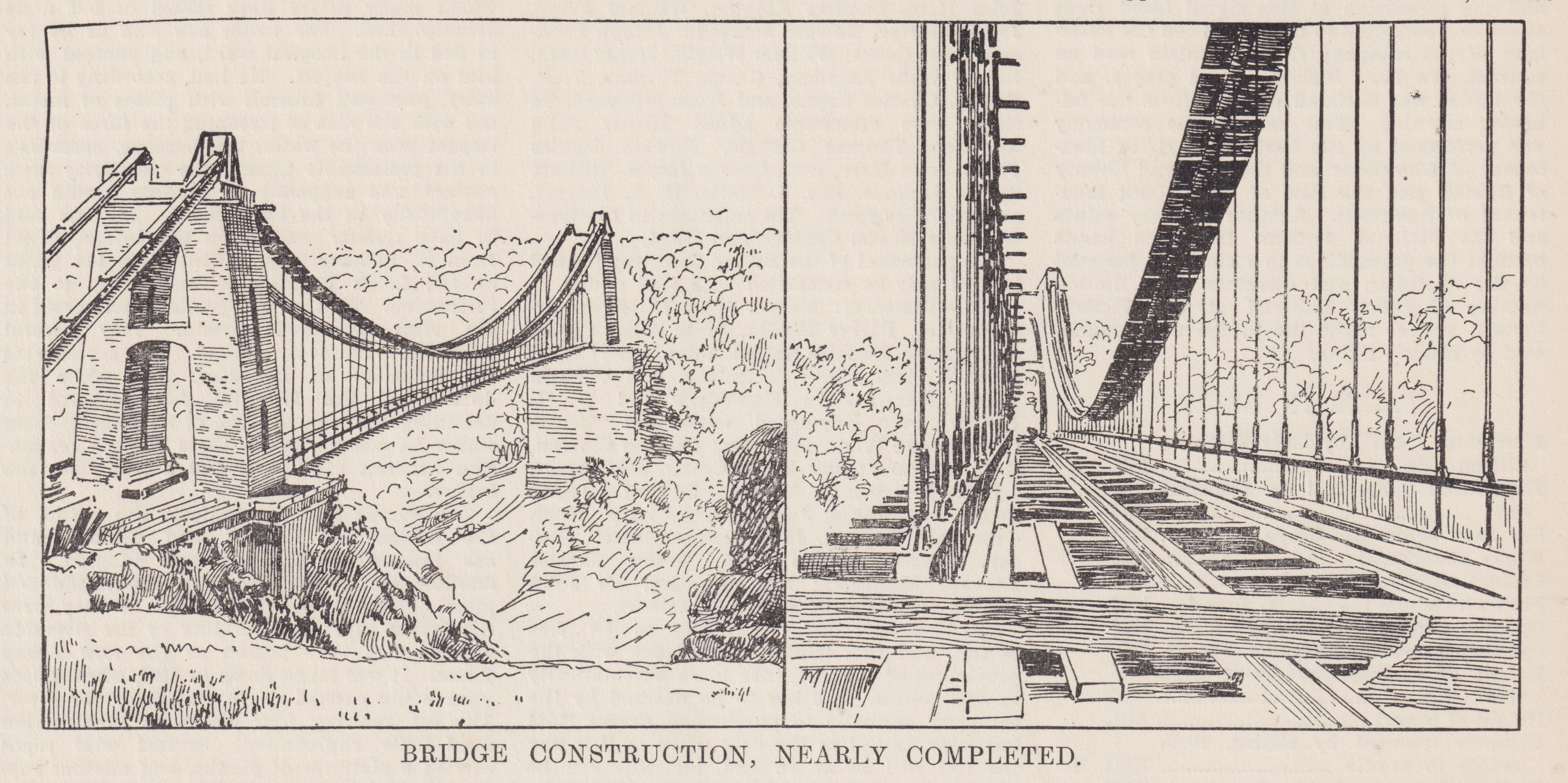
Clifton Suspension Bridge finishing construction c.1861

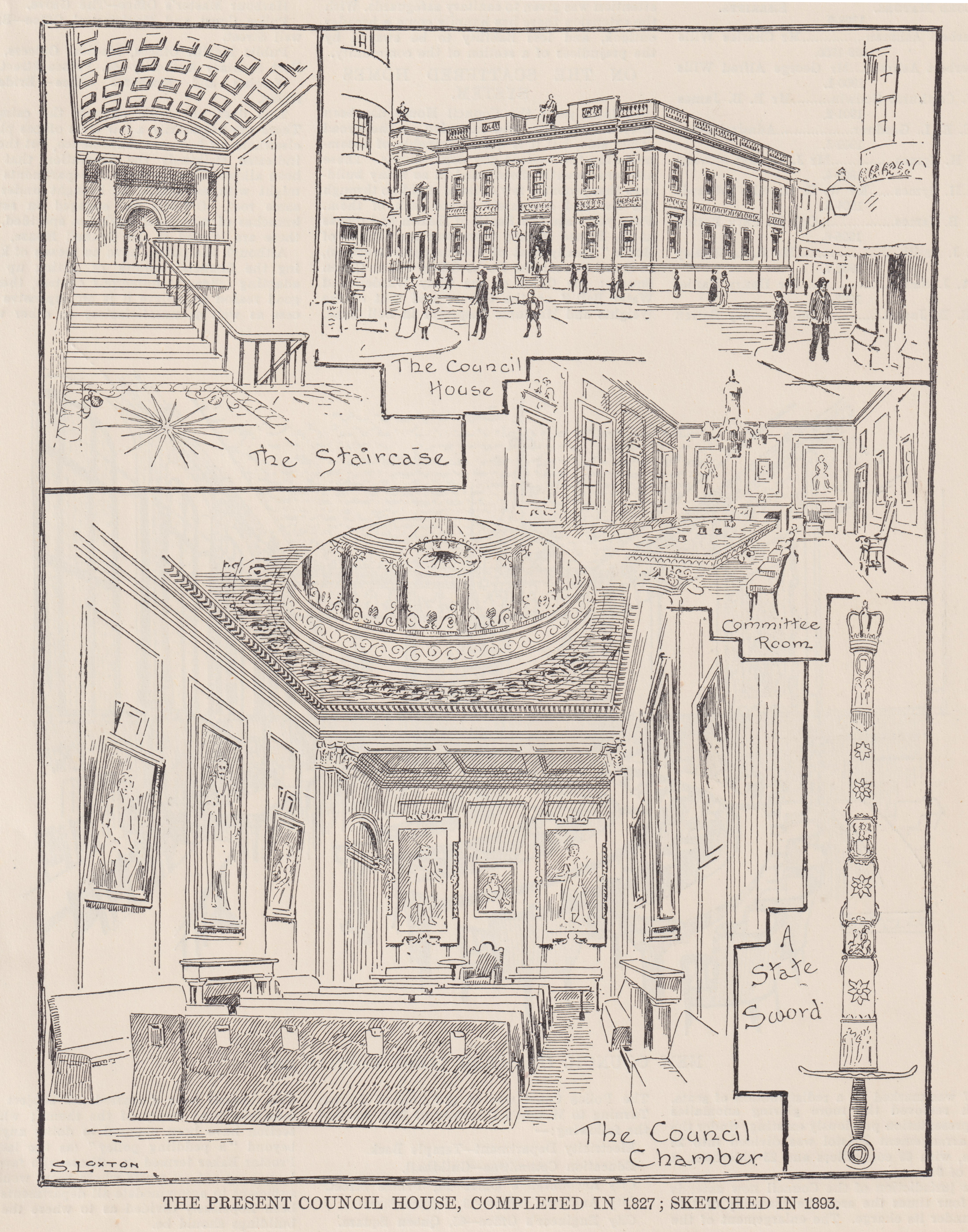
Newspaper illustration Council House, 1893

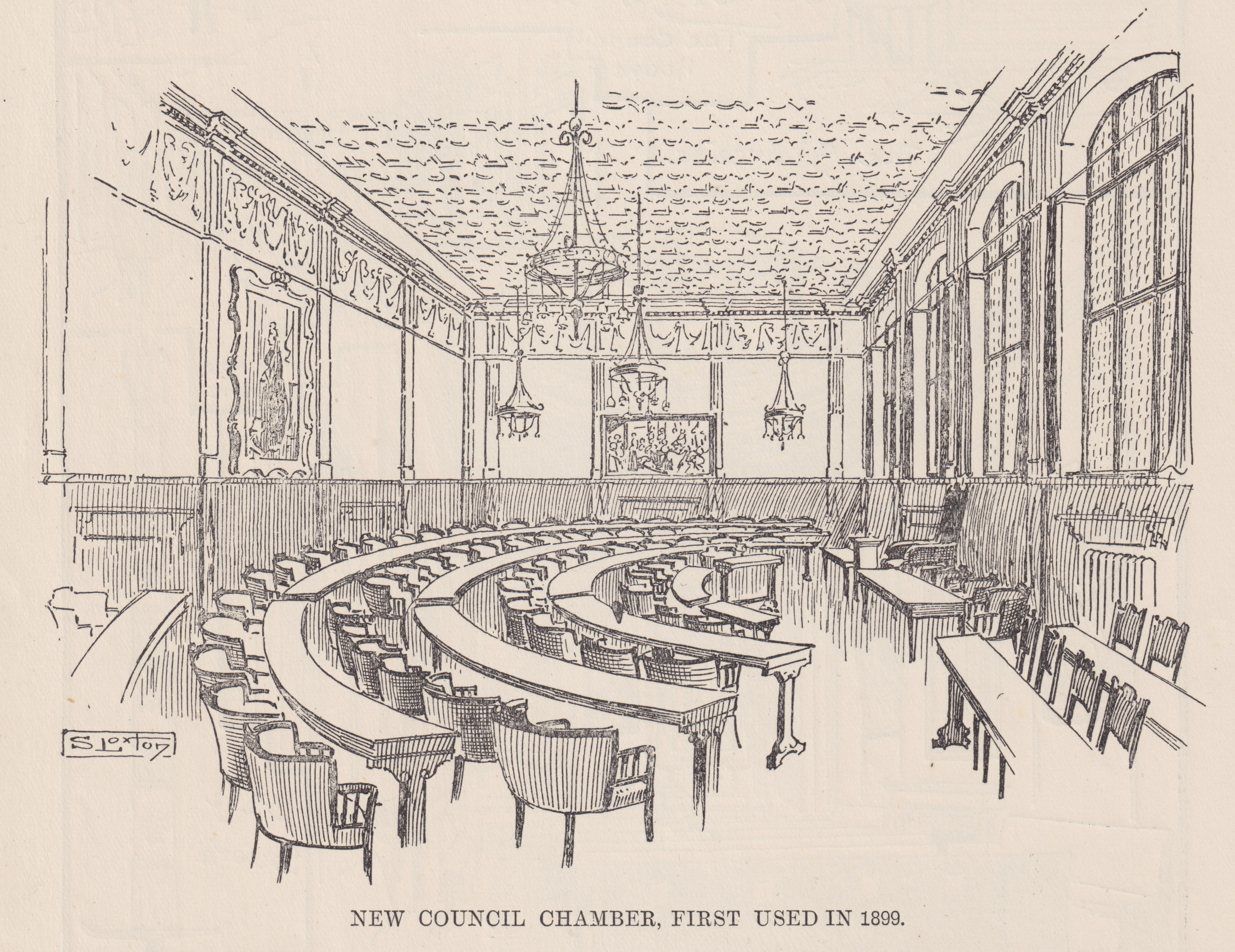
Bristol Council House Chamber 1899

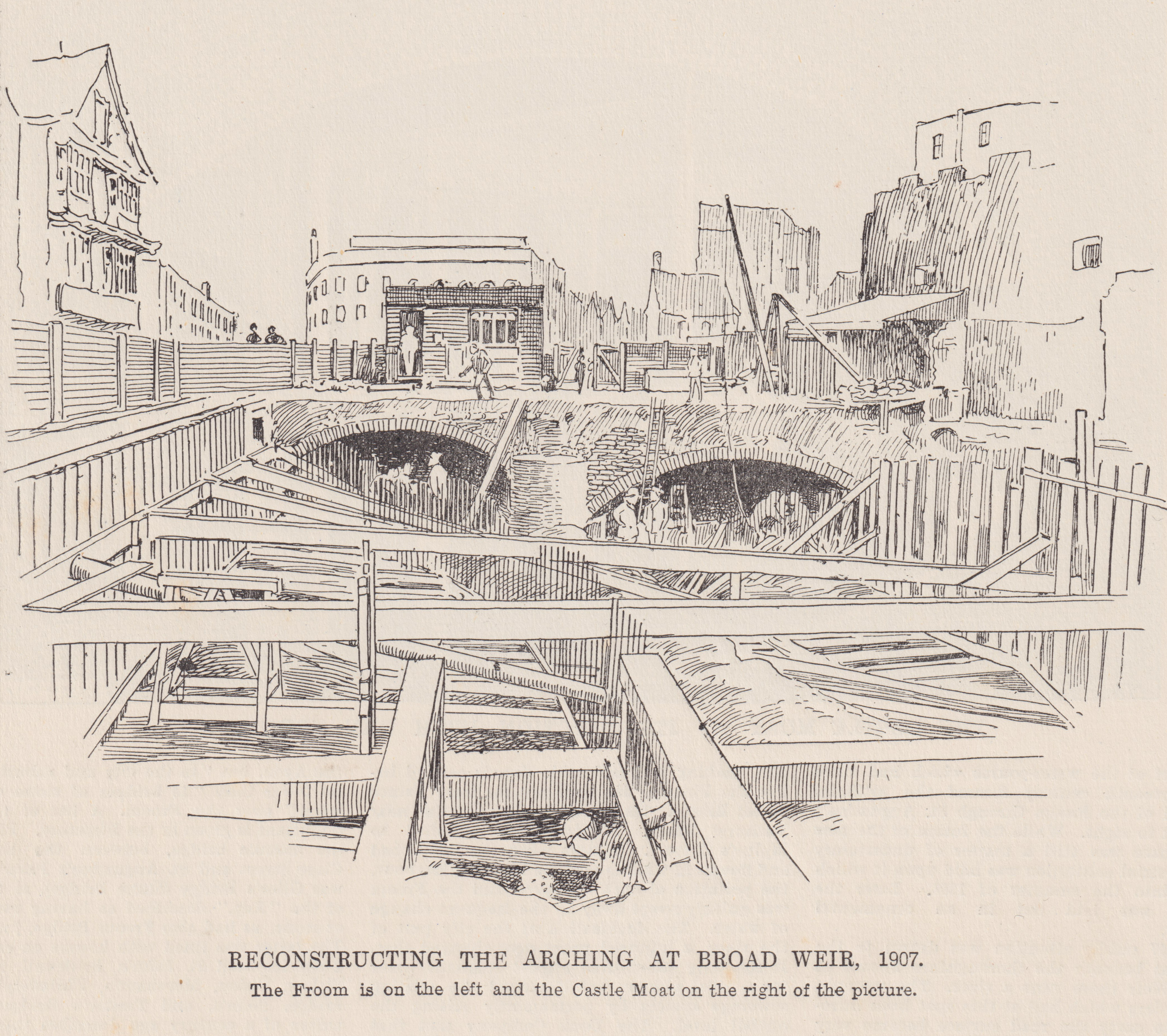
Arching Broad Weir 1907

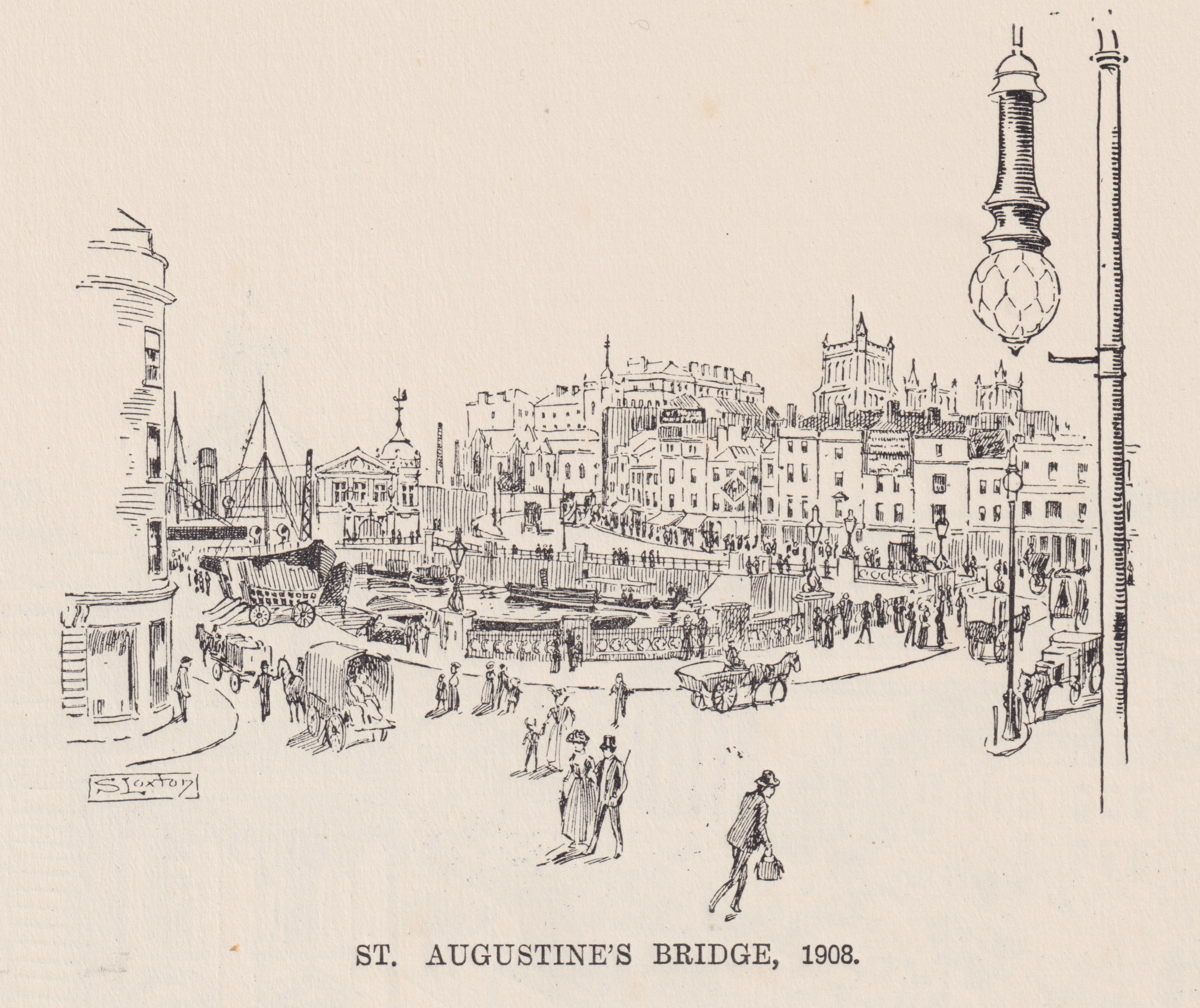
St Augustines Bridge 1908

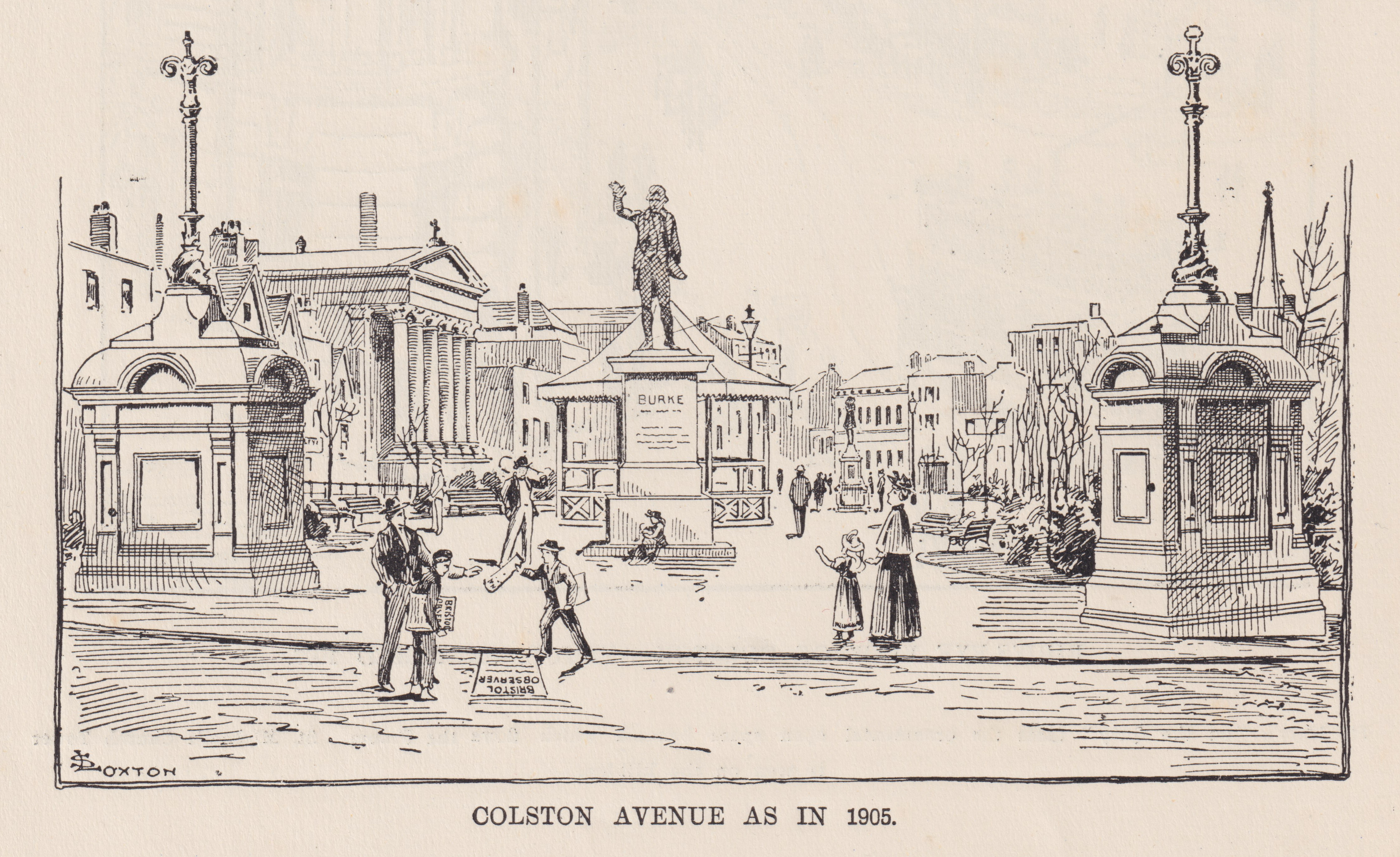
Colston Avenue 1905

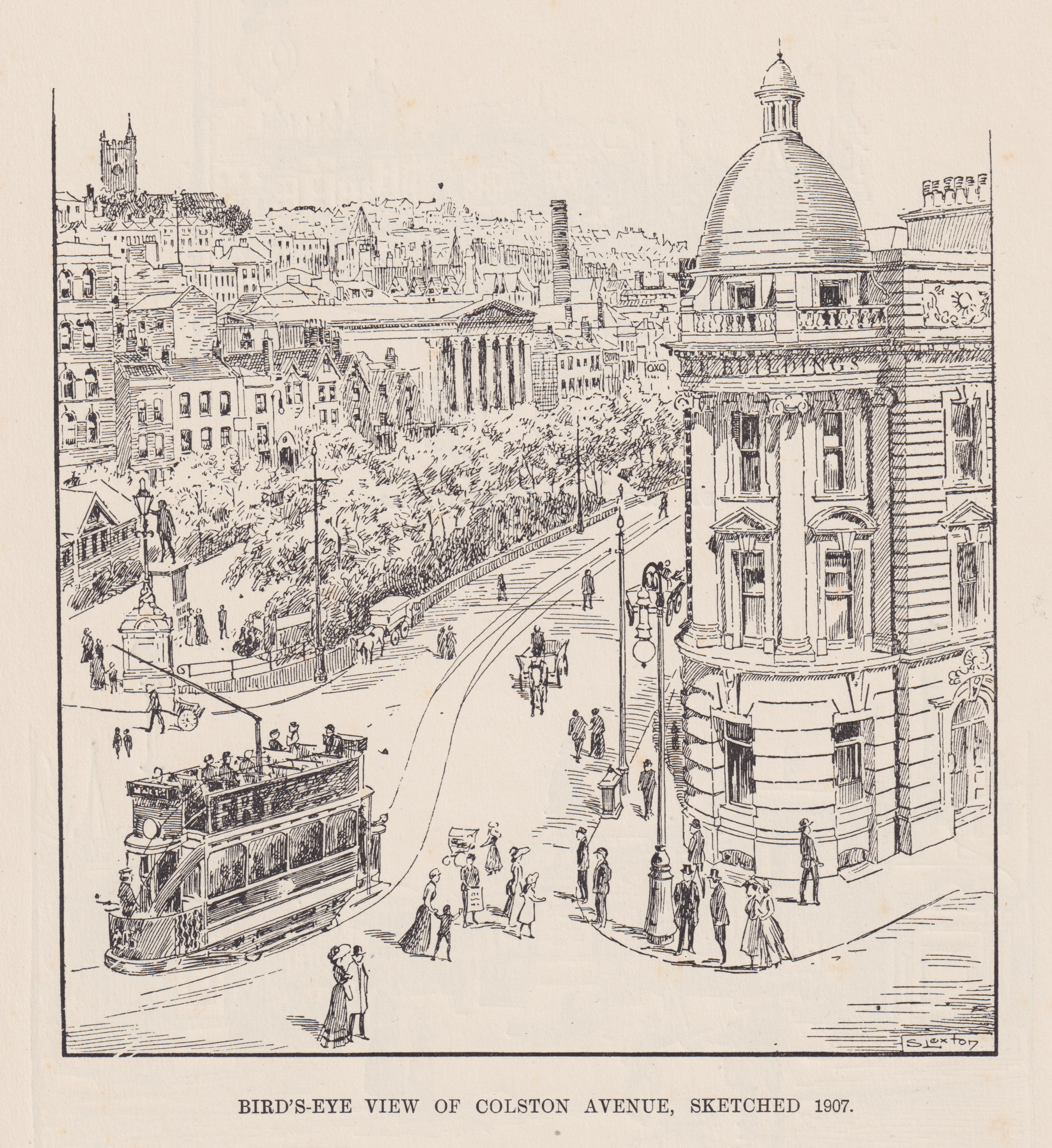
Colston Avenue, Bristol 1907

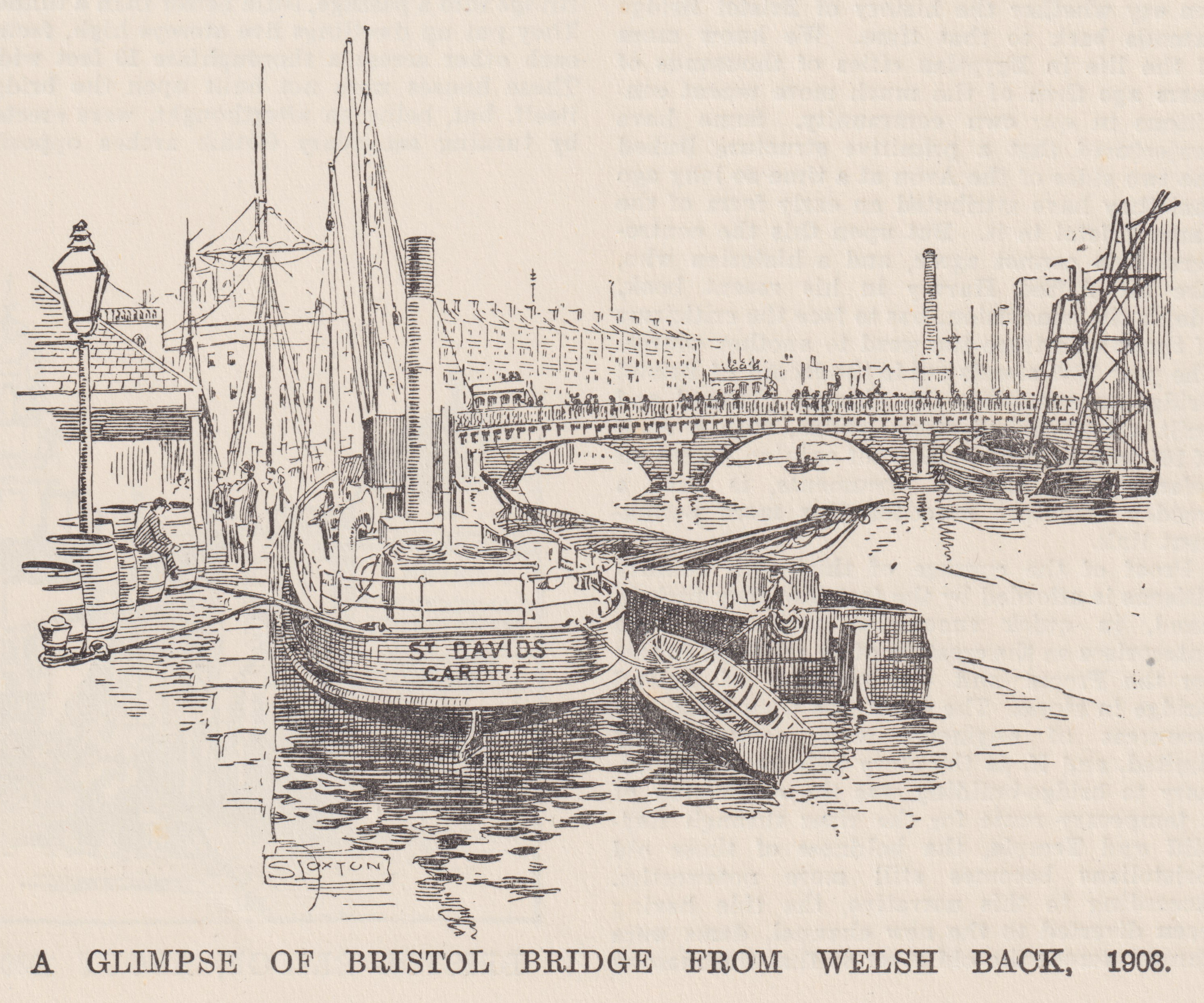
Bristol Bridge from Welsh Back 1908

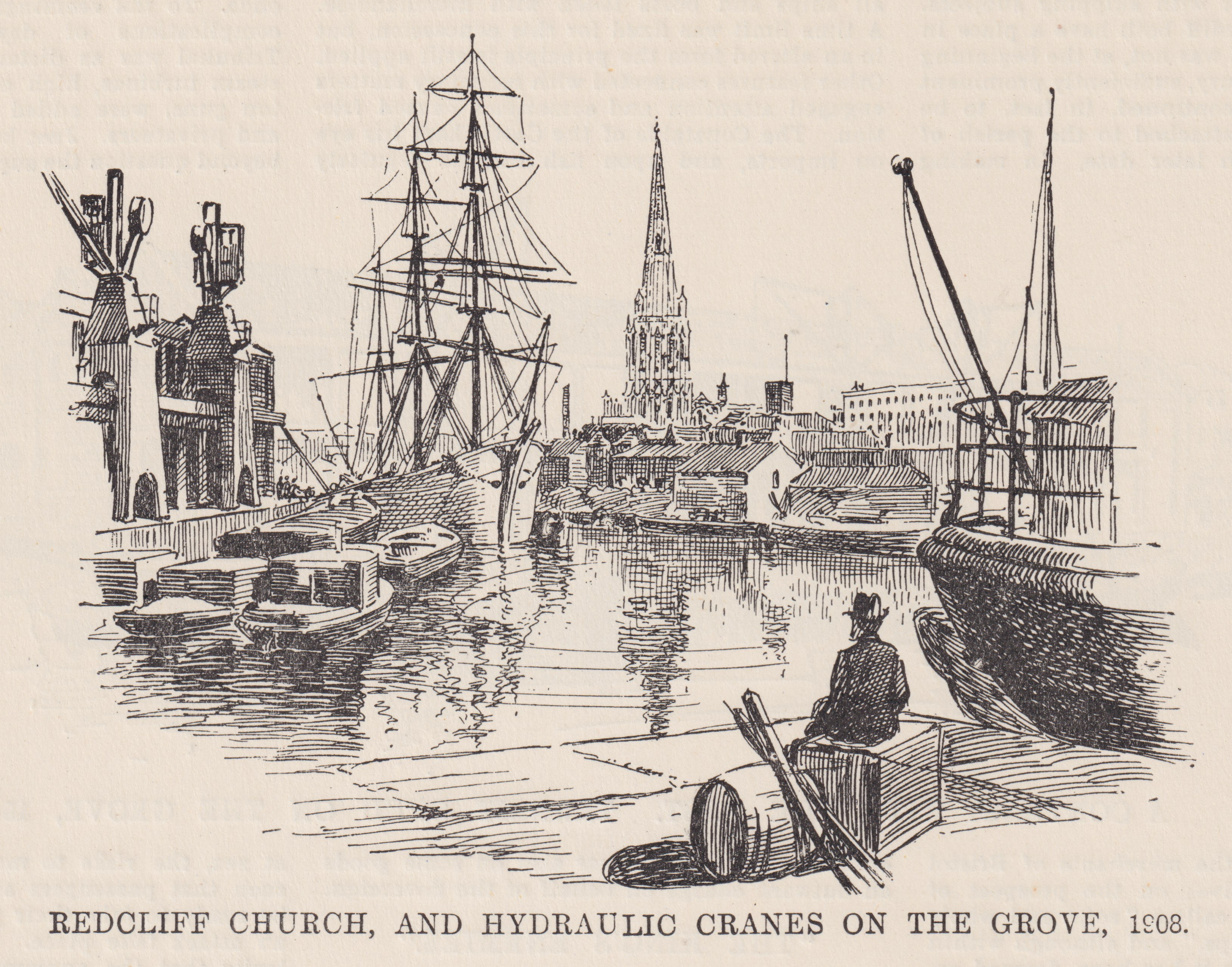
Redcliffe Church and cranes 1908

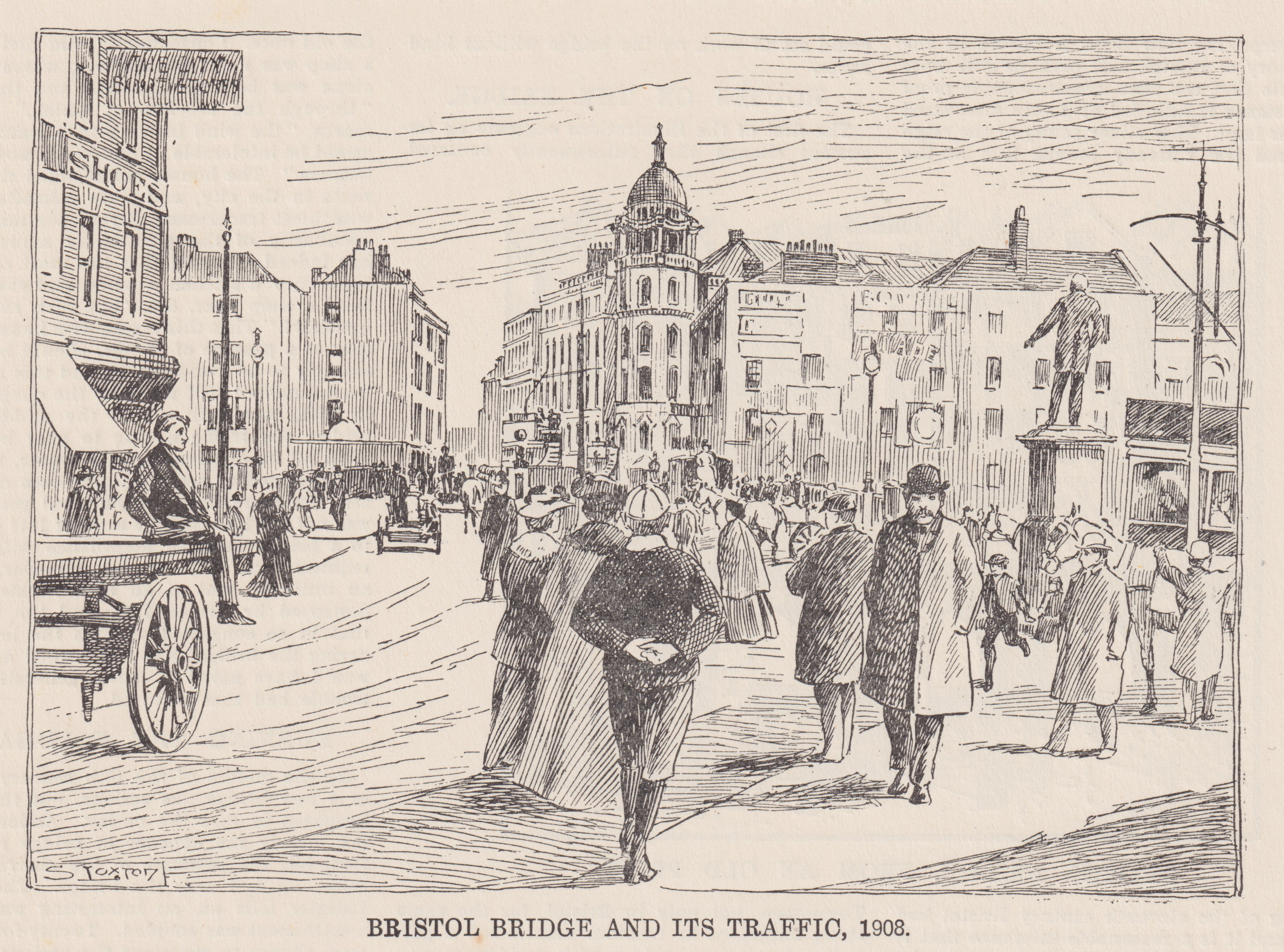
Bristol Bridge traffic 1908

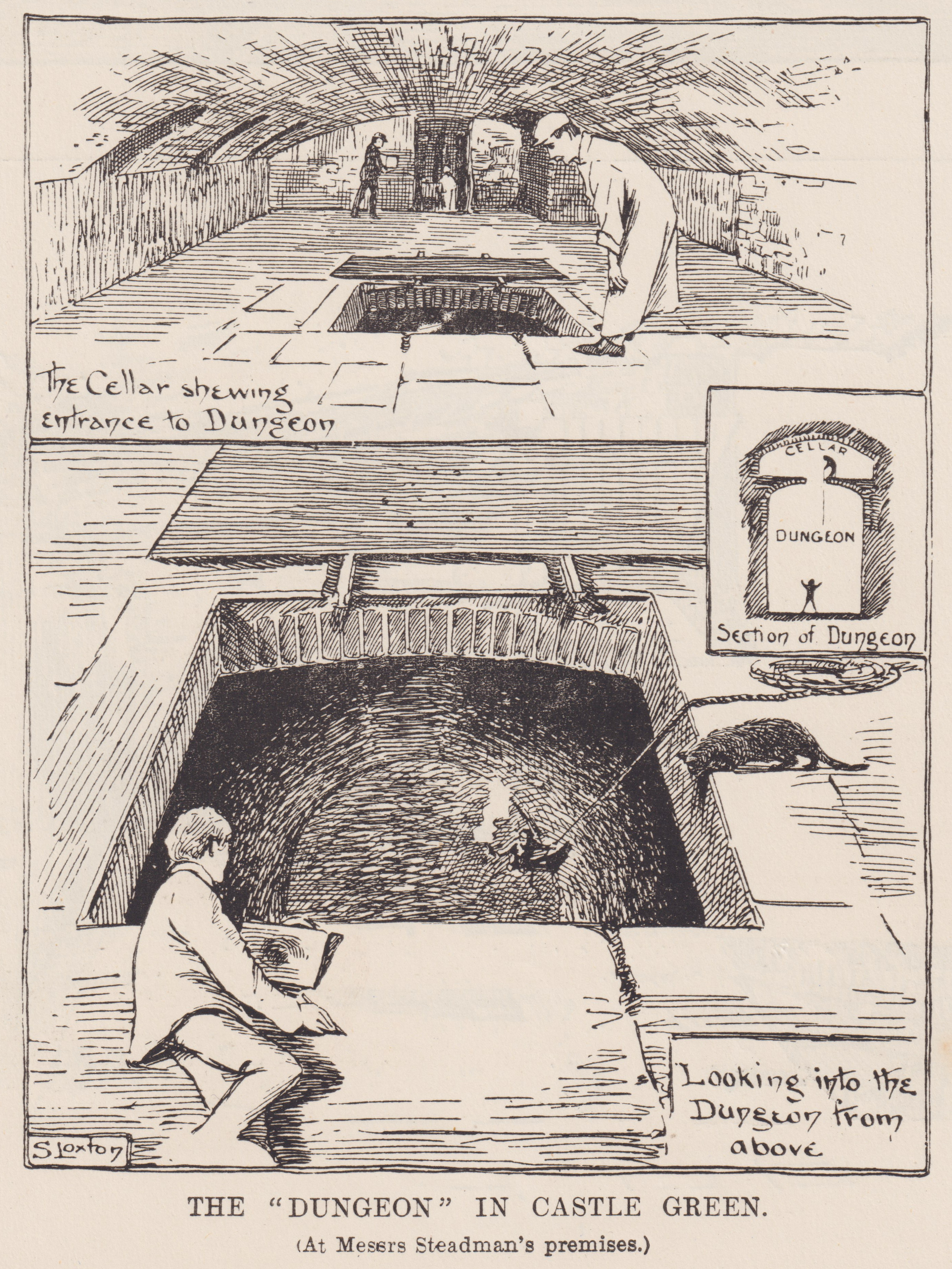
The 'Dungeon' at Bristol Castle

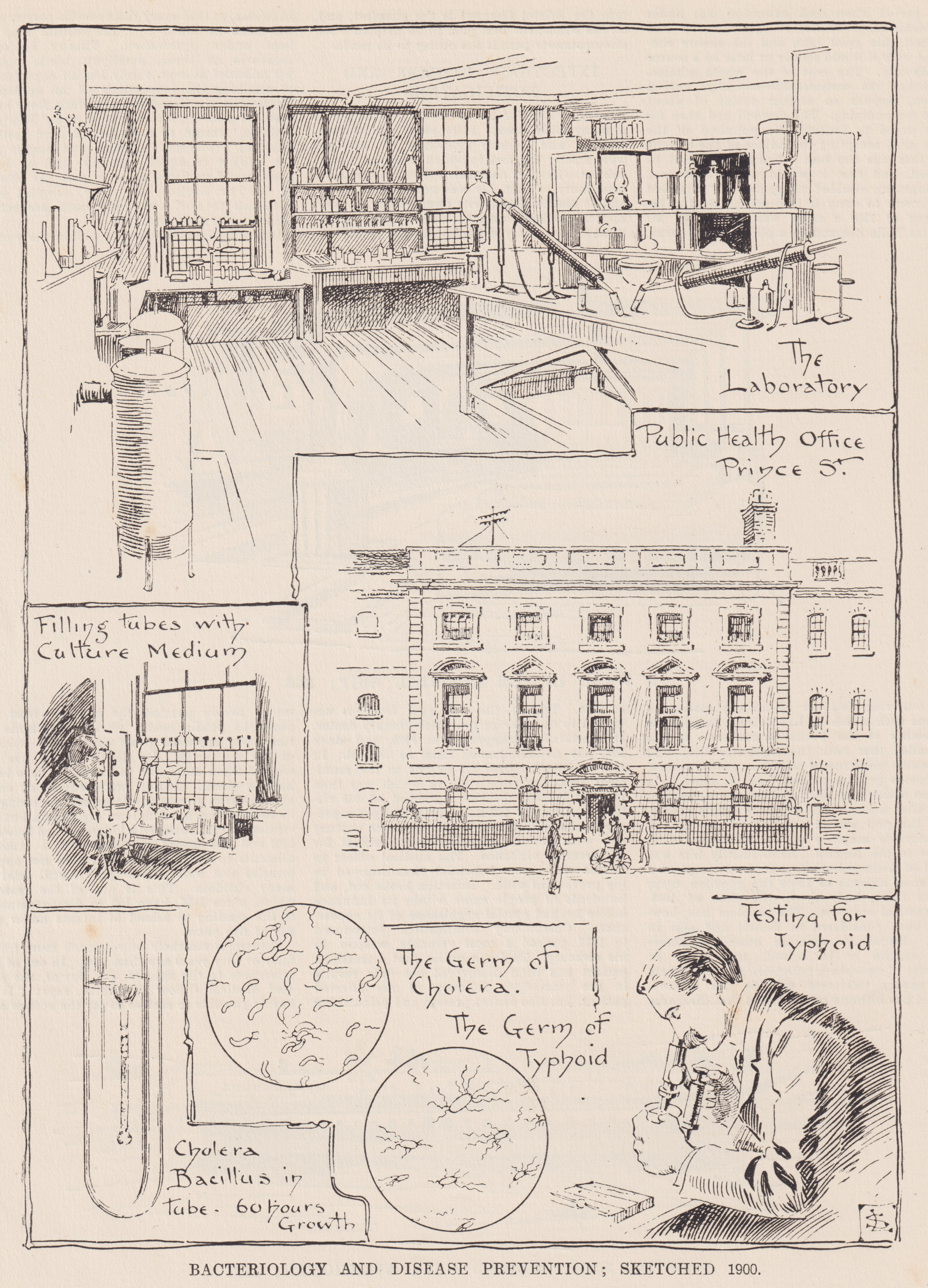
Disease prevention in Bristol, newspaper illustration, 1900

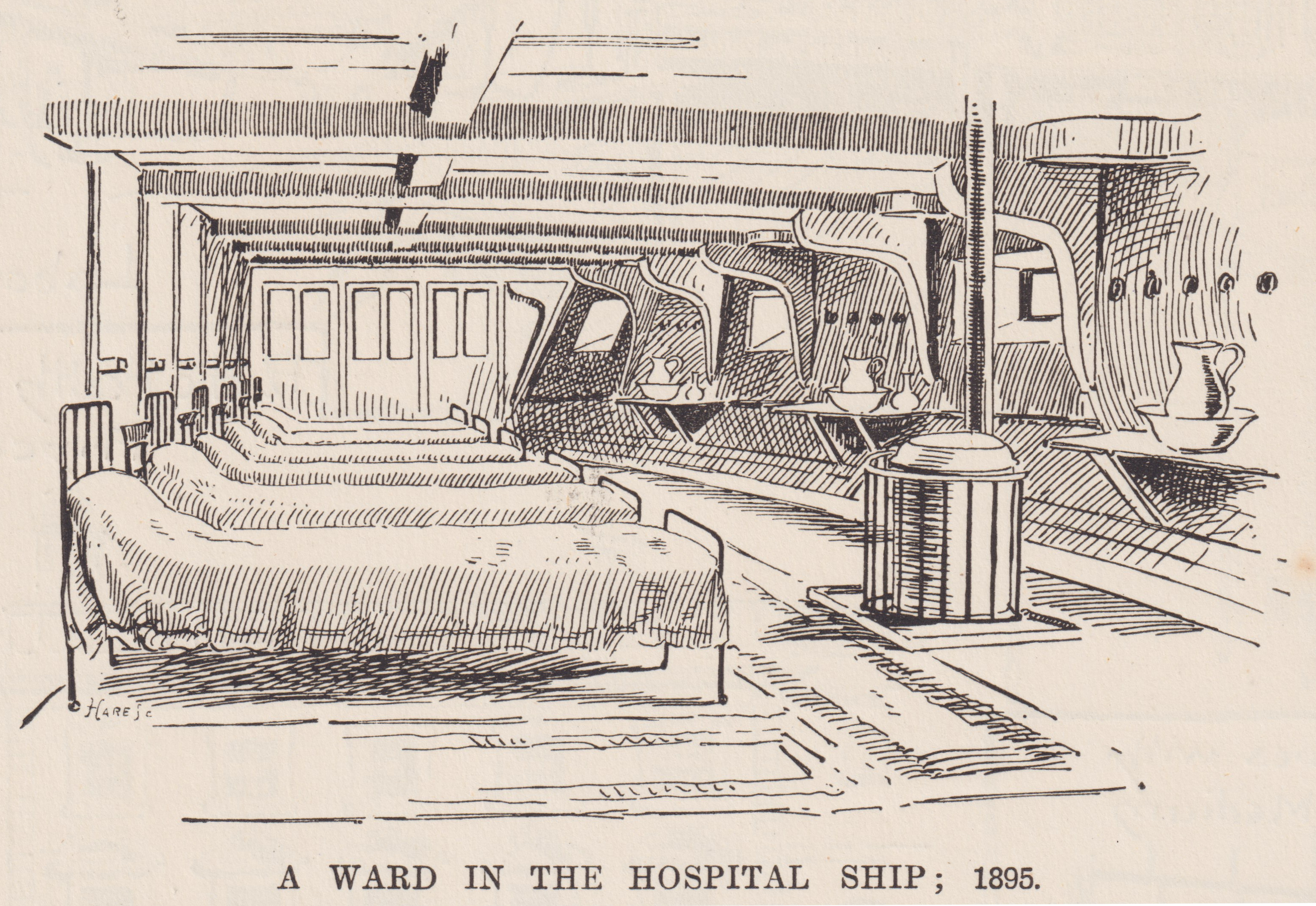
Avonmouth Hospital Ship ward 1895

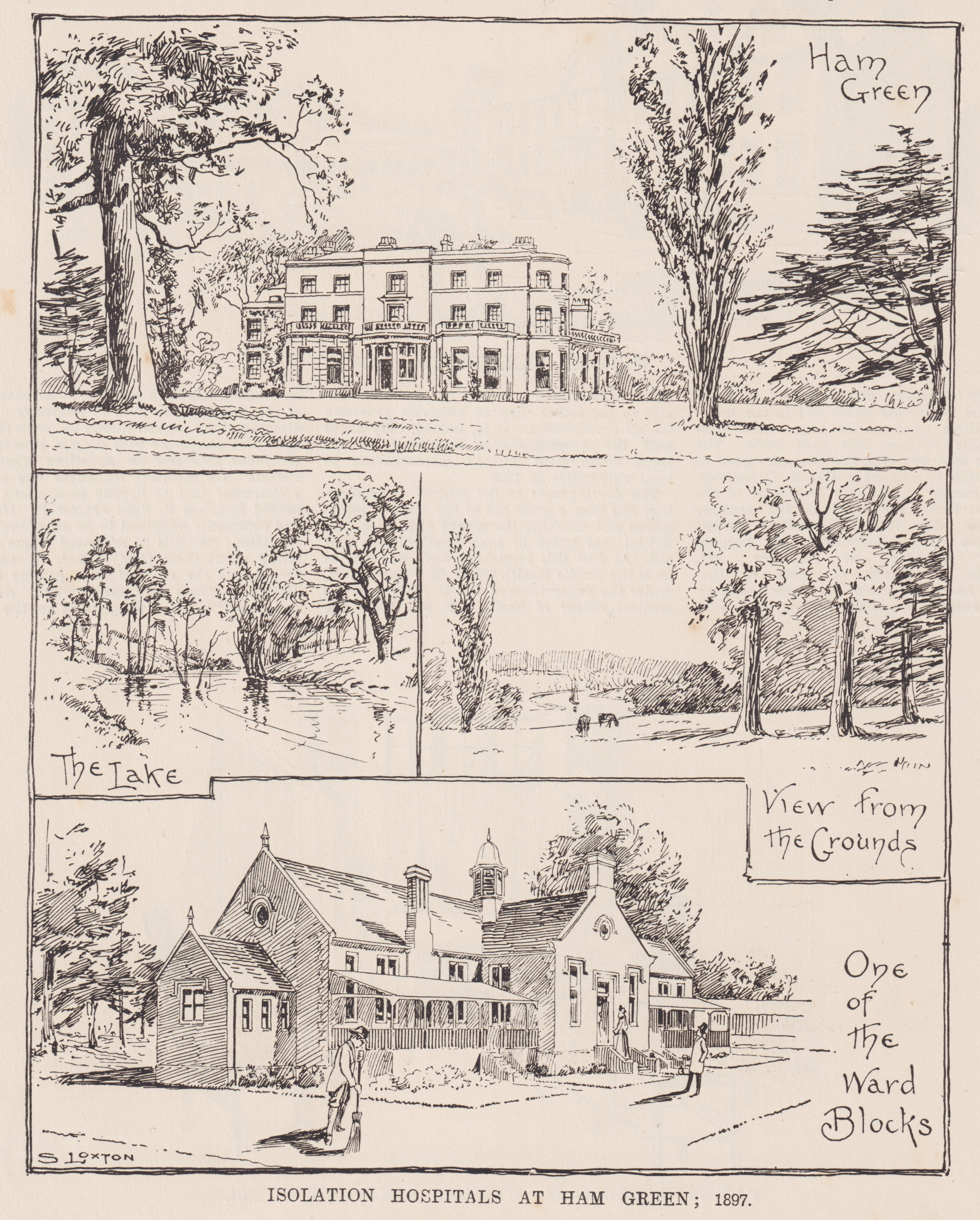
Ham Green Isolation Hospitals, 1897

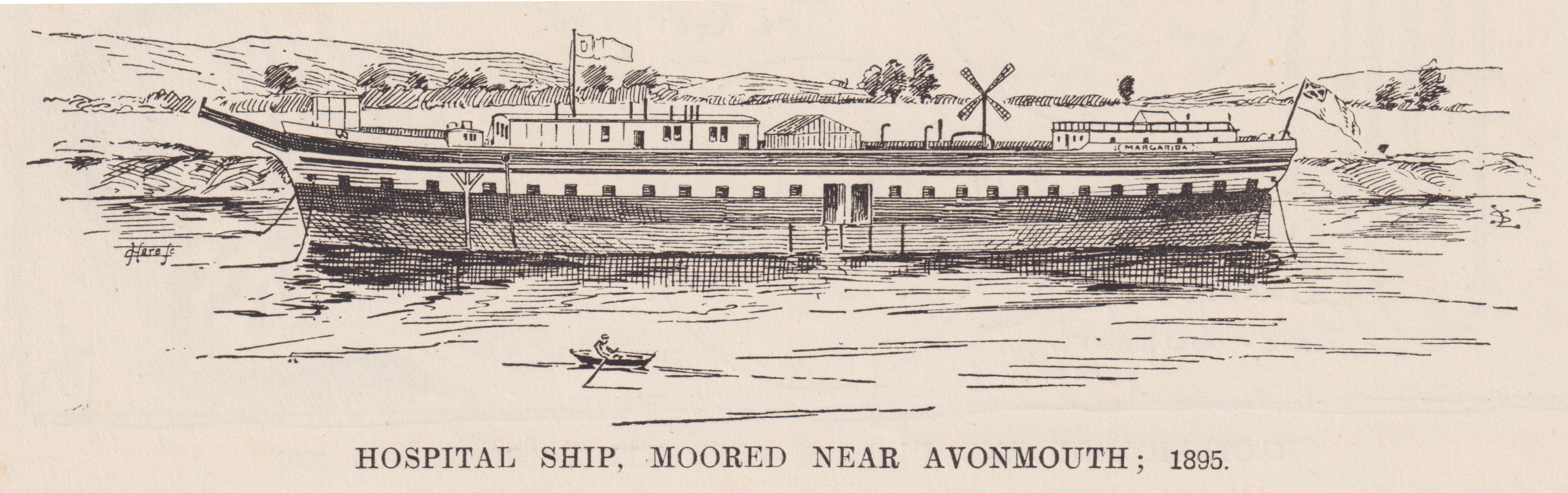
Hospital Ship Avonmouth 1895

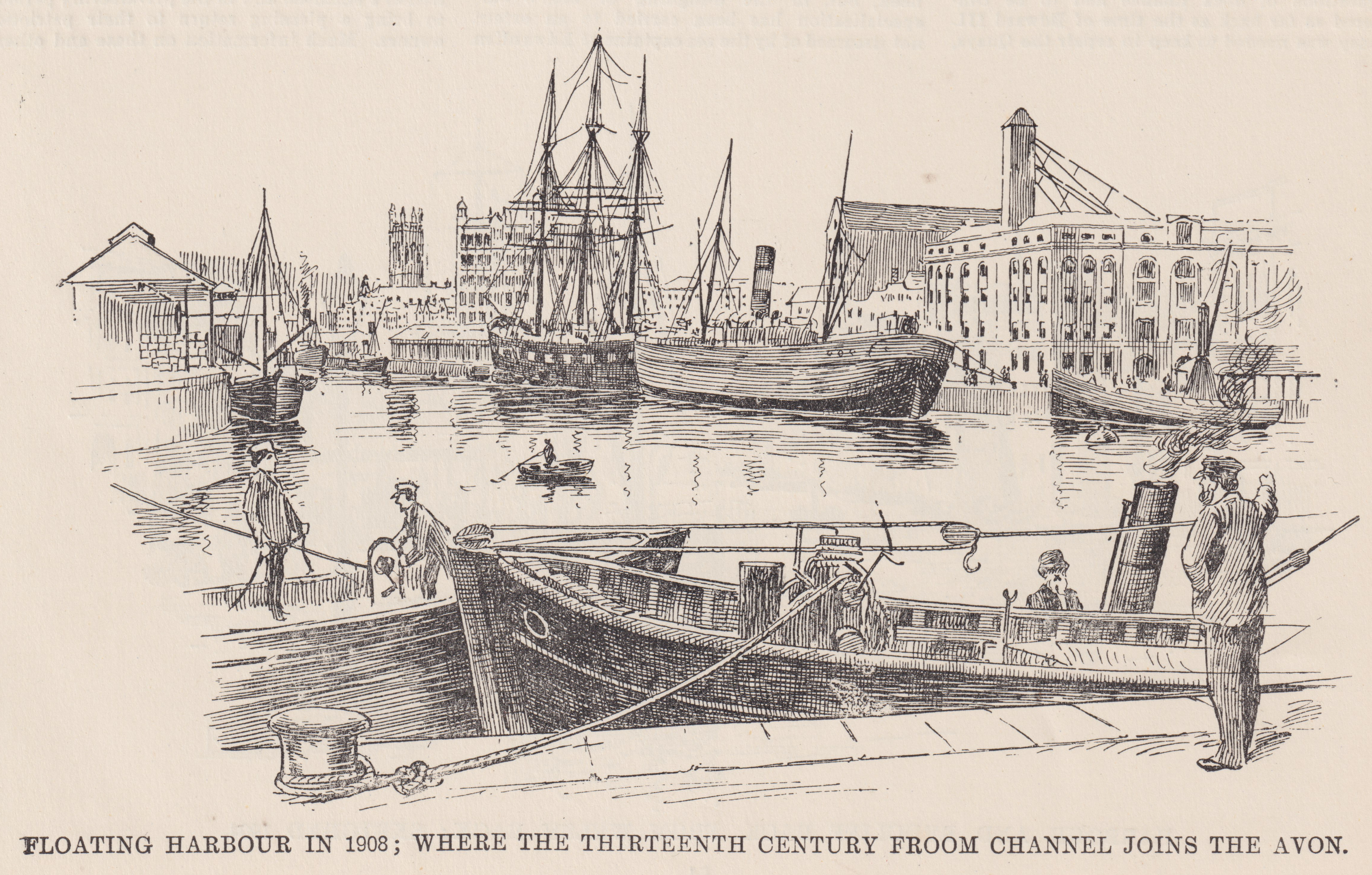
Floating Harbour, Bristol, Frome 1908

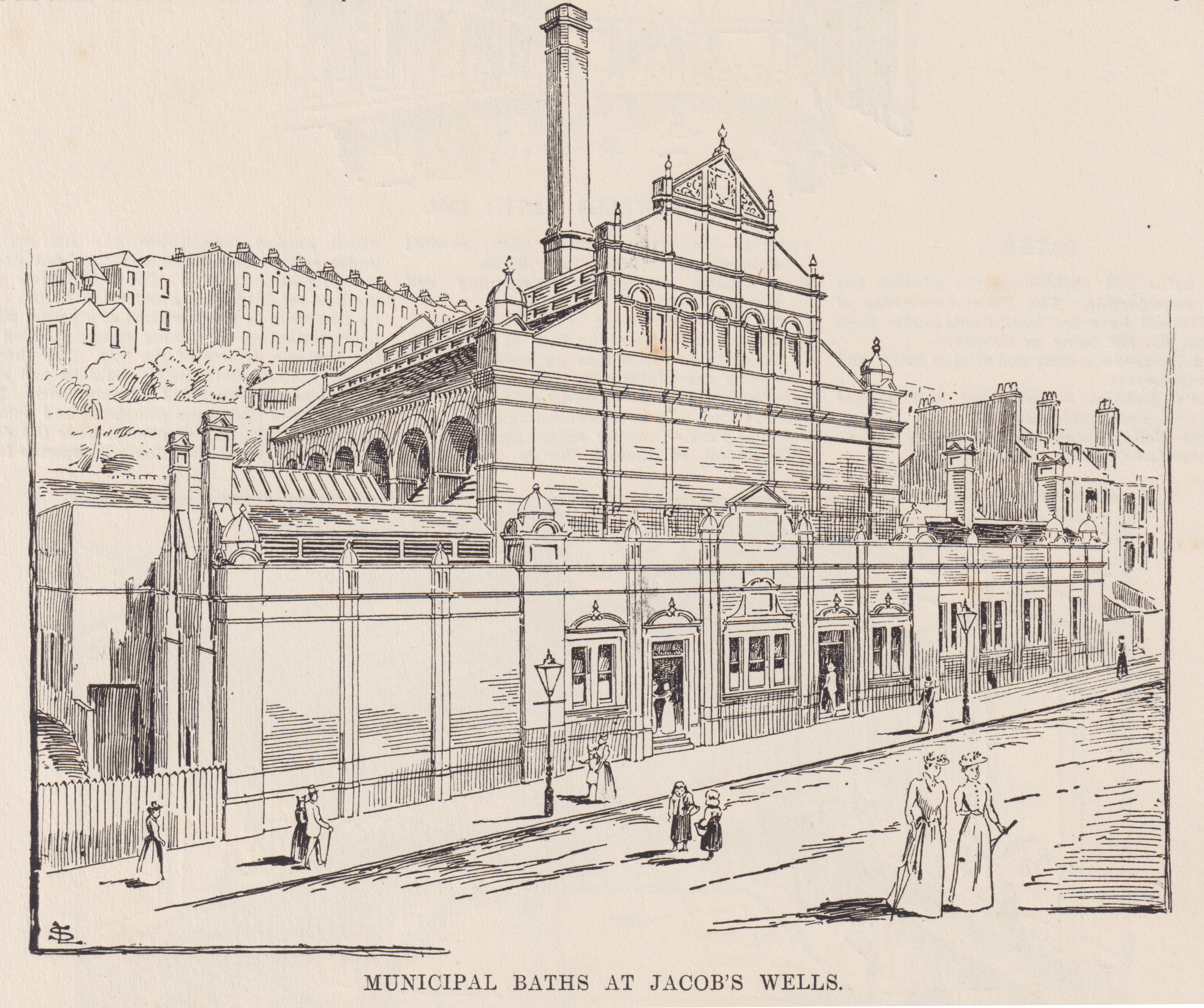
Jacobs Wells baths 1904

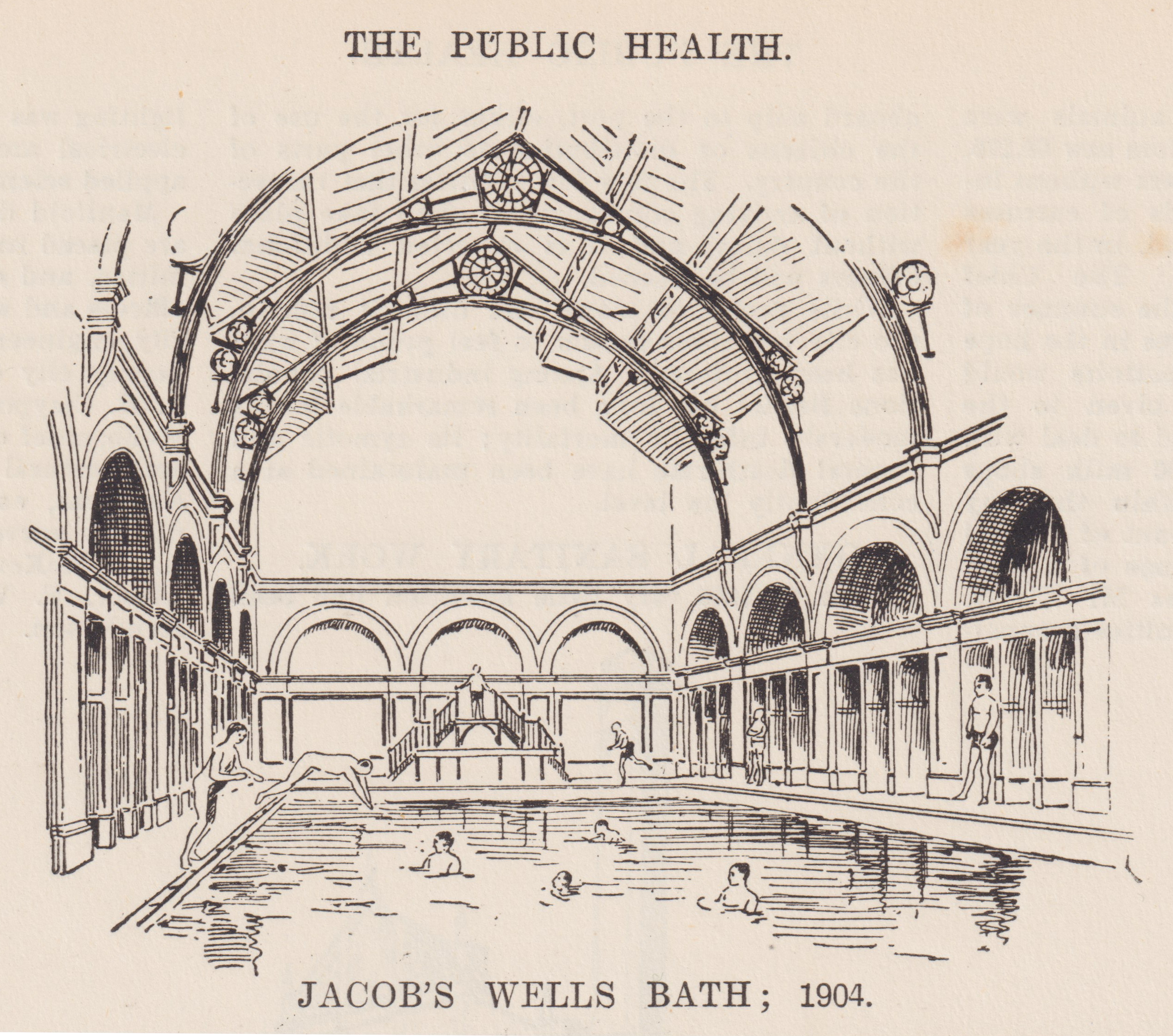
Jacobs Wells baths interior 1904

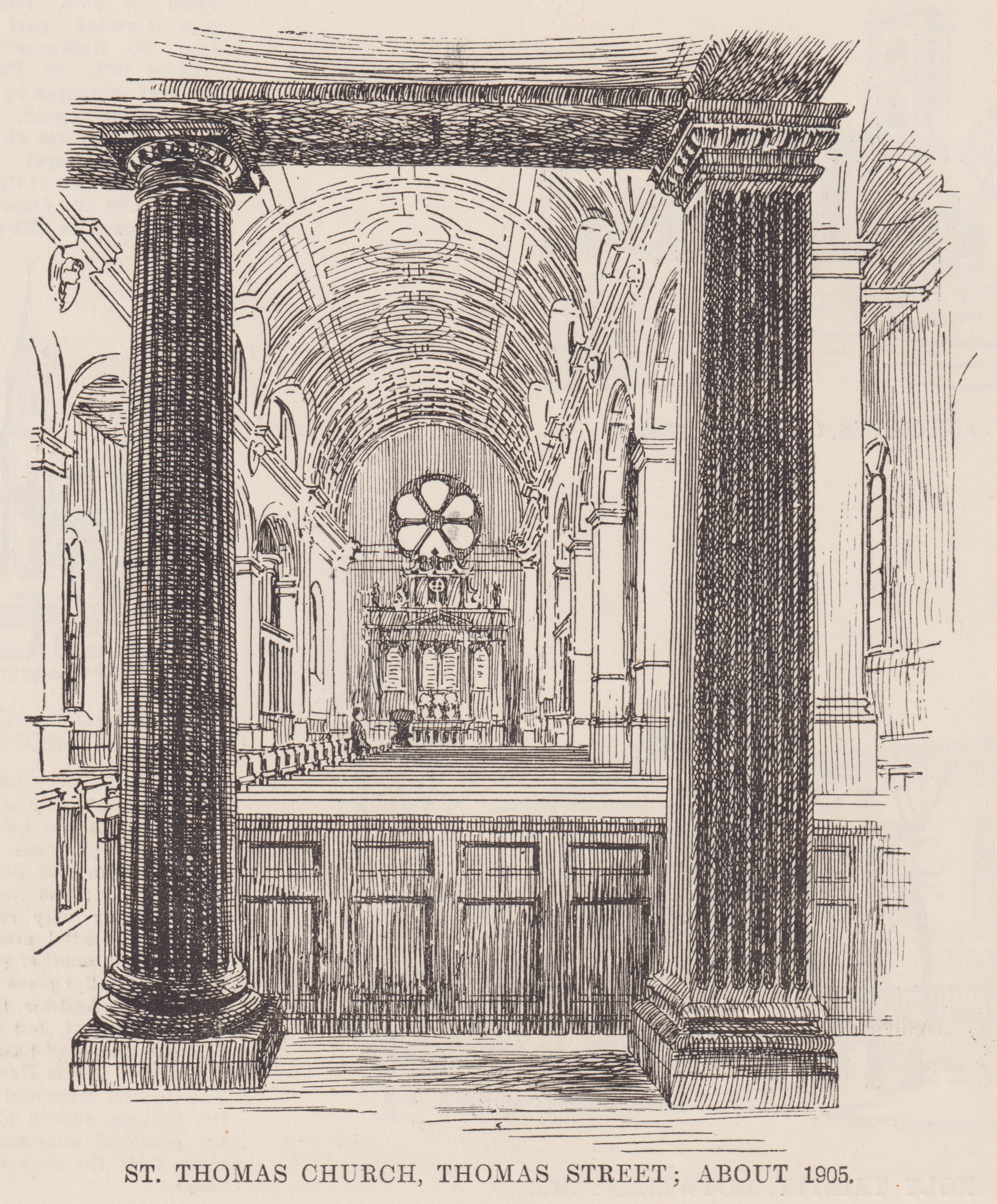
St Thomas church, Bristol interior 1905

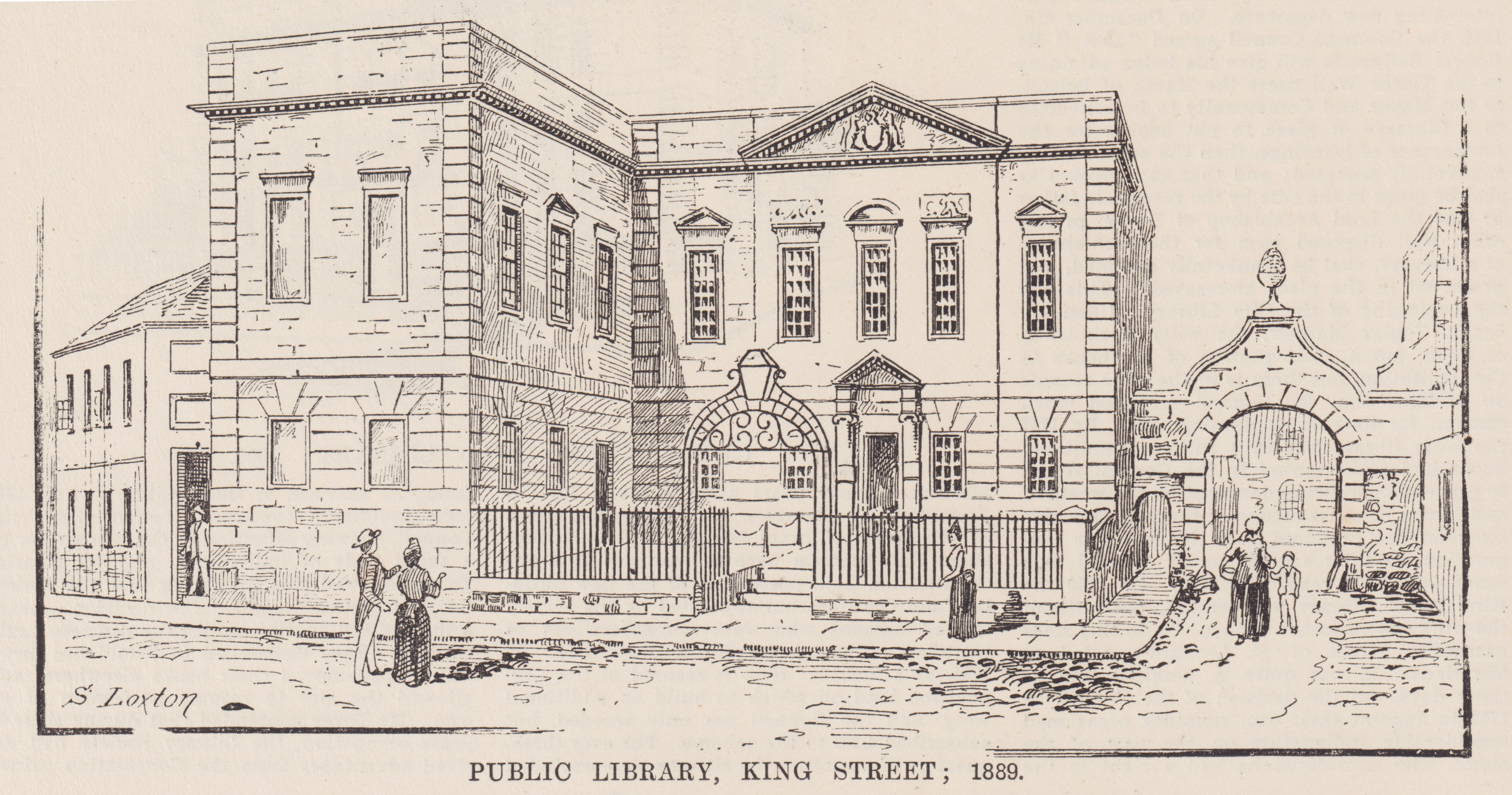
Bristol public library 1889

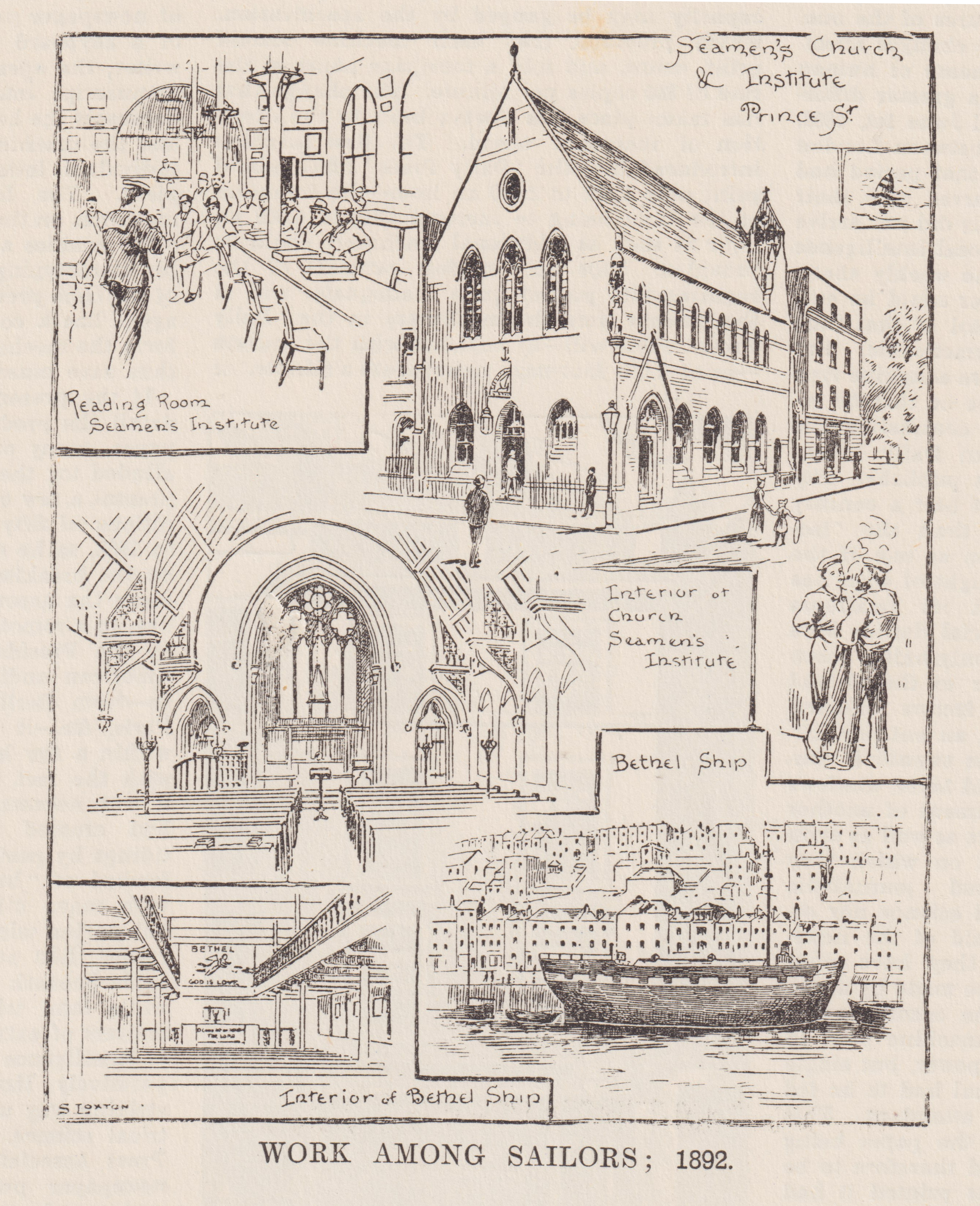
Charity work among sailors Bristol 1892

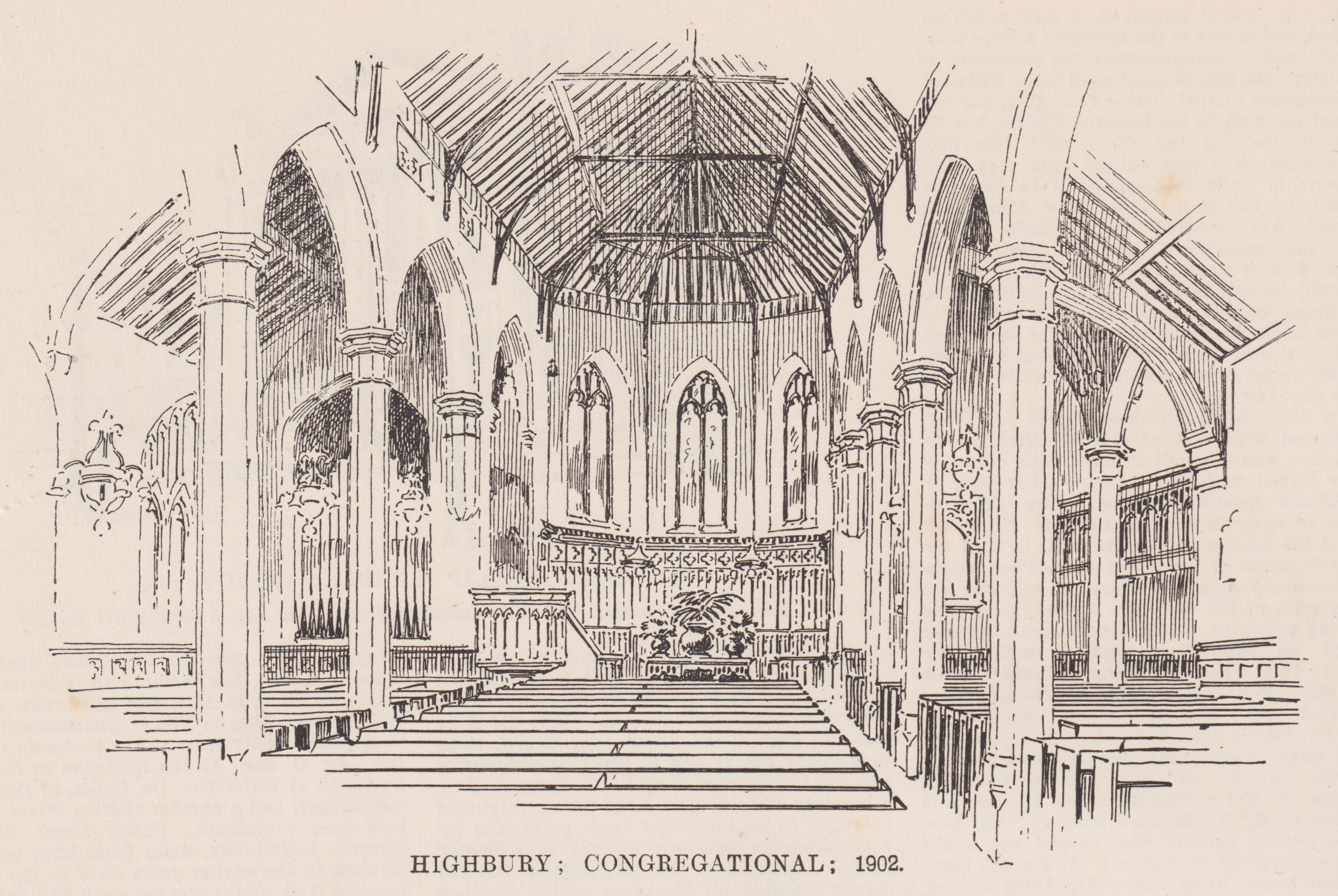
Highbury Chapel interior 1902

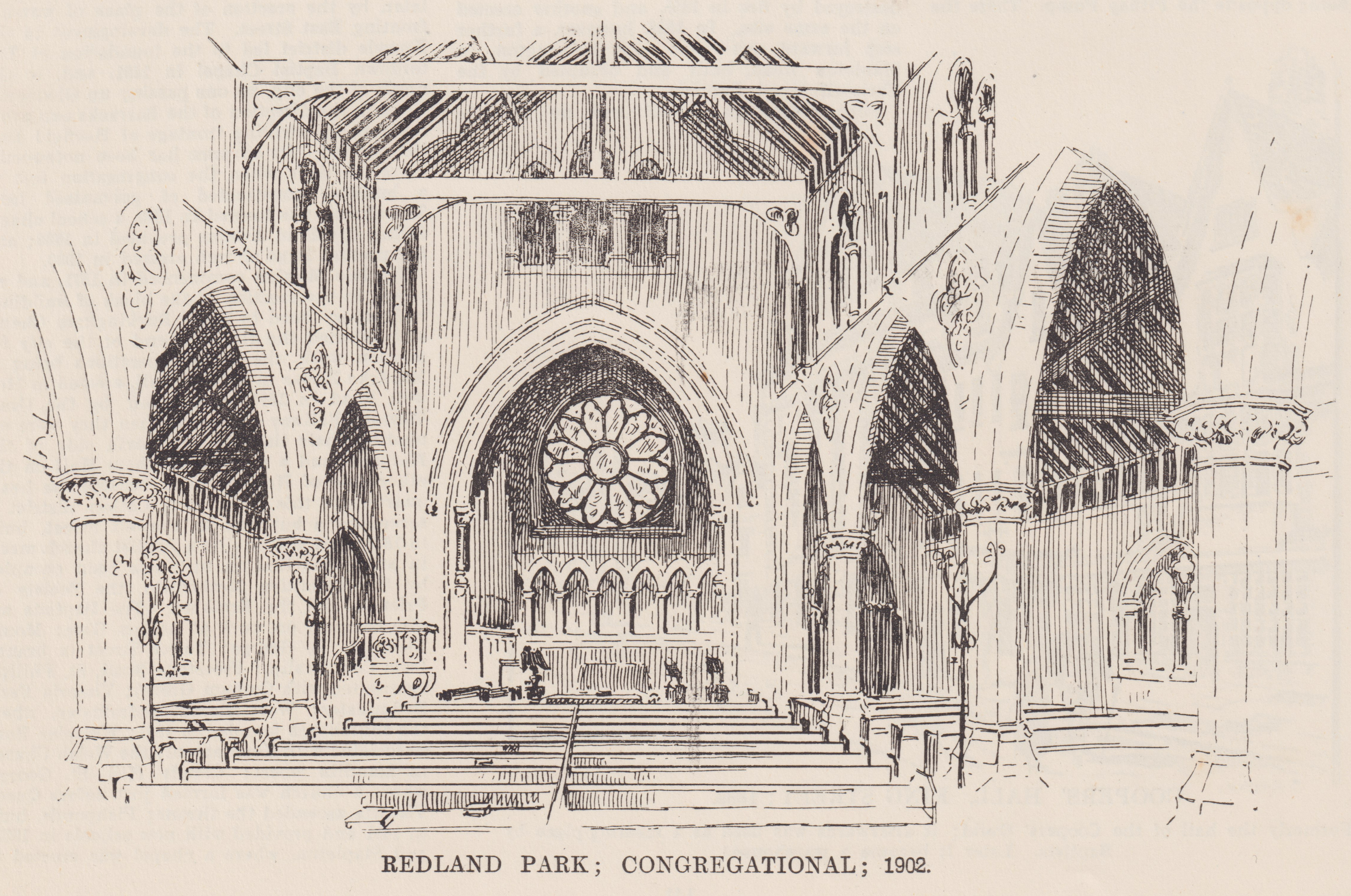
Redland Park congregational chapel interior 1902

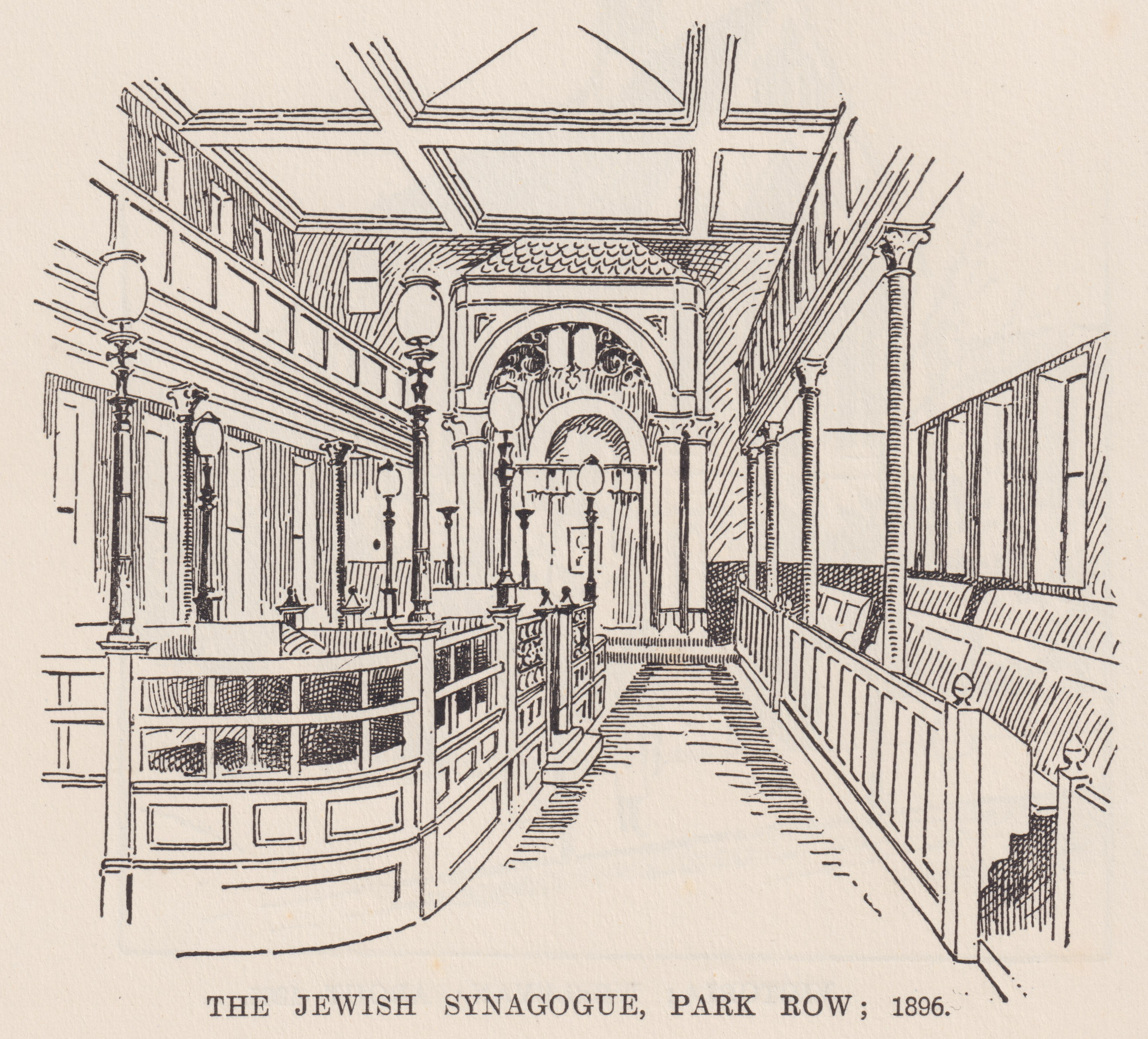
Synagogue interior, Park Row, Bristol, 1896

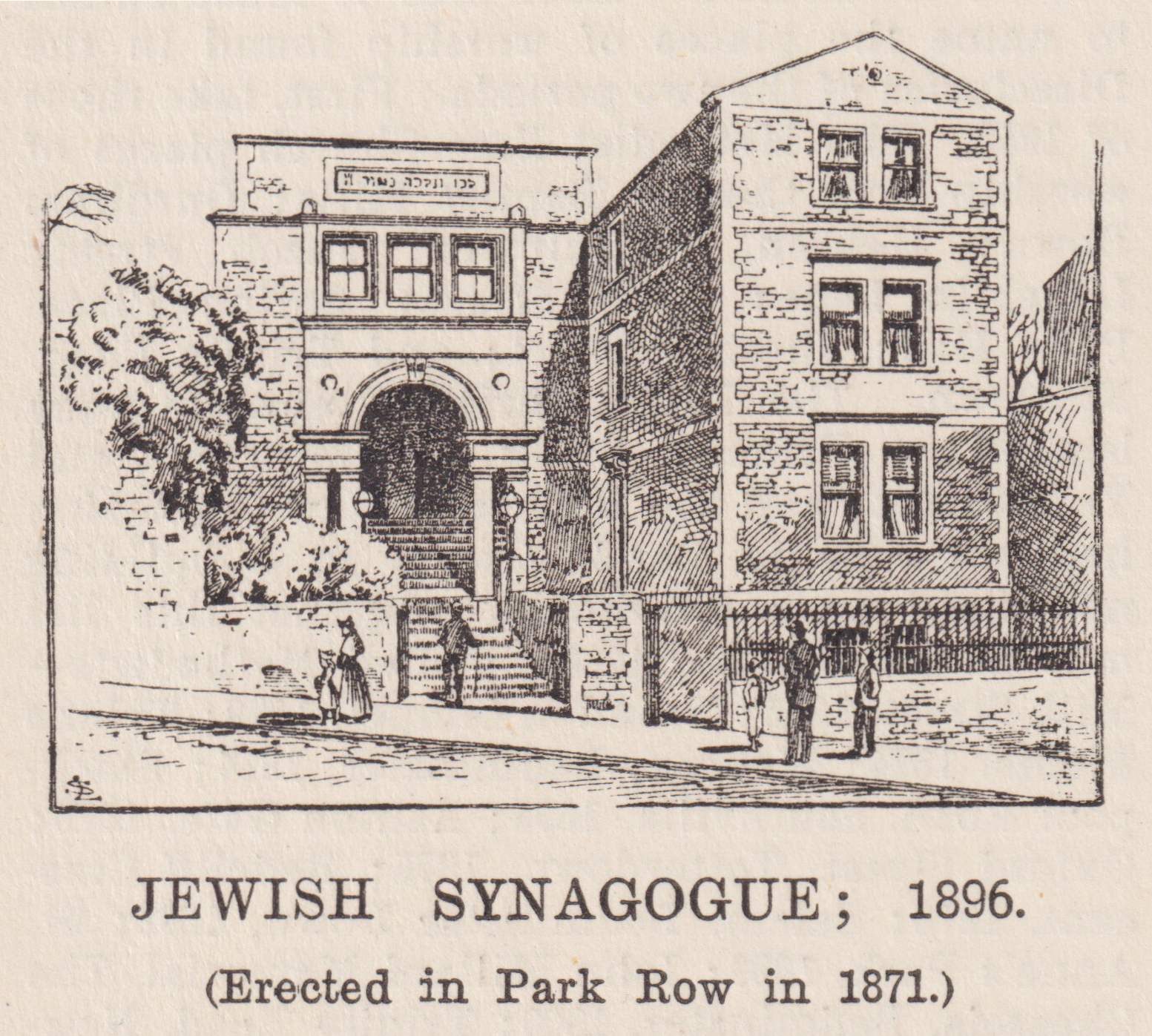
Synagogue, Park Row, Bristol, 1896

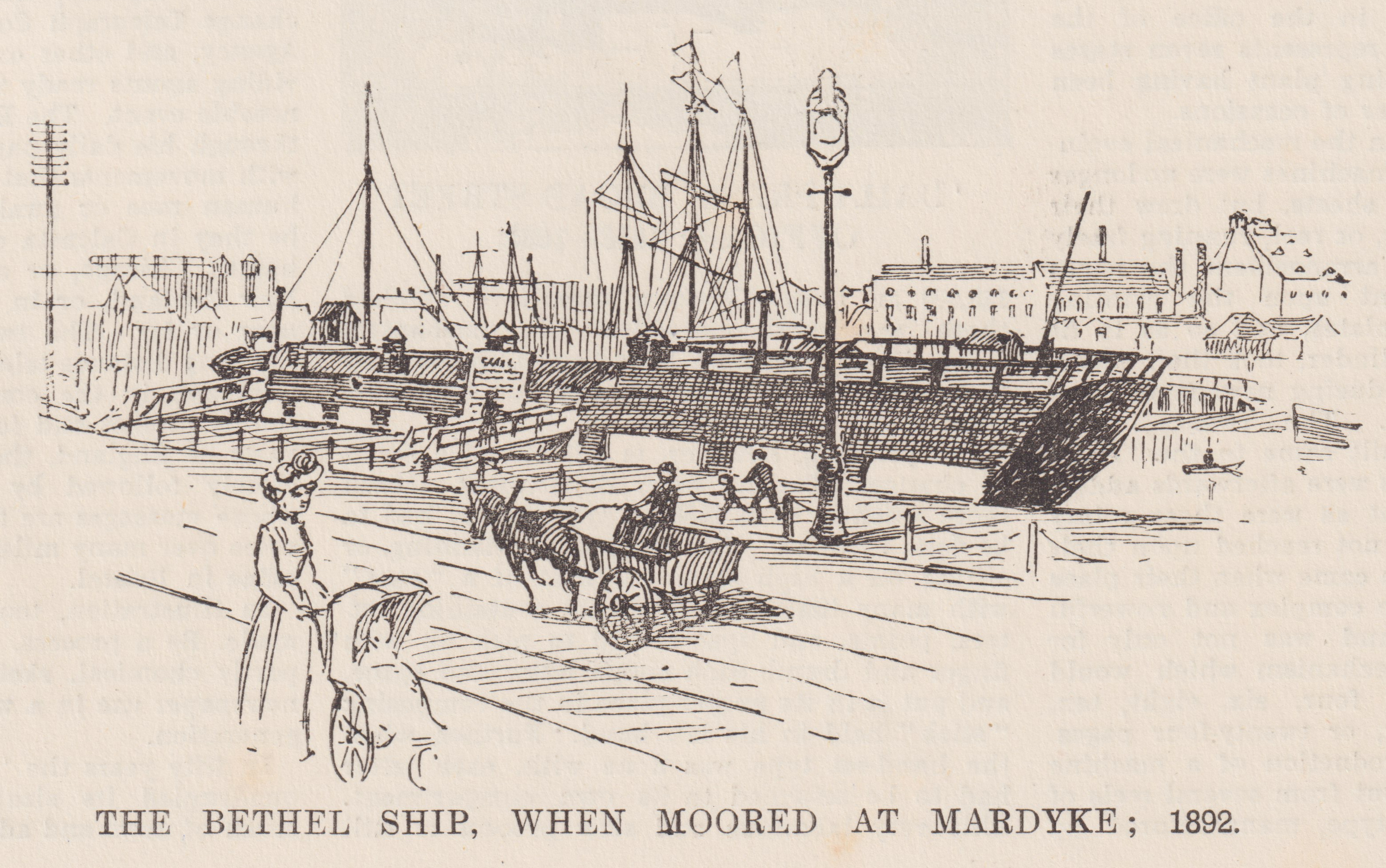
Bethel Ship, Bristol, 1892

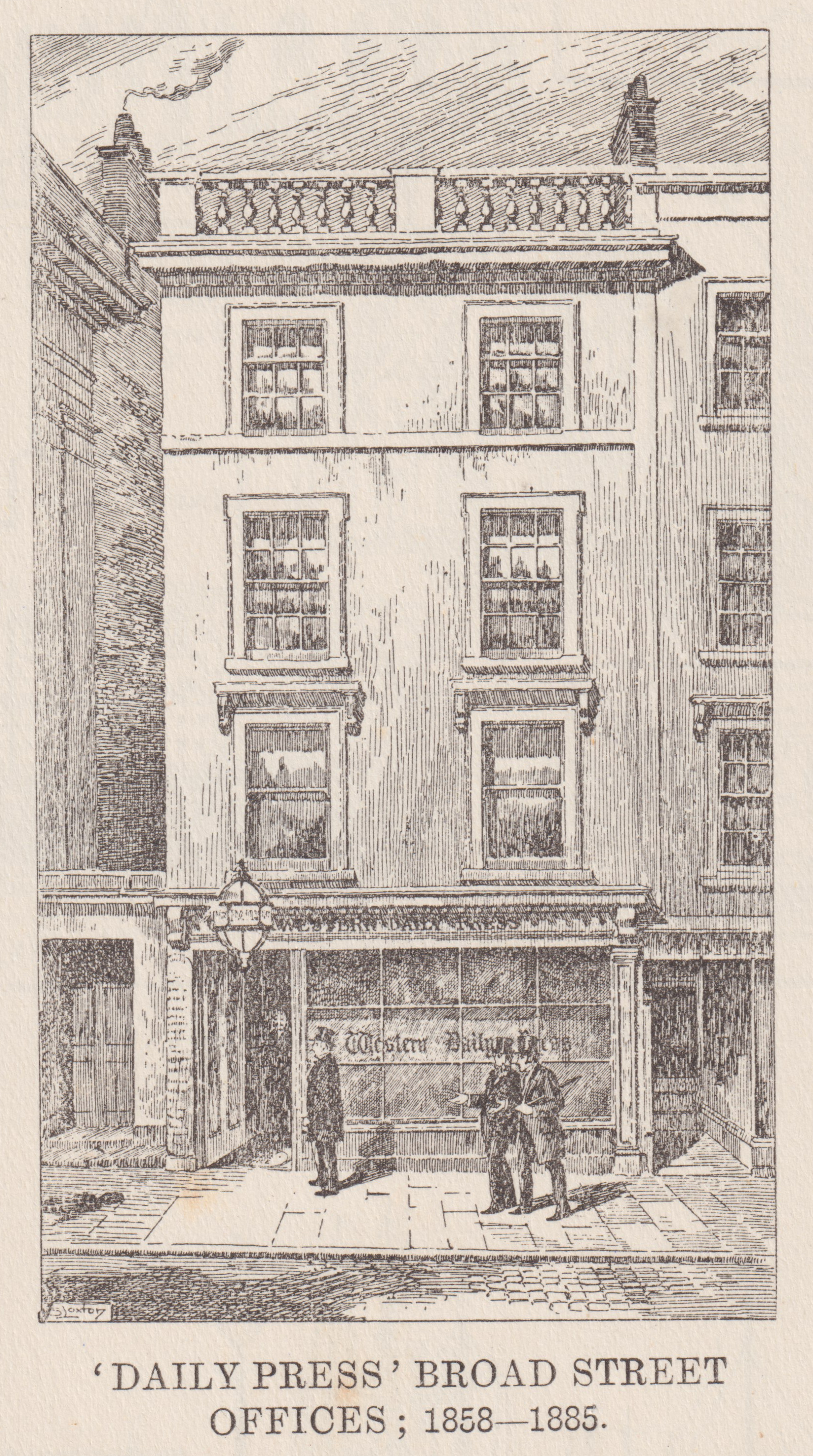
Western Daily Press offices, 1858

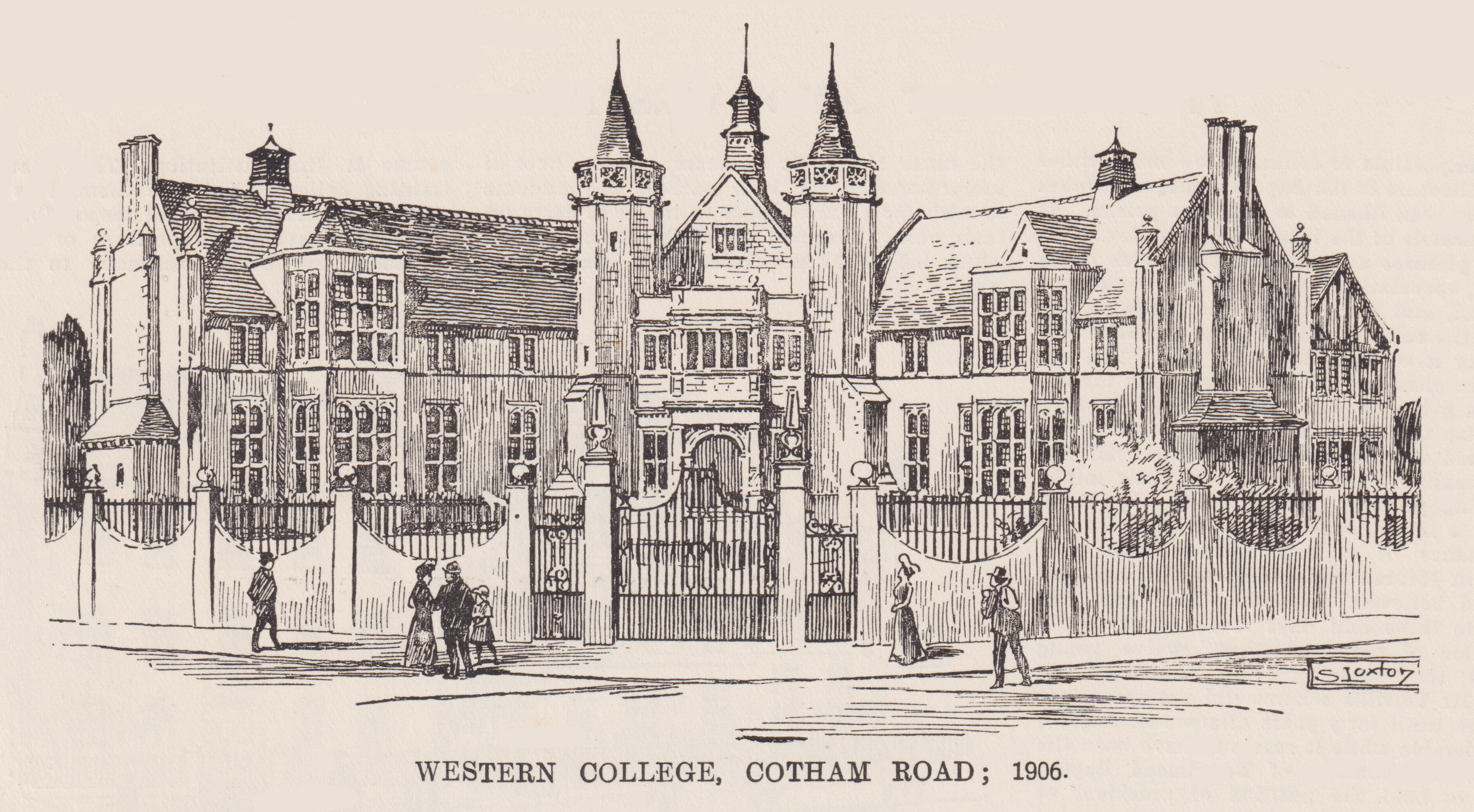
Western College, Bristol, 1906

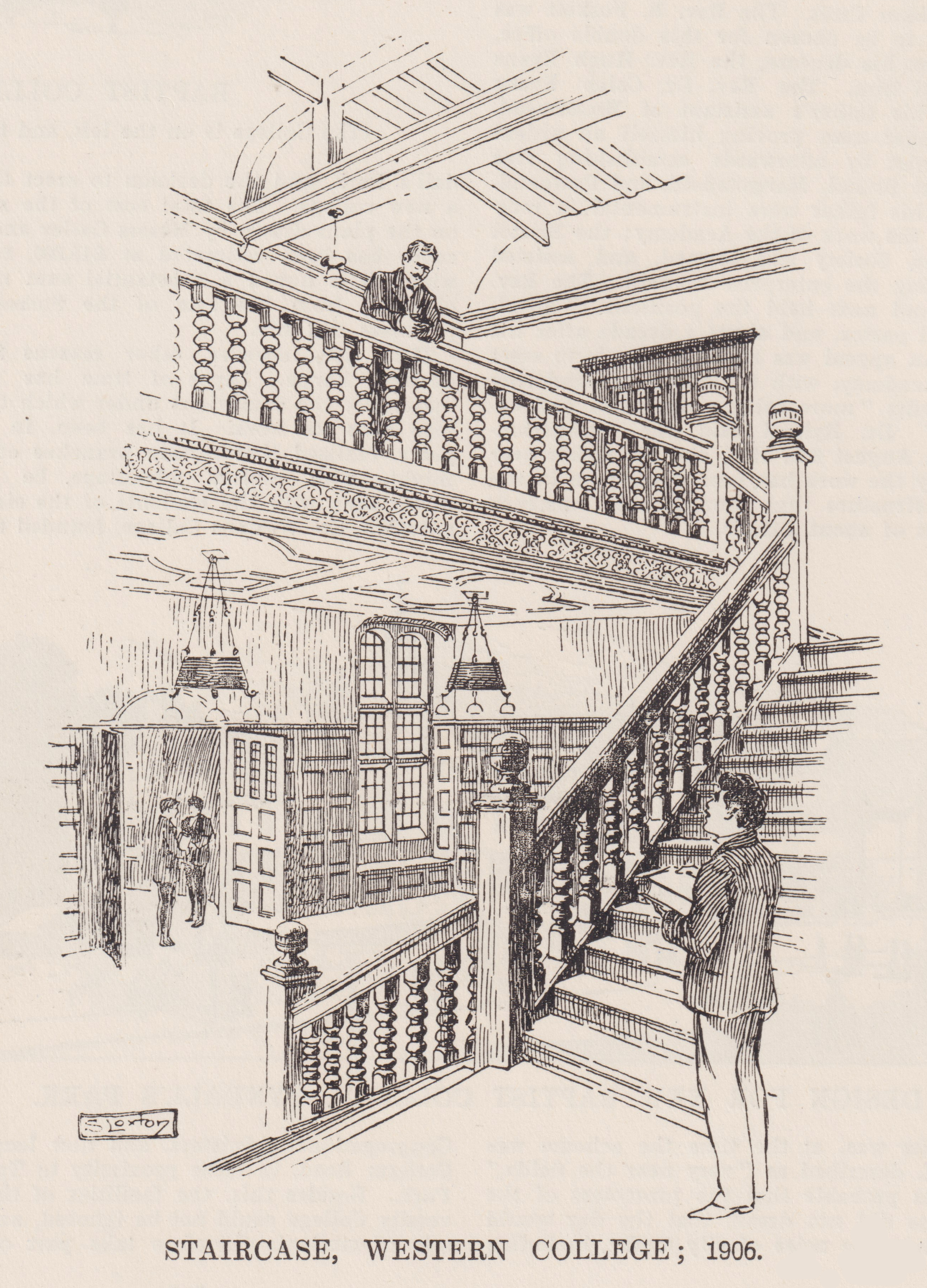
Western College, Bristol, staircase, 1906

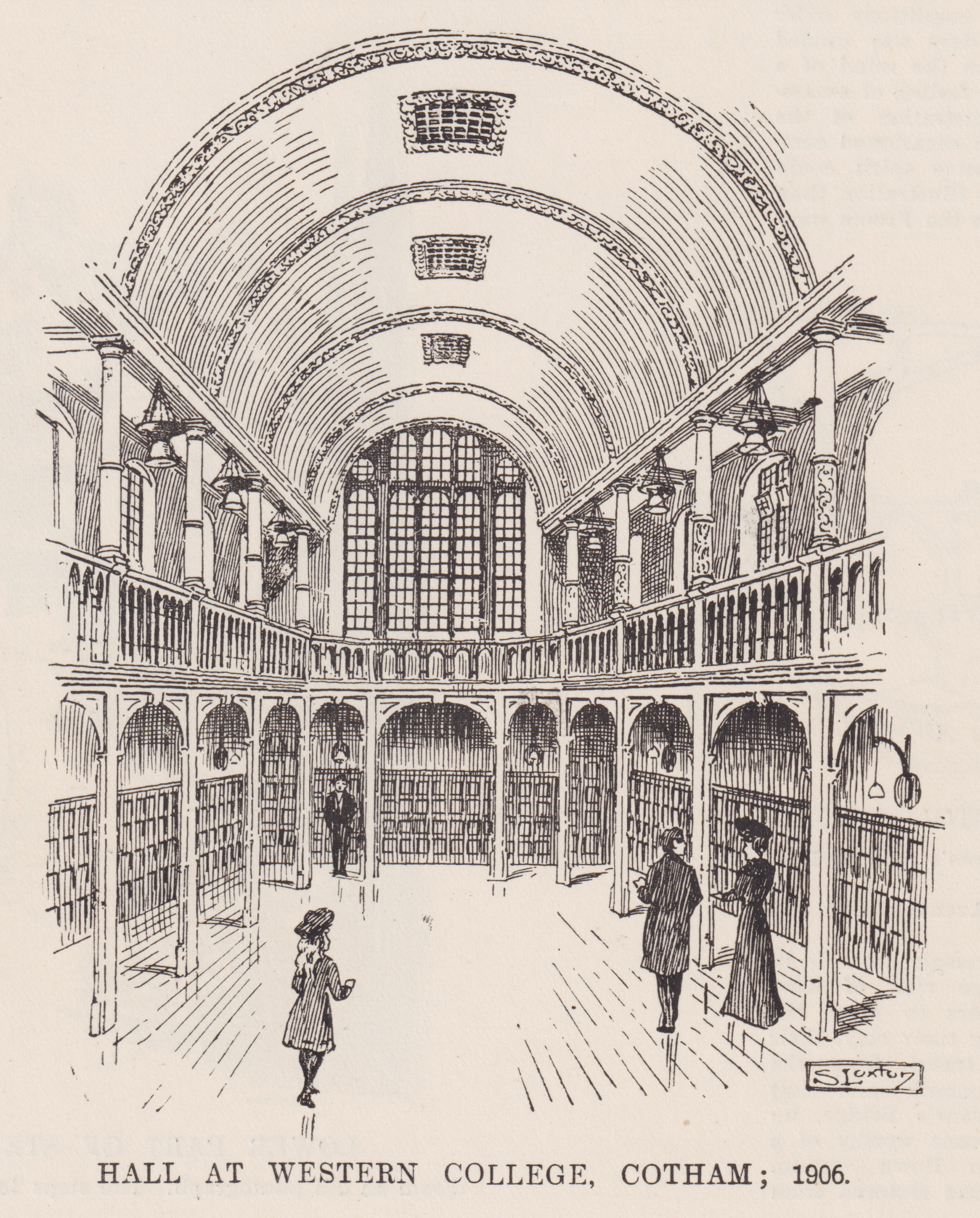
Western College, Bristol, Hall, 1906

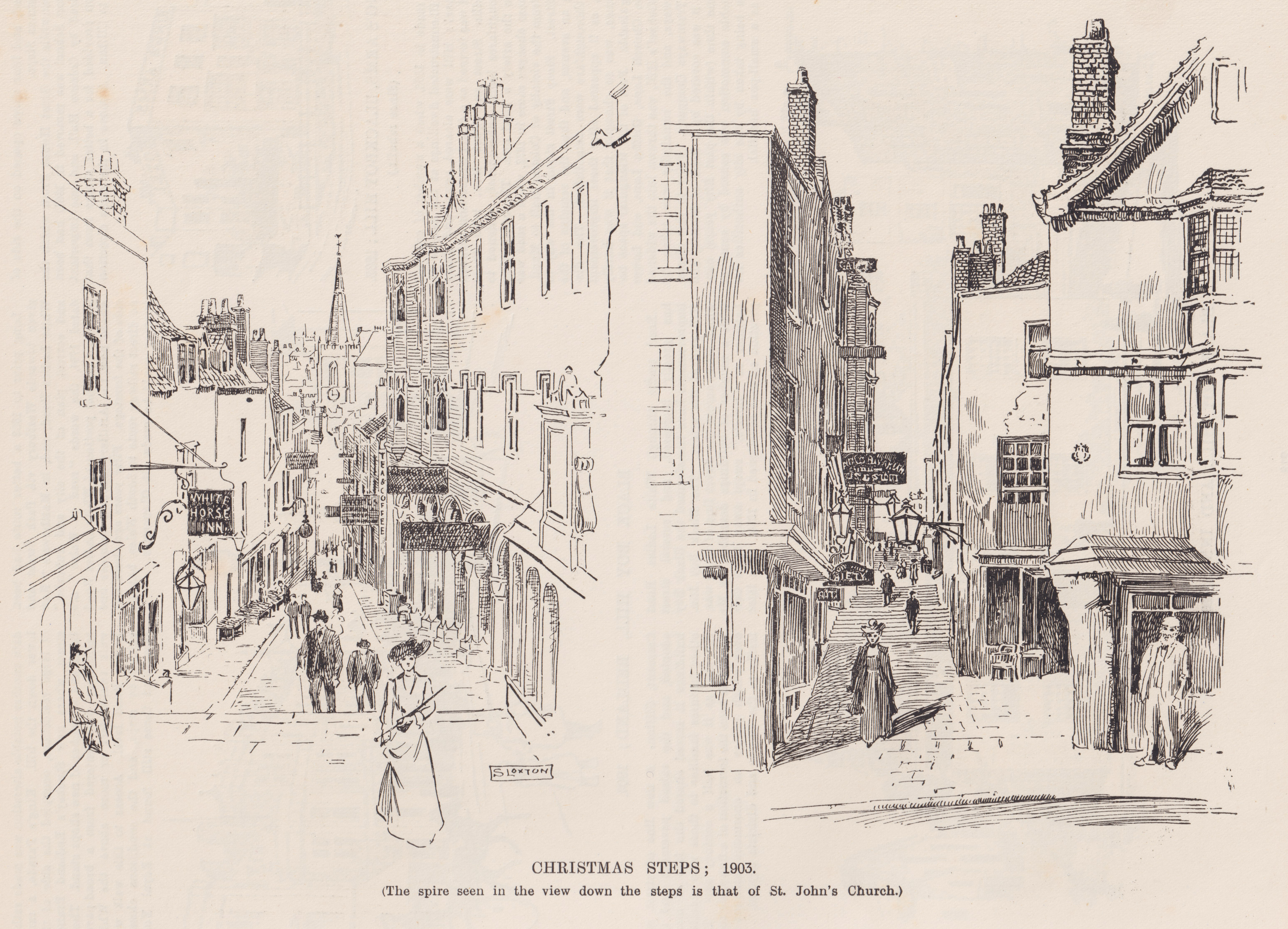
Christmas Steps, Bristol, 1903

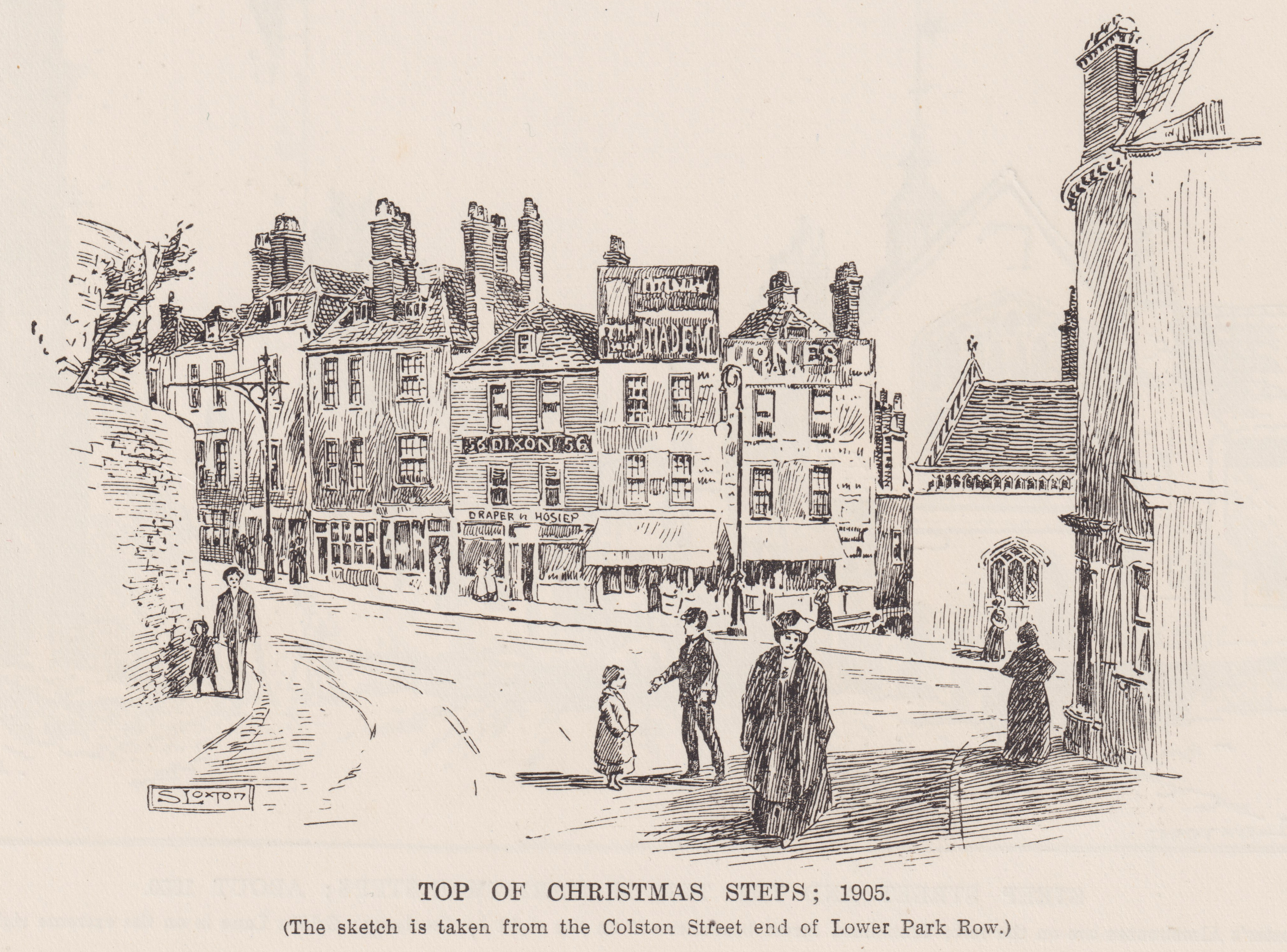
Christmas Steps, top, 1905

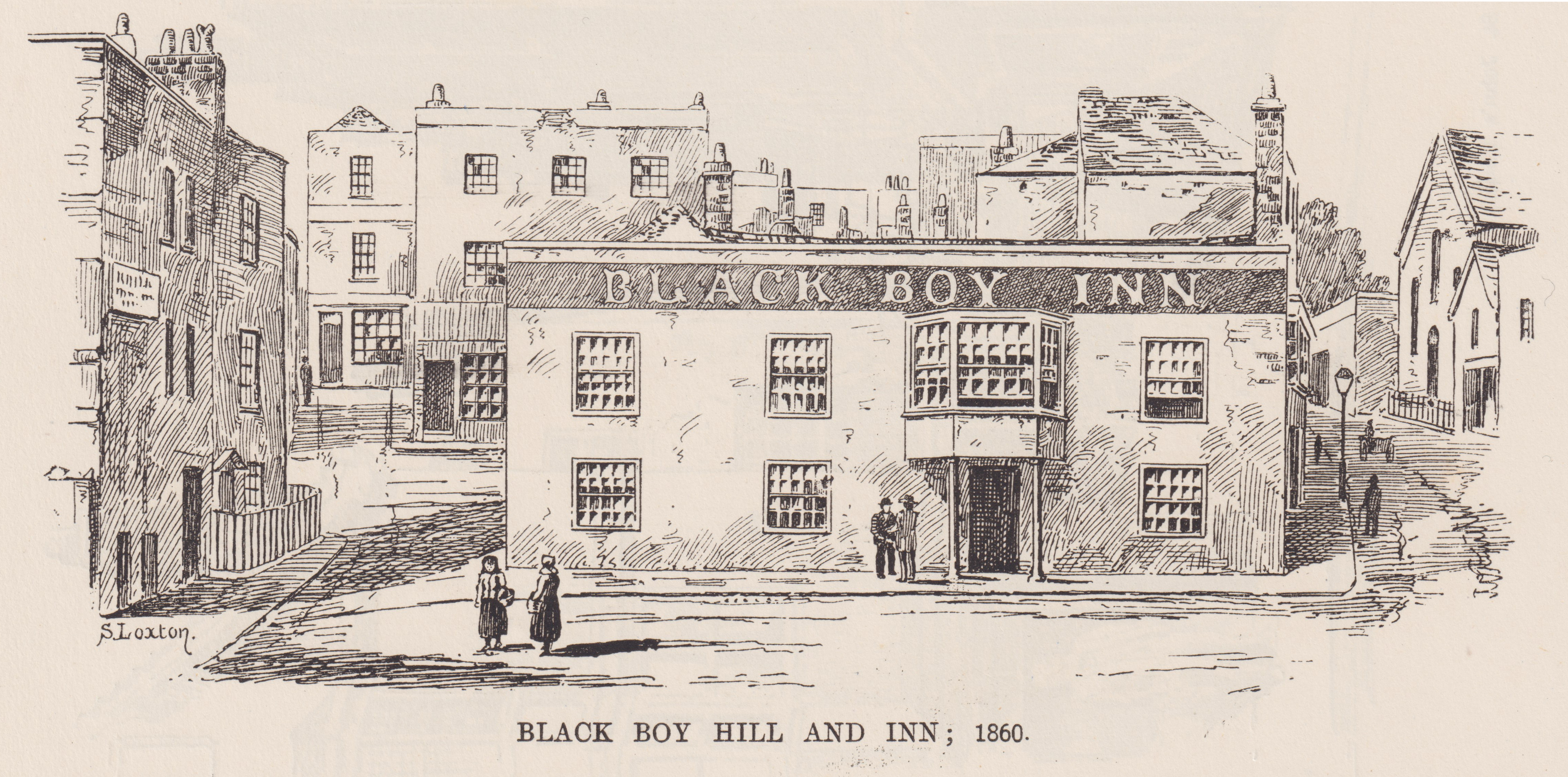
Blackboy Inn, Bristol, 1896

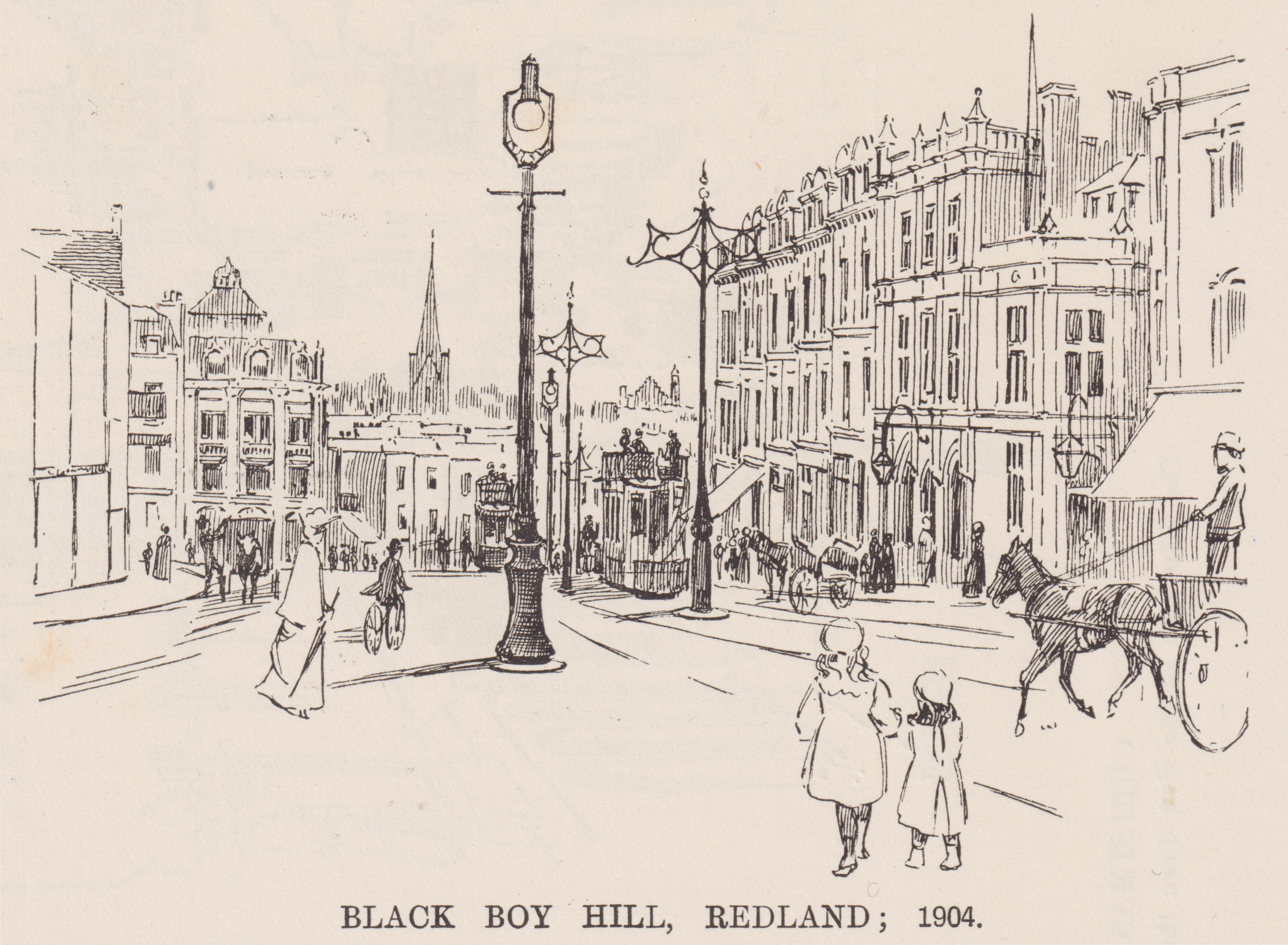
Blackboy Hill, 1904

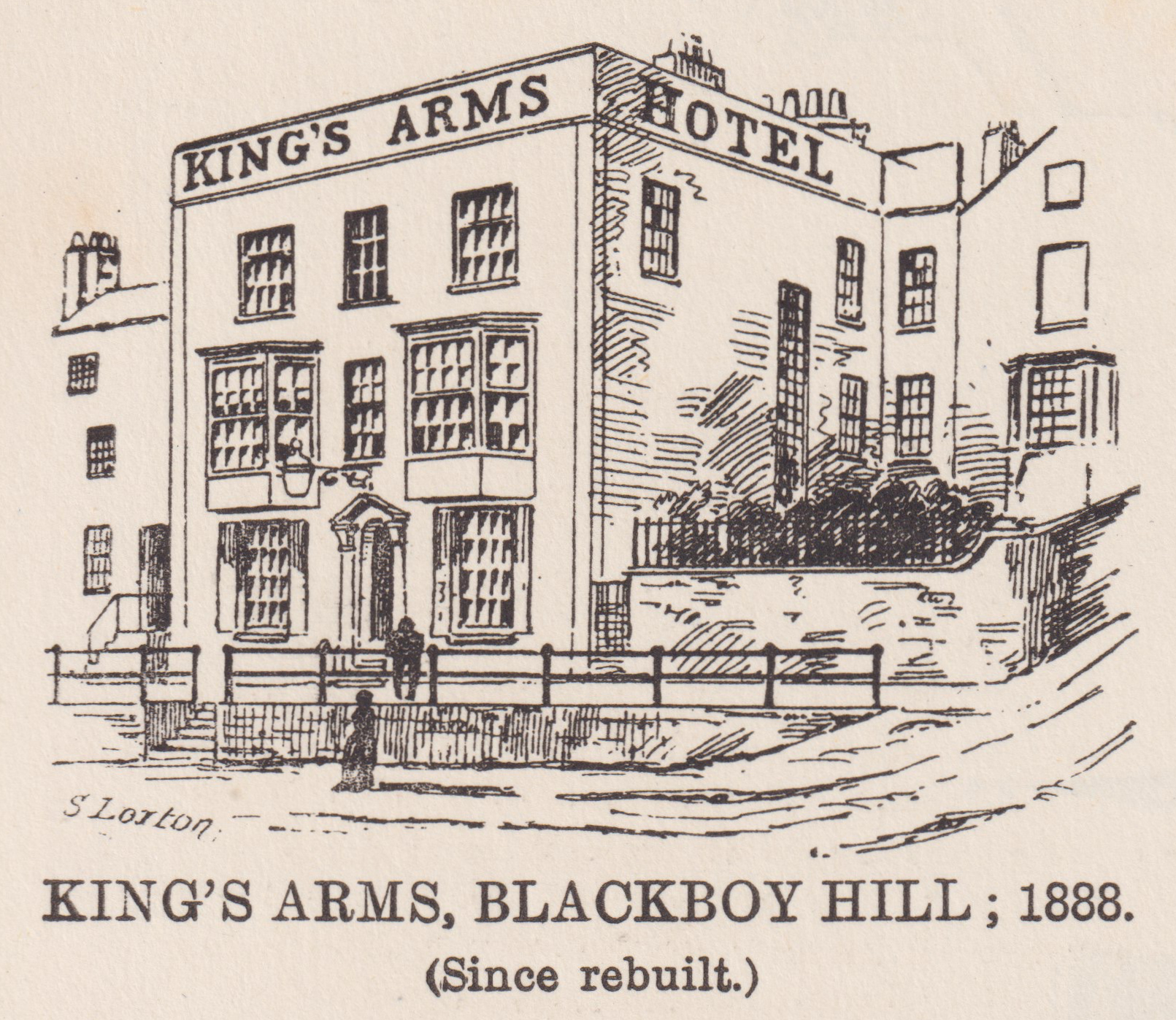
King's Arms, Blackboy Hill, 1888

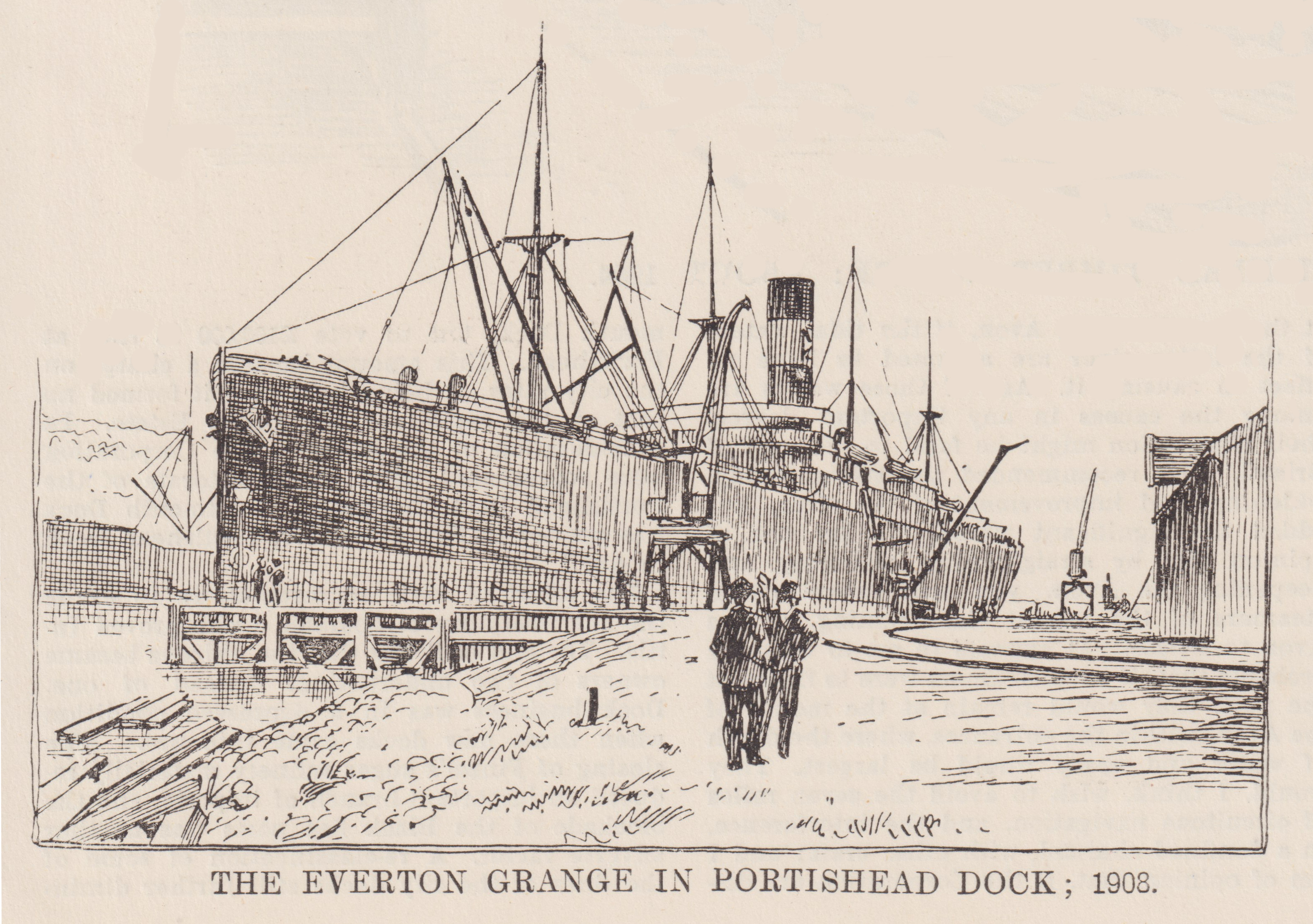
Portishead Dock, 1906

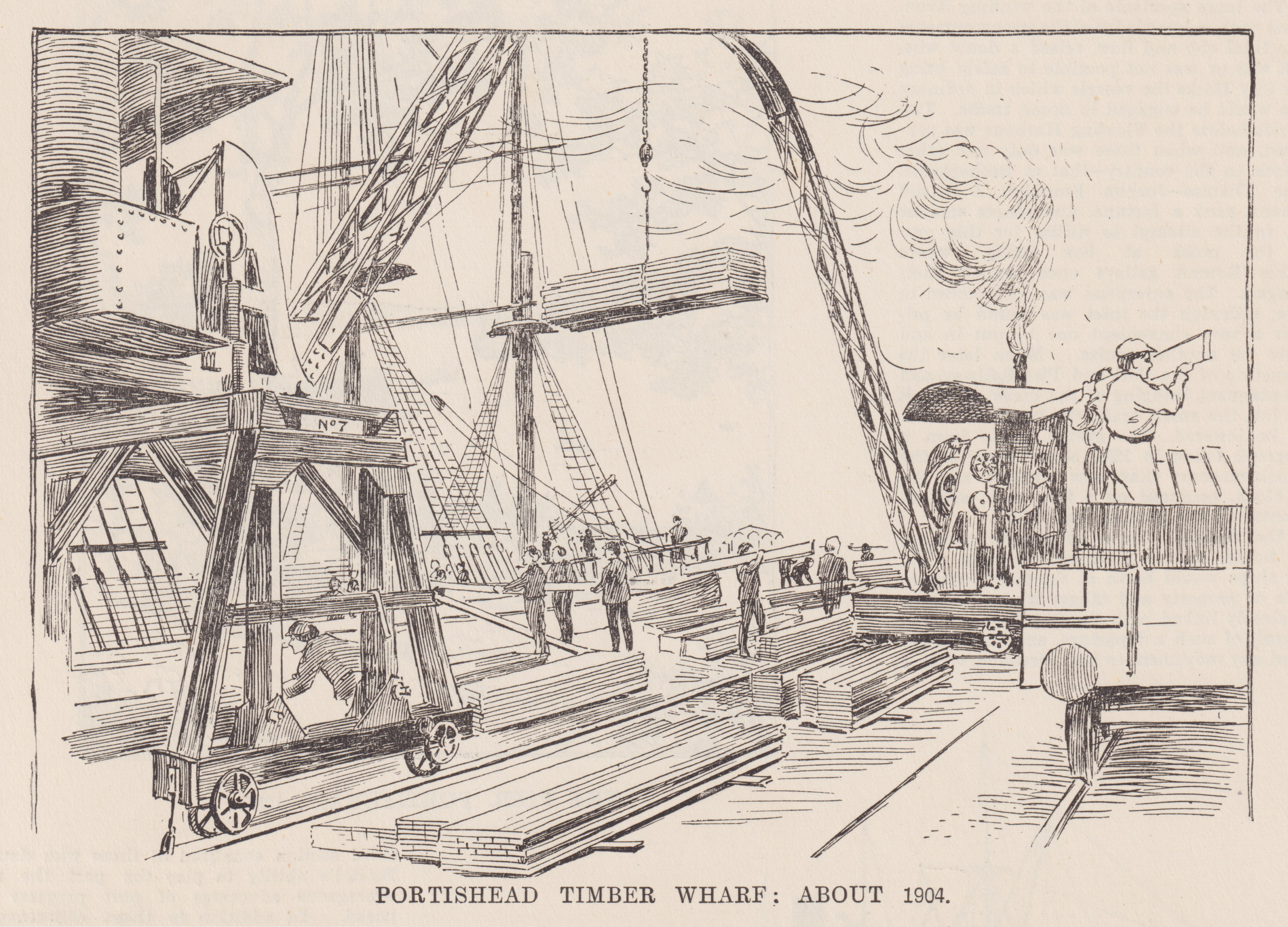
Portishead timber wharf, 1904

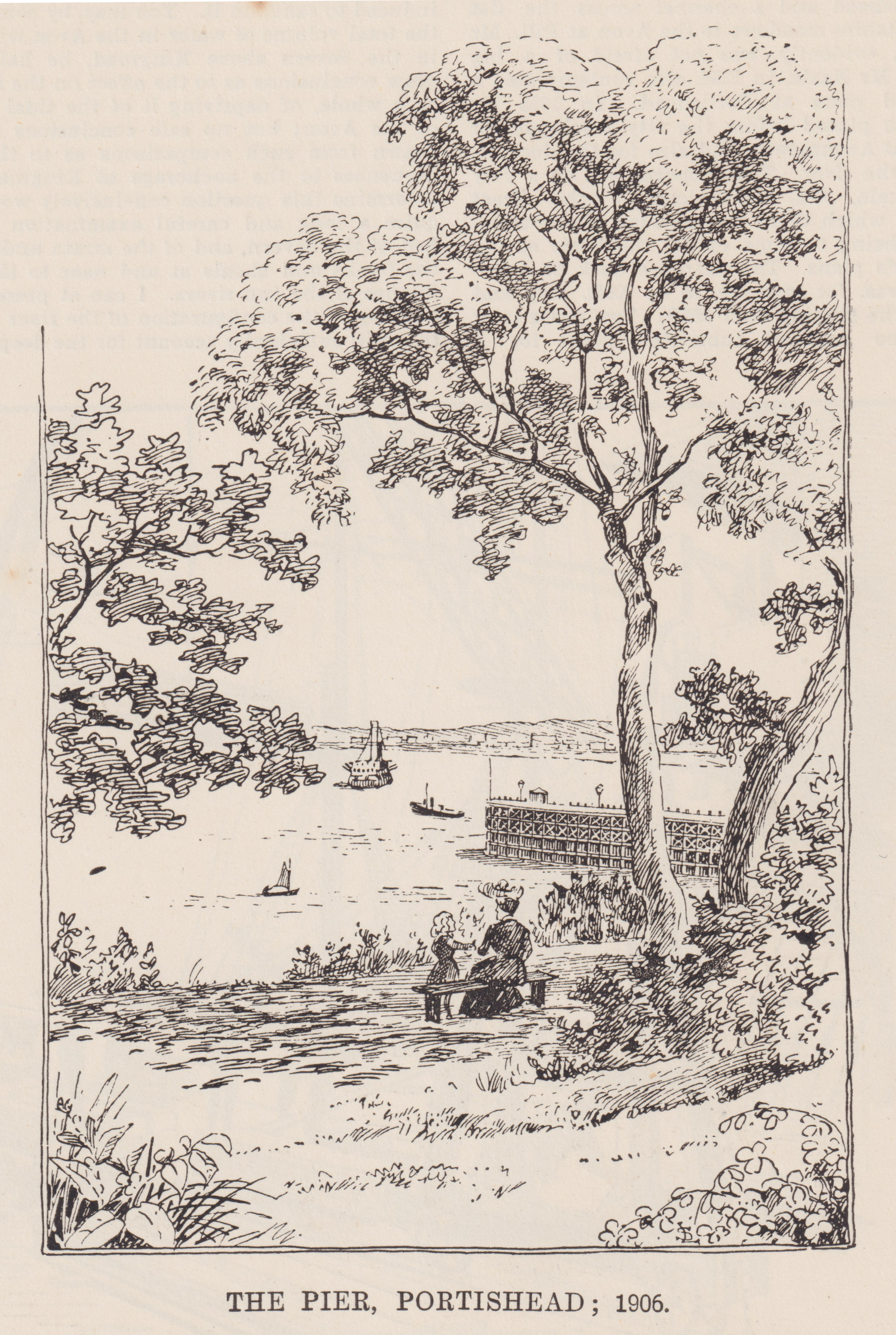
Portishead Pier, 1906

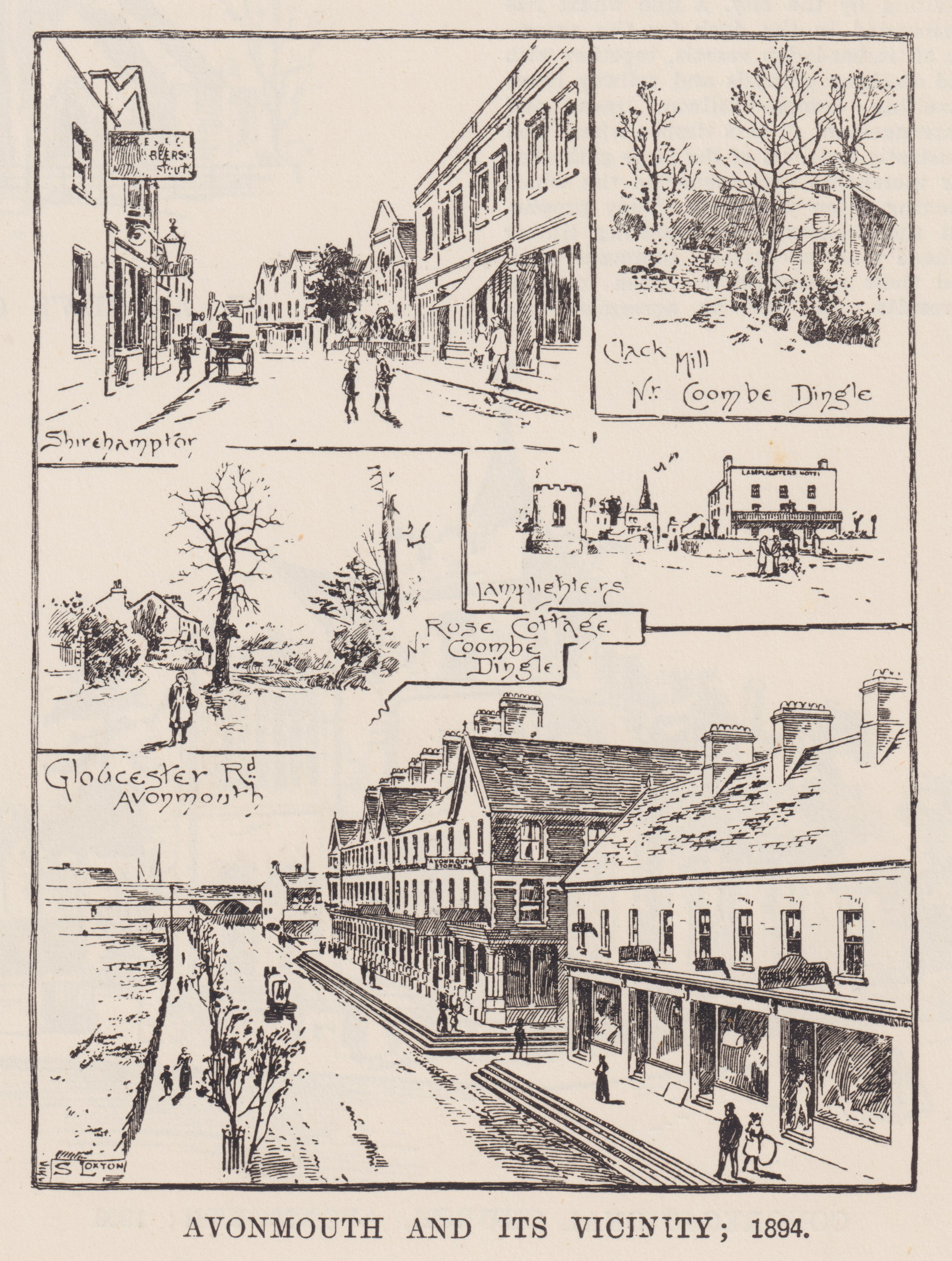
Avonmouth, 1894

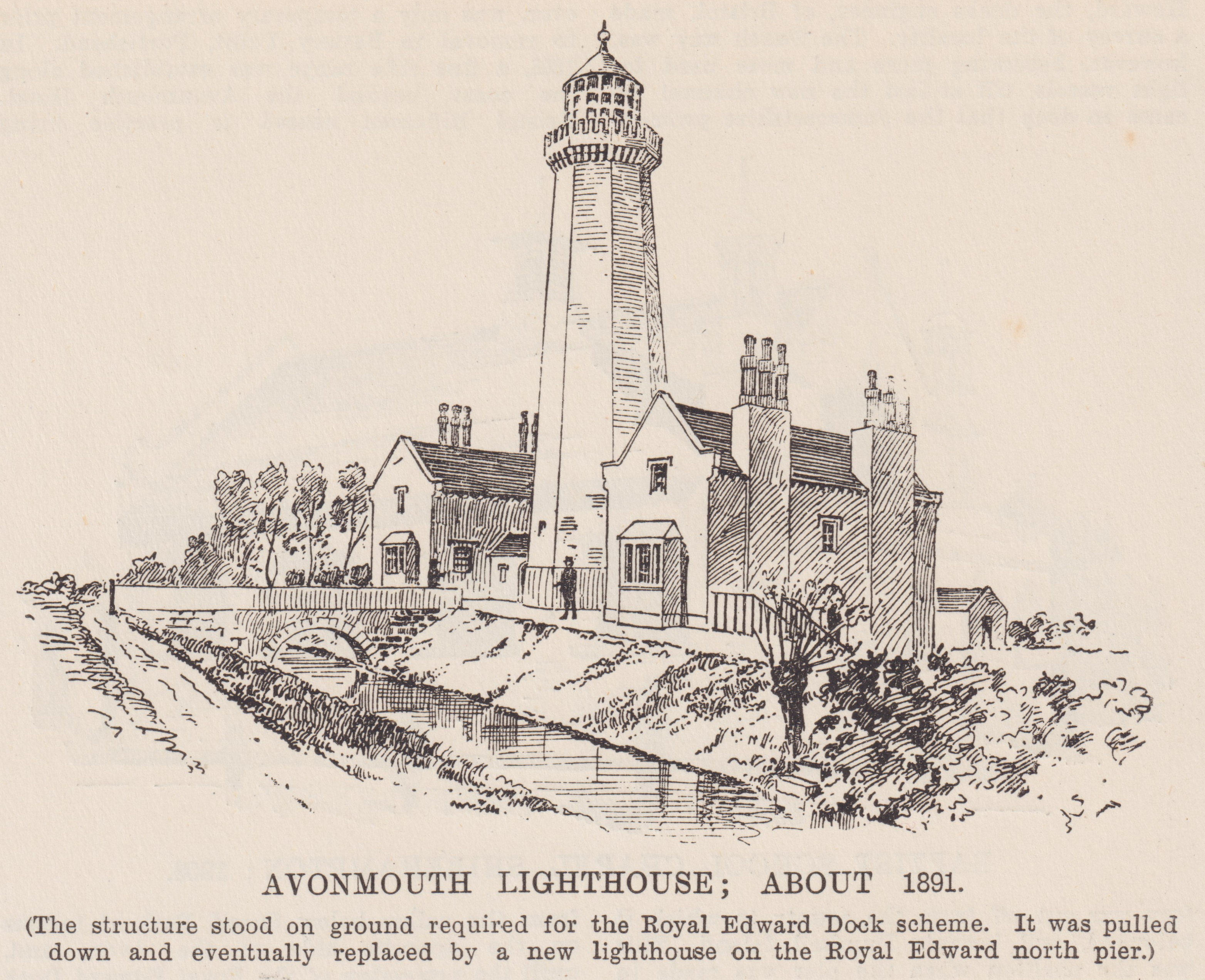
Avonmouth lighthouse, 1891

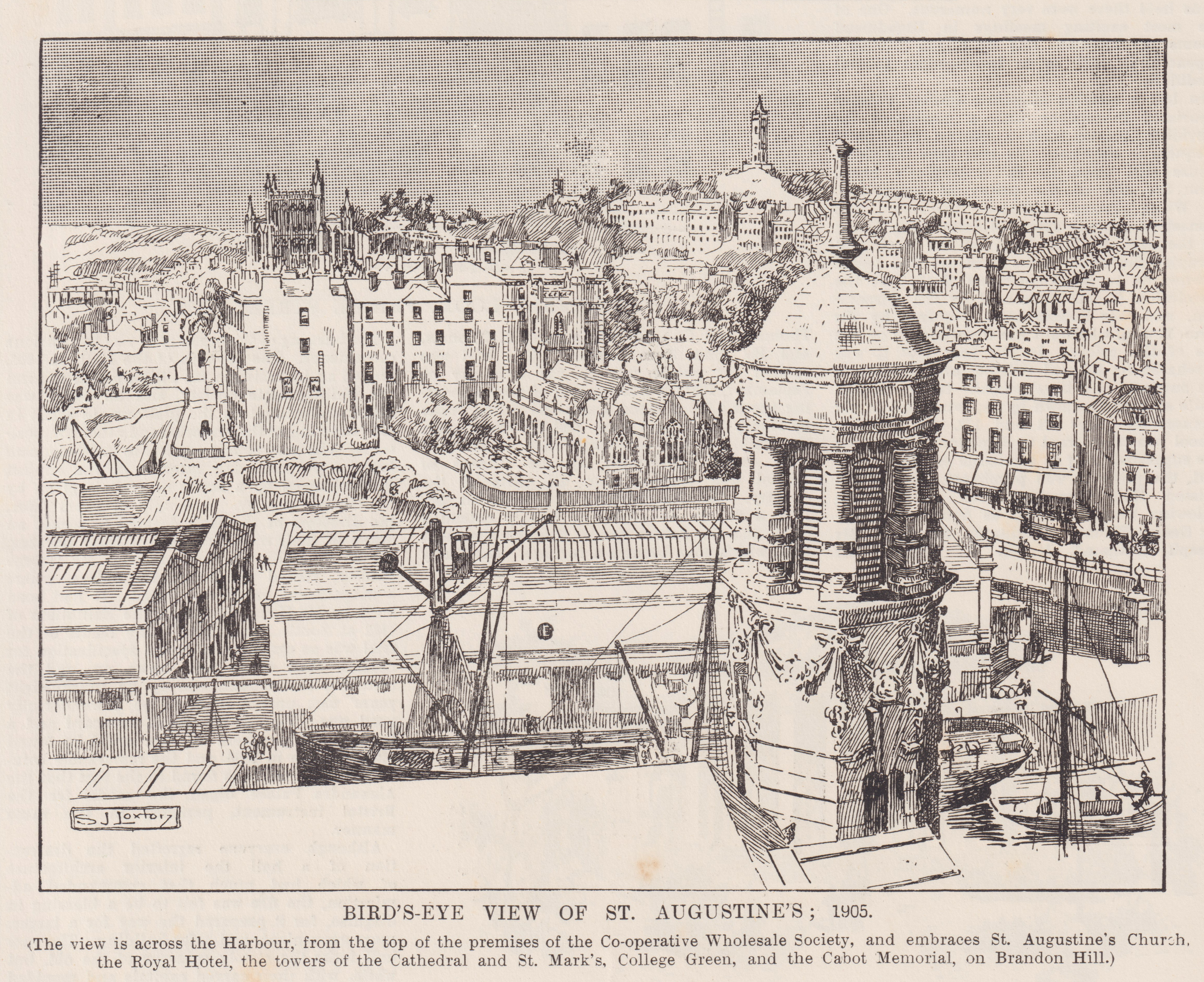
St Augustine's church, 1905

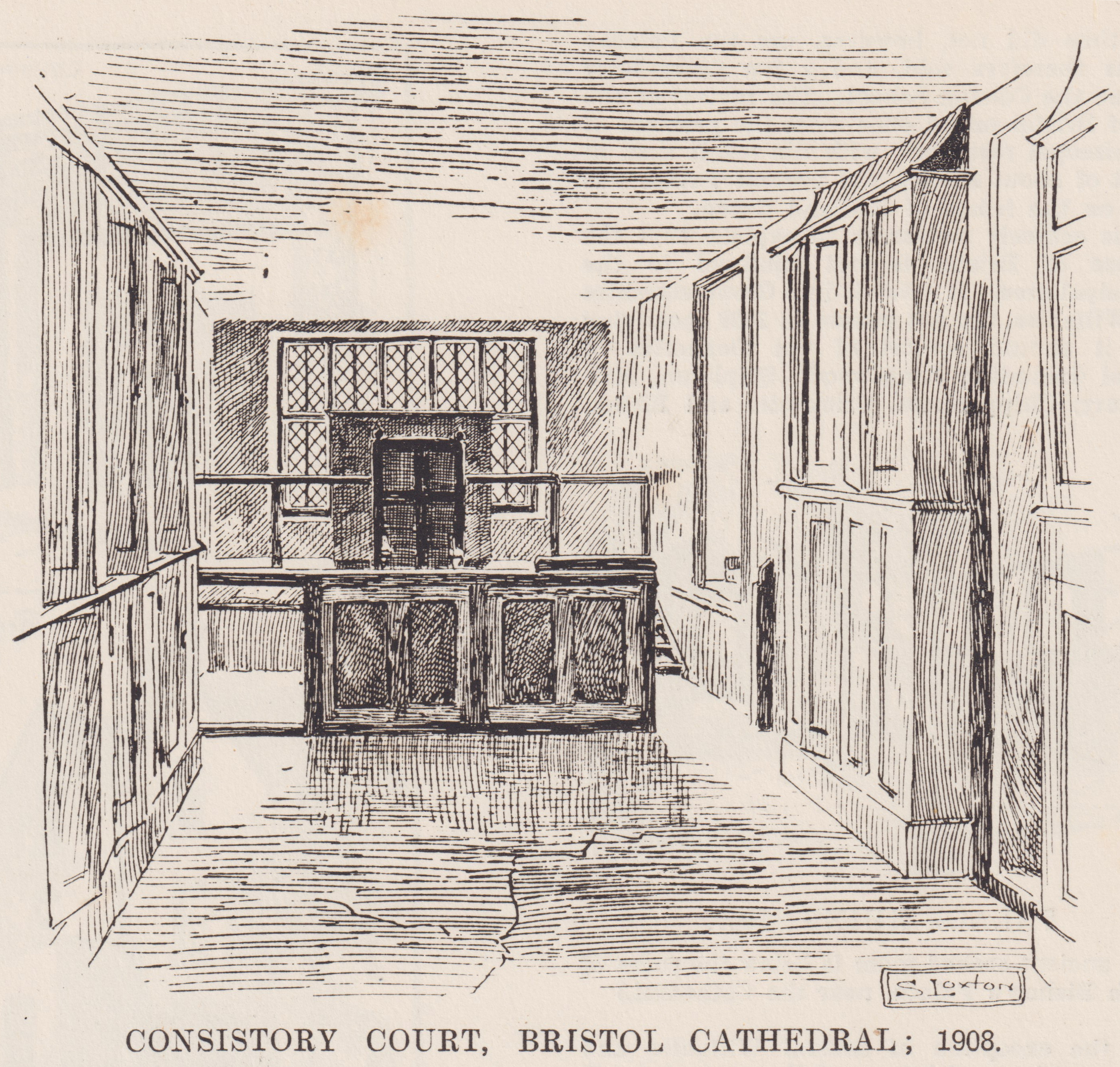
Consistory Court, 1908

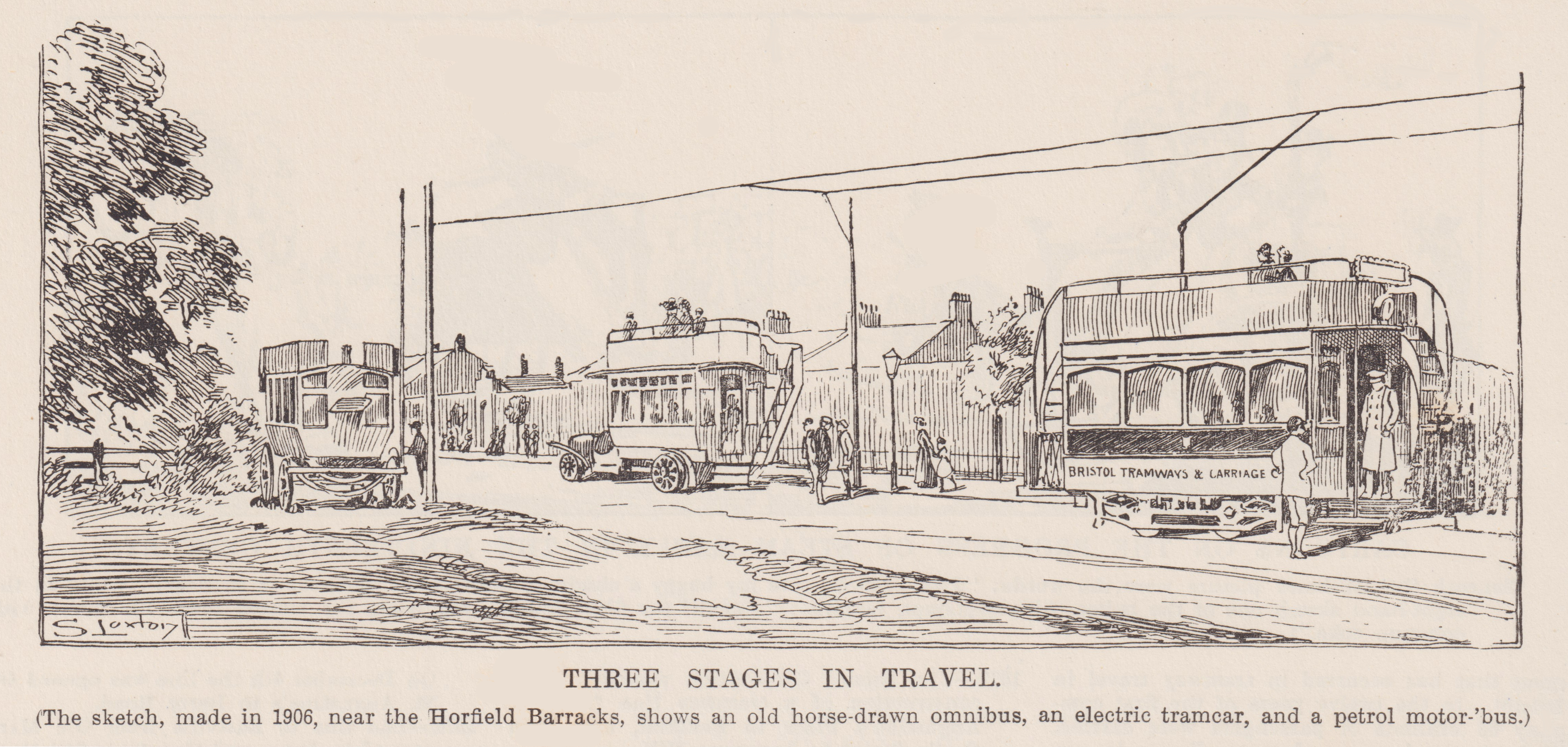
Three stages in travel, newspaper illustration, 1908

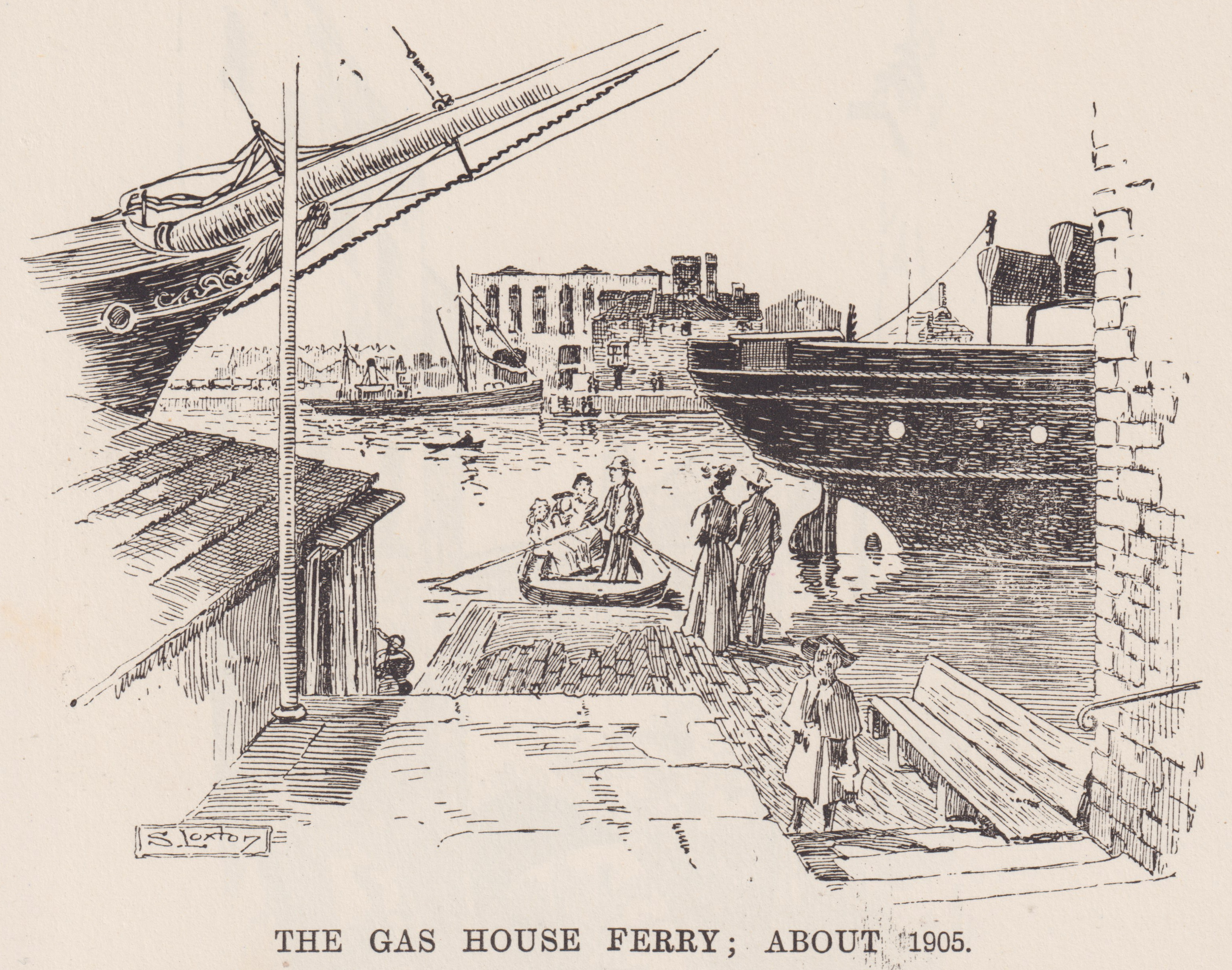
Gas House Ferry, 1905

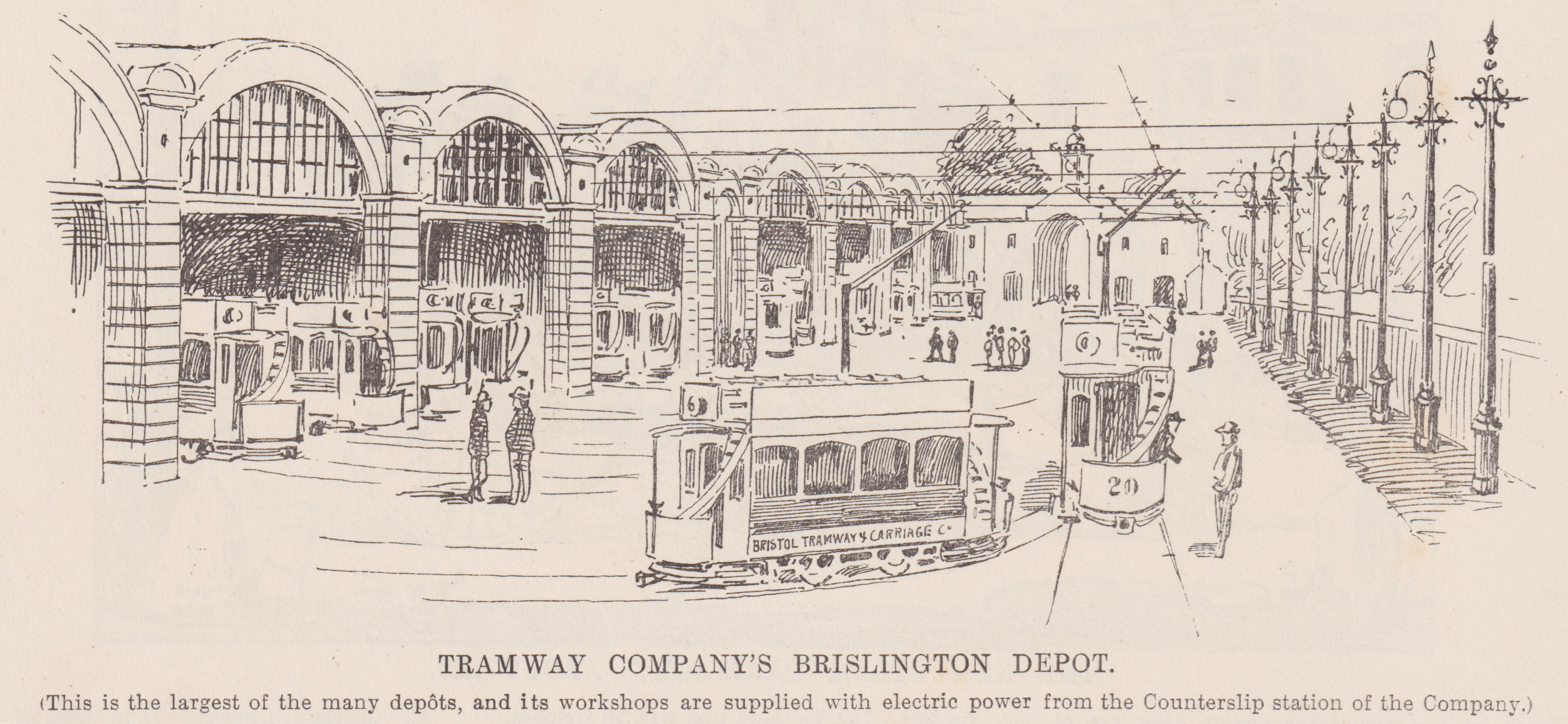
Tram depot, 1908

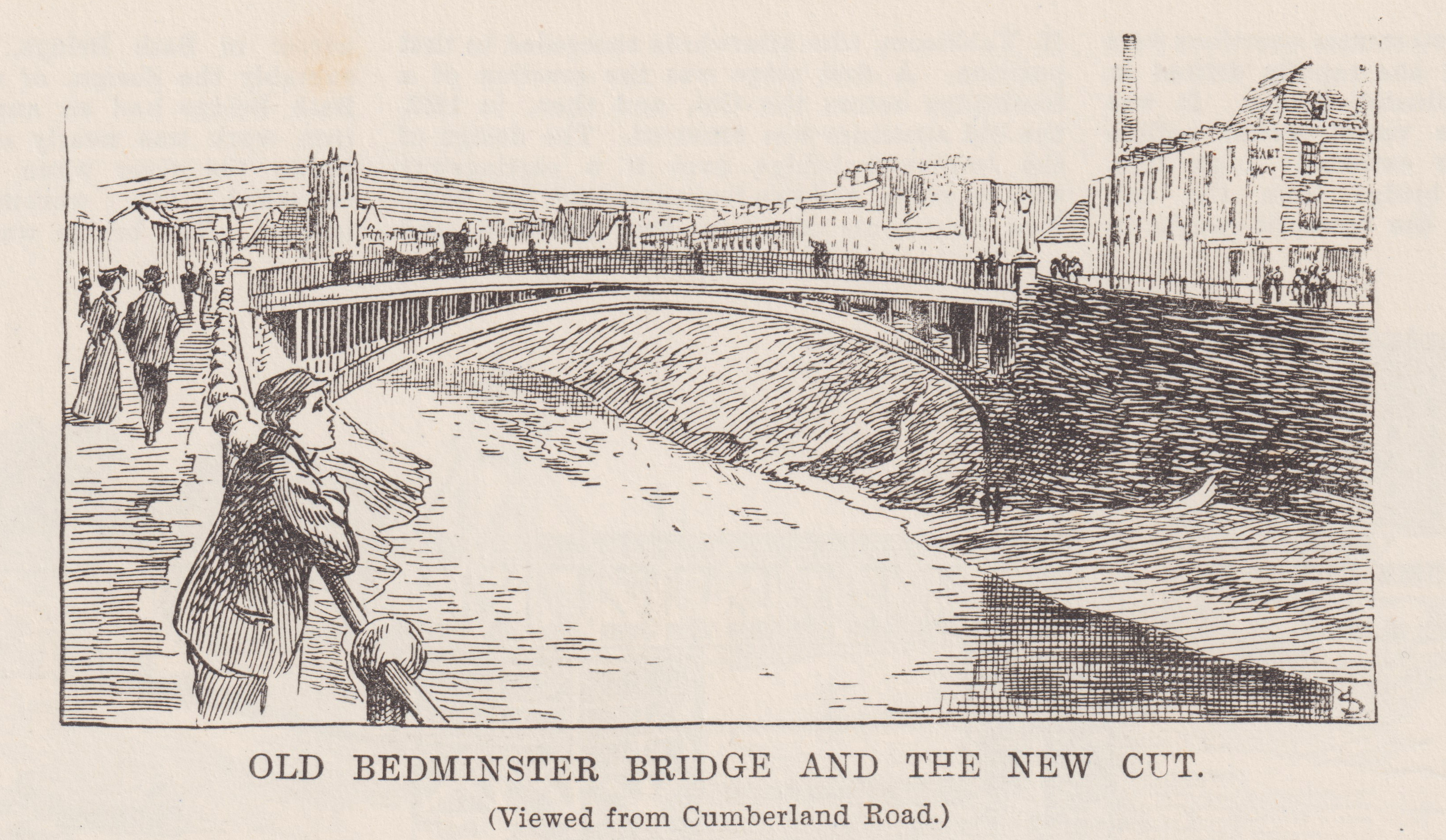
Old Bedminster Bridge, 1908

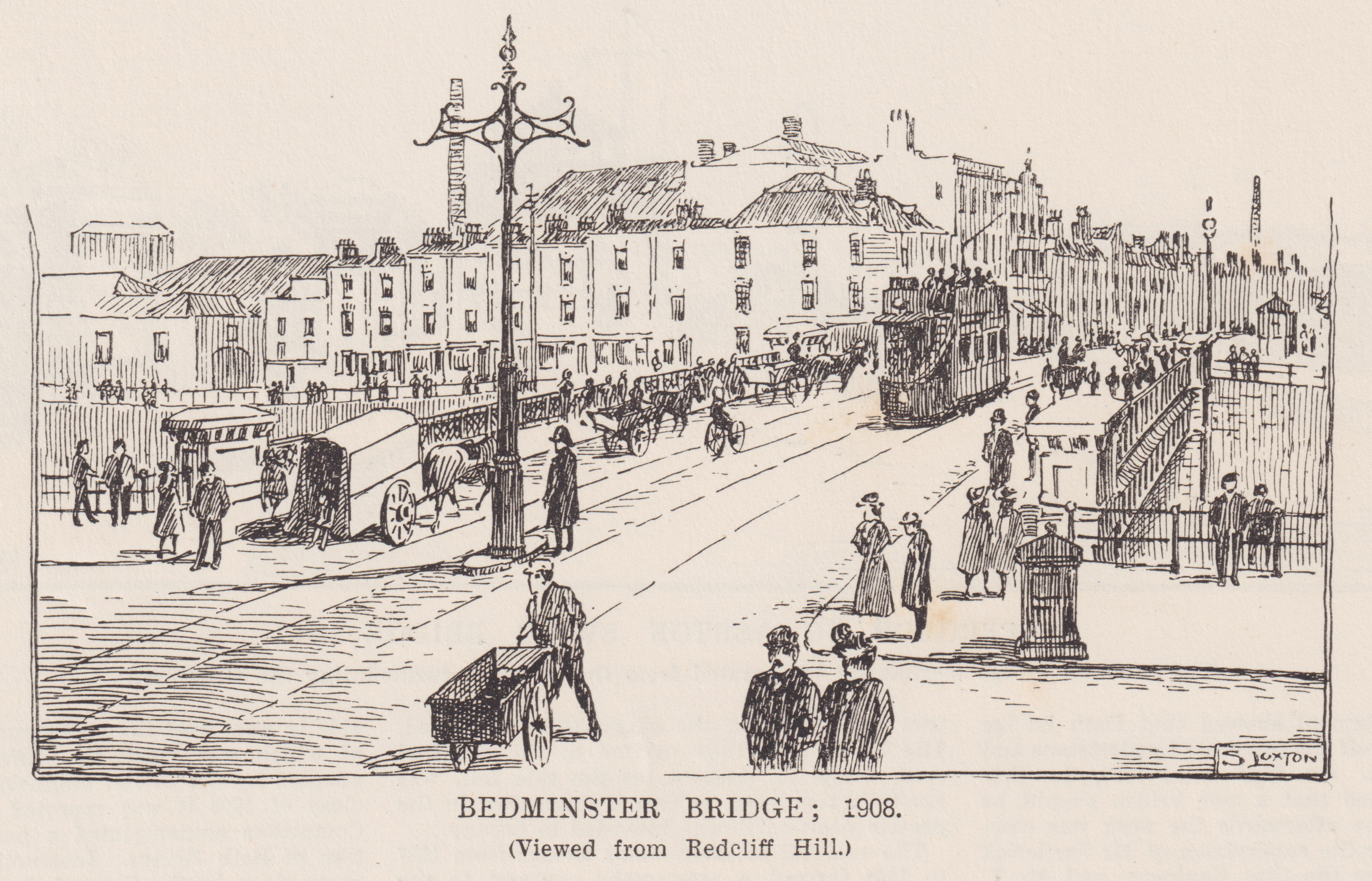
Bedminster Bridge, 1908

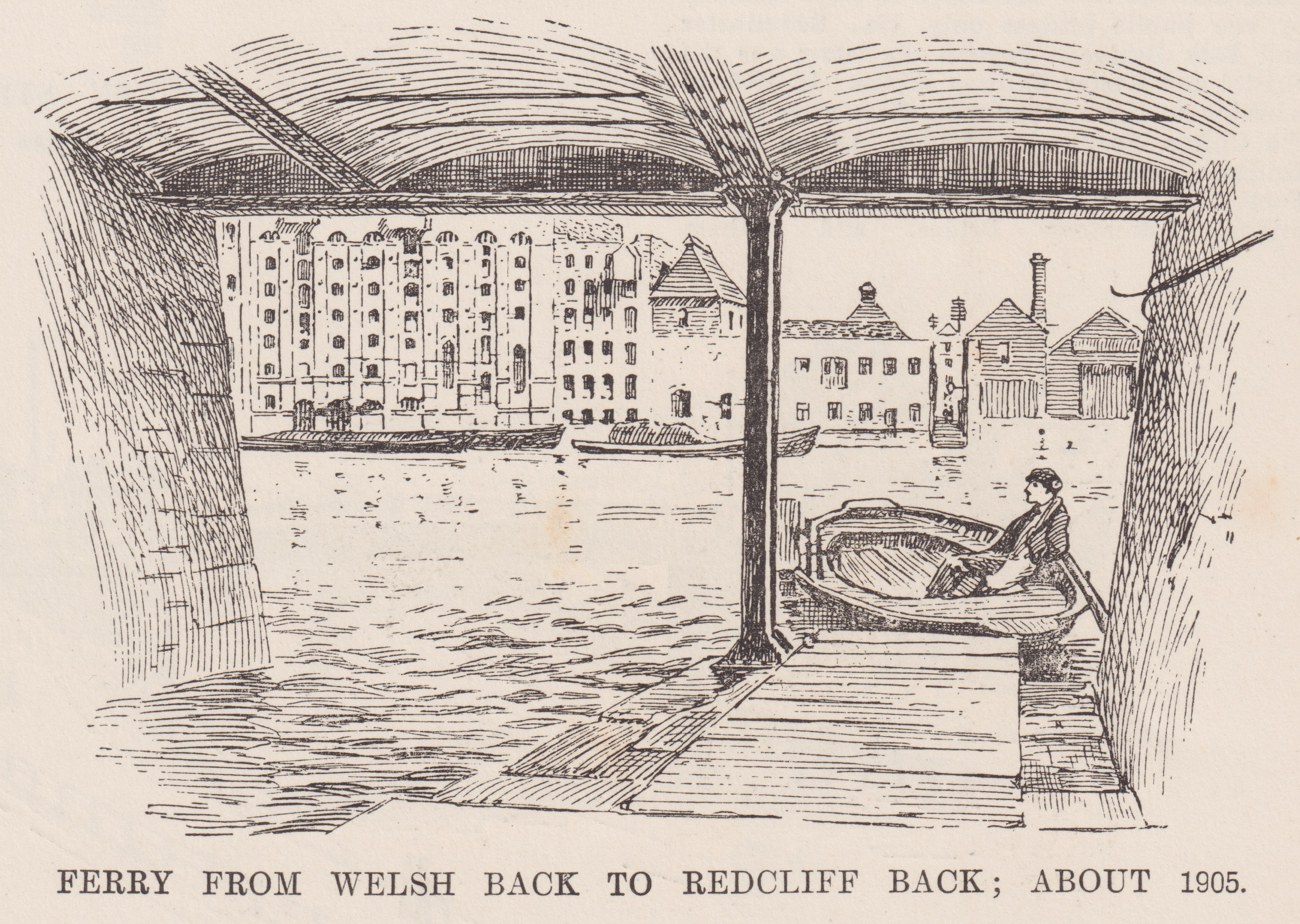
Welsh Back ferry, 1905

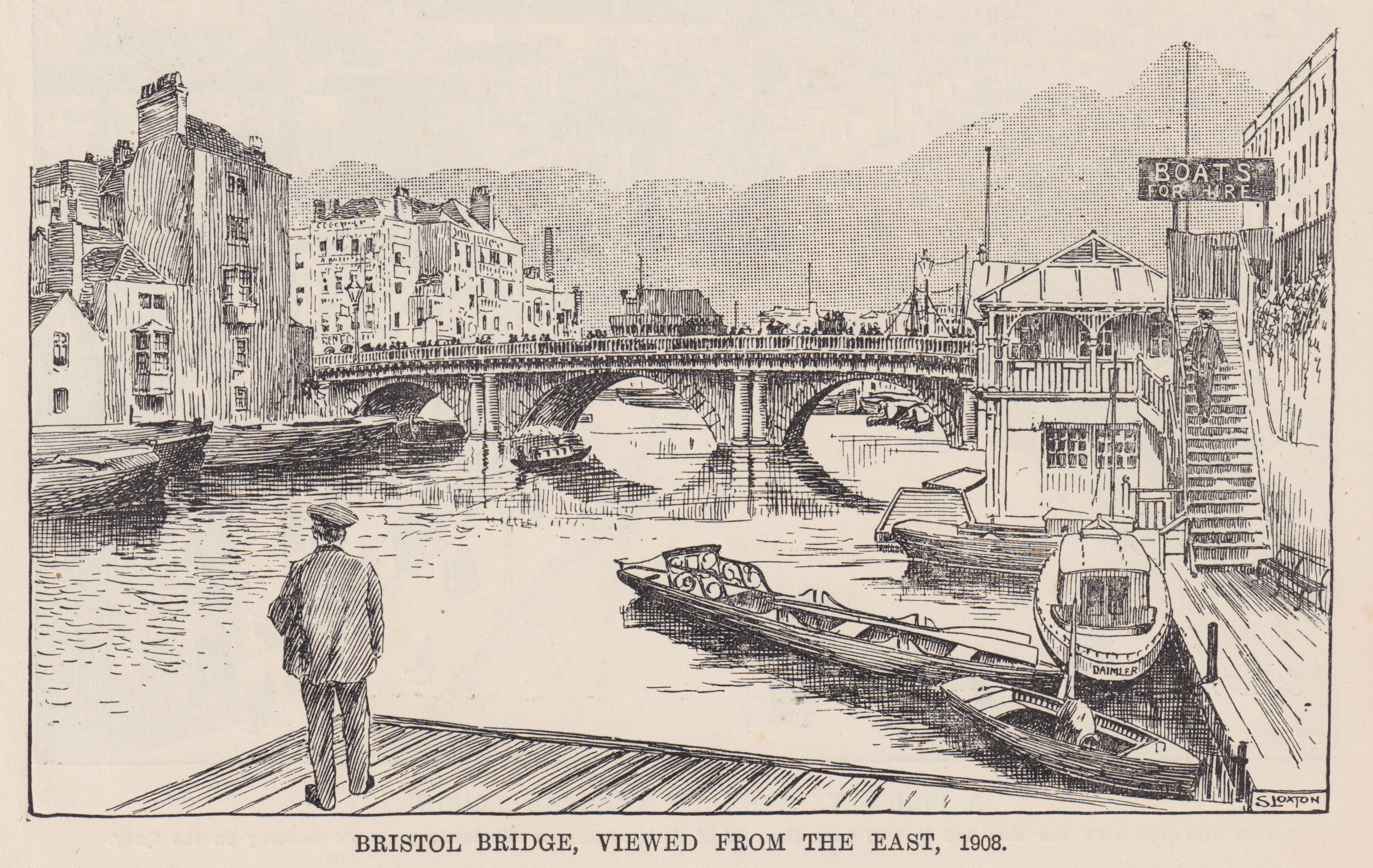
Bristol Bridge from the east, 1908

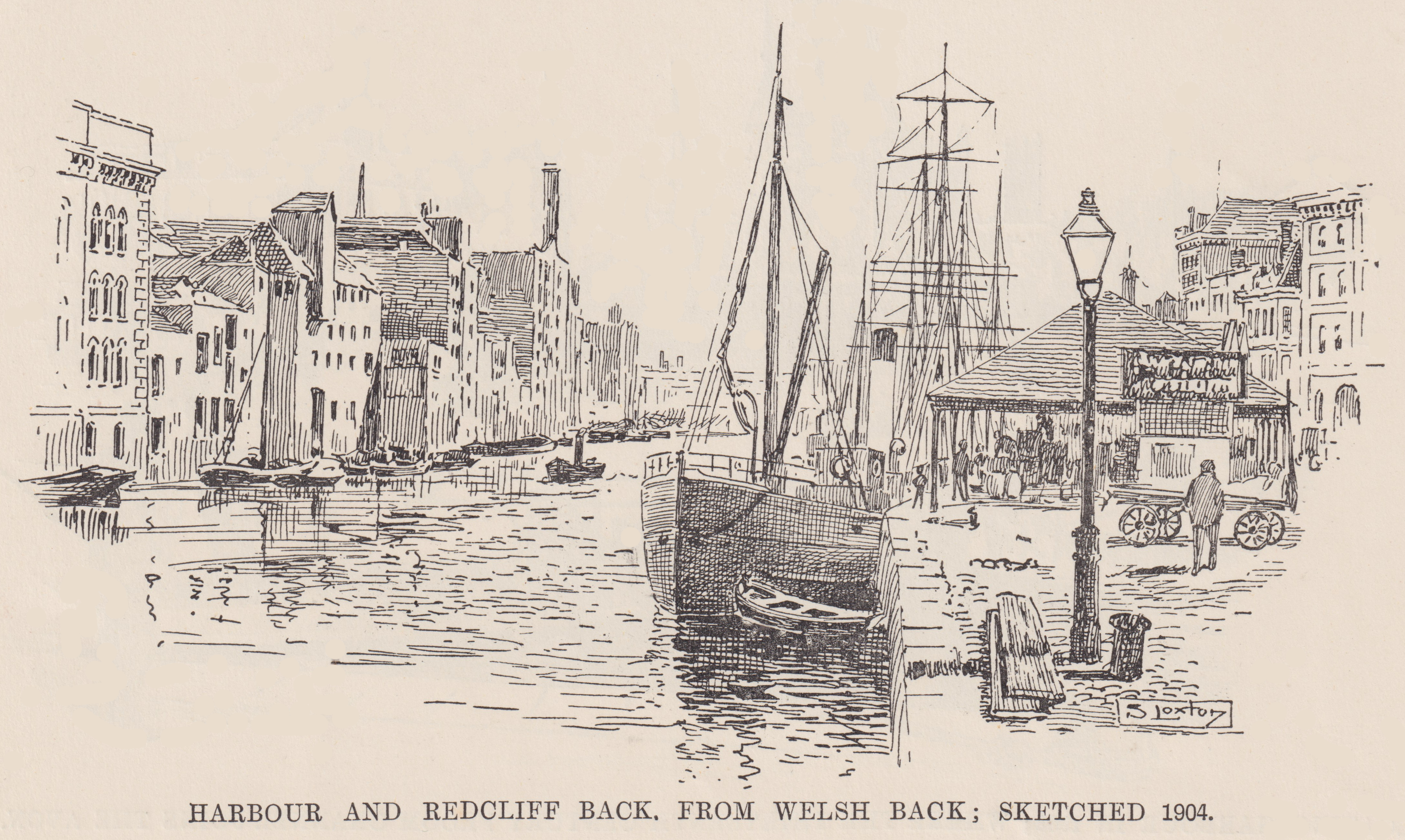
Harbour and Redcliffe Back, 1904

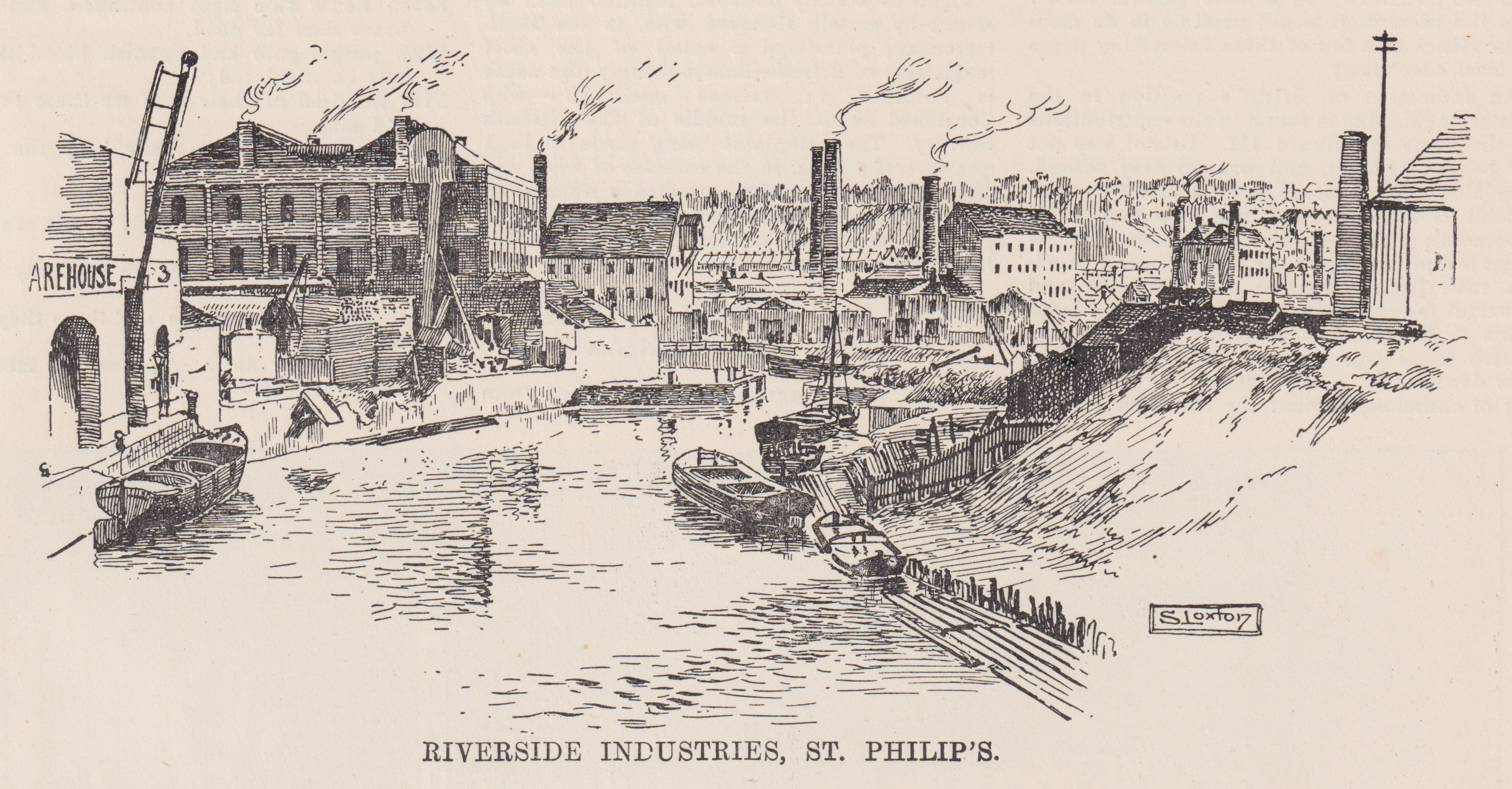
Riverside industries, St Philips, 1908

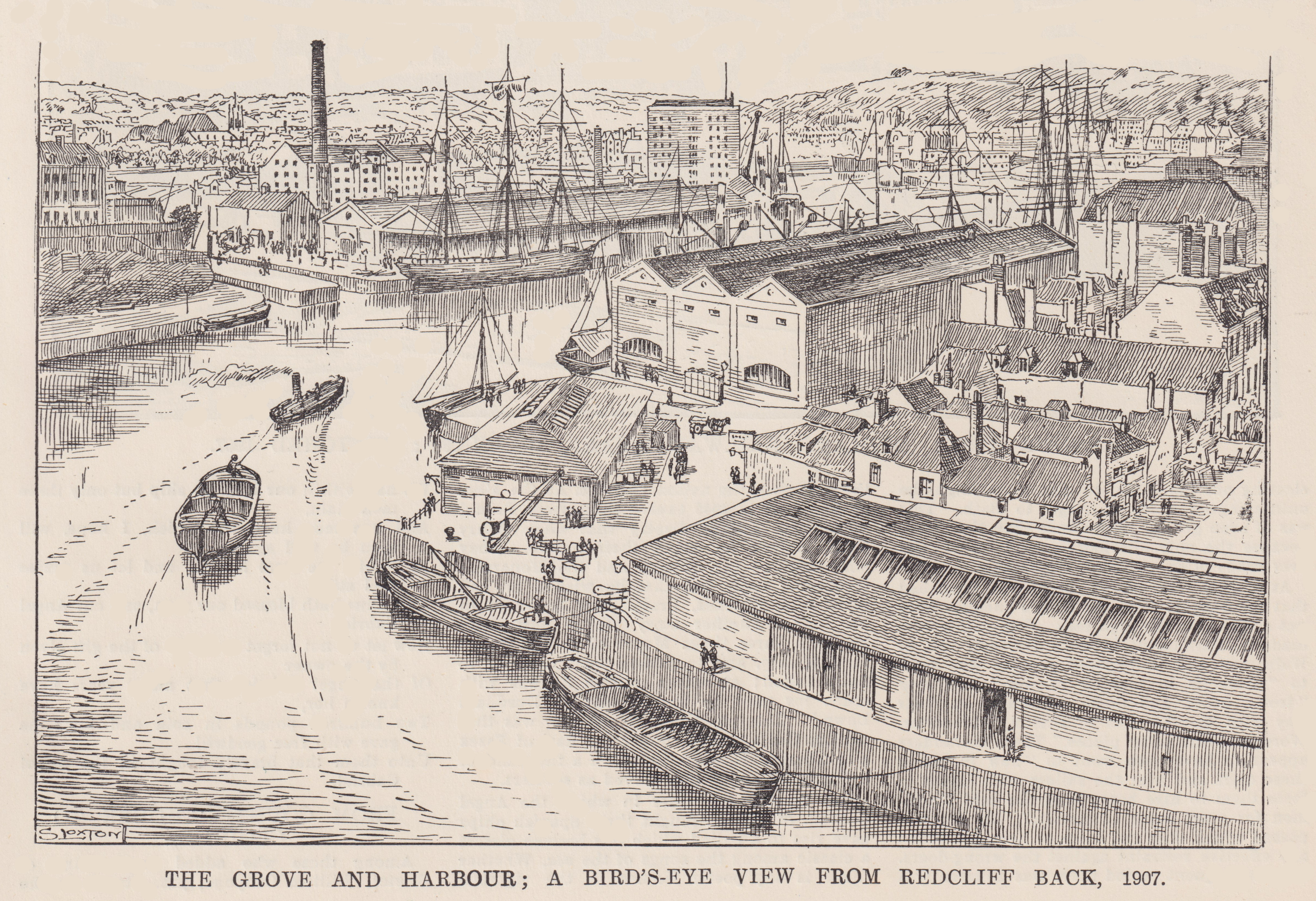
The Grove, Bristol harbour, 1907

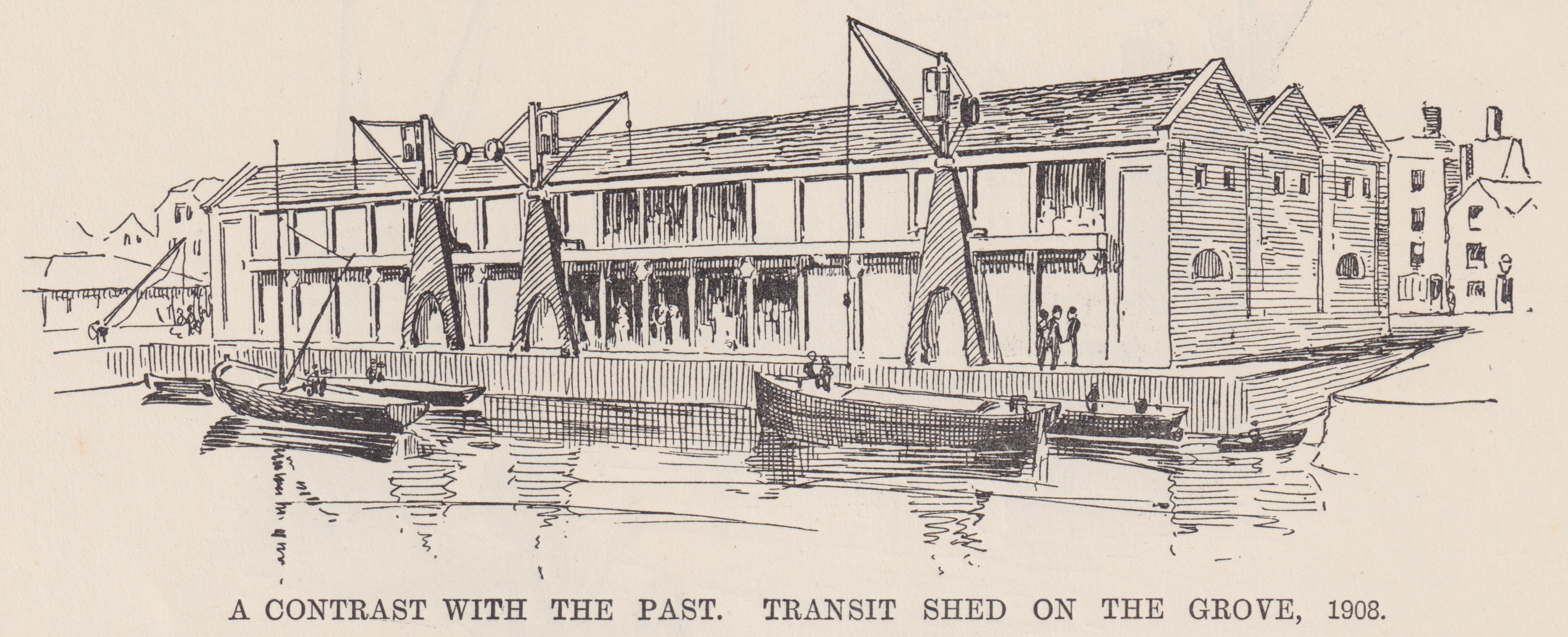
Transit Shed on the Grove, 1908

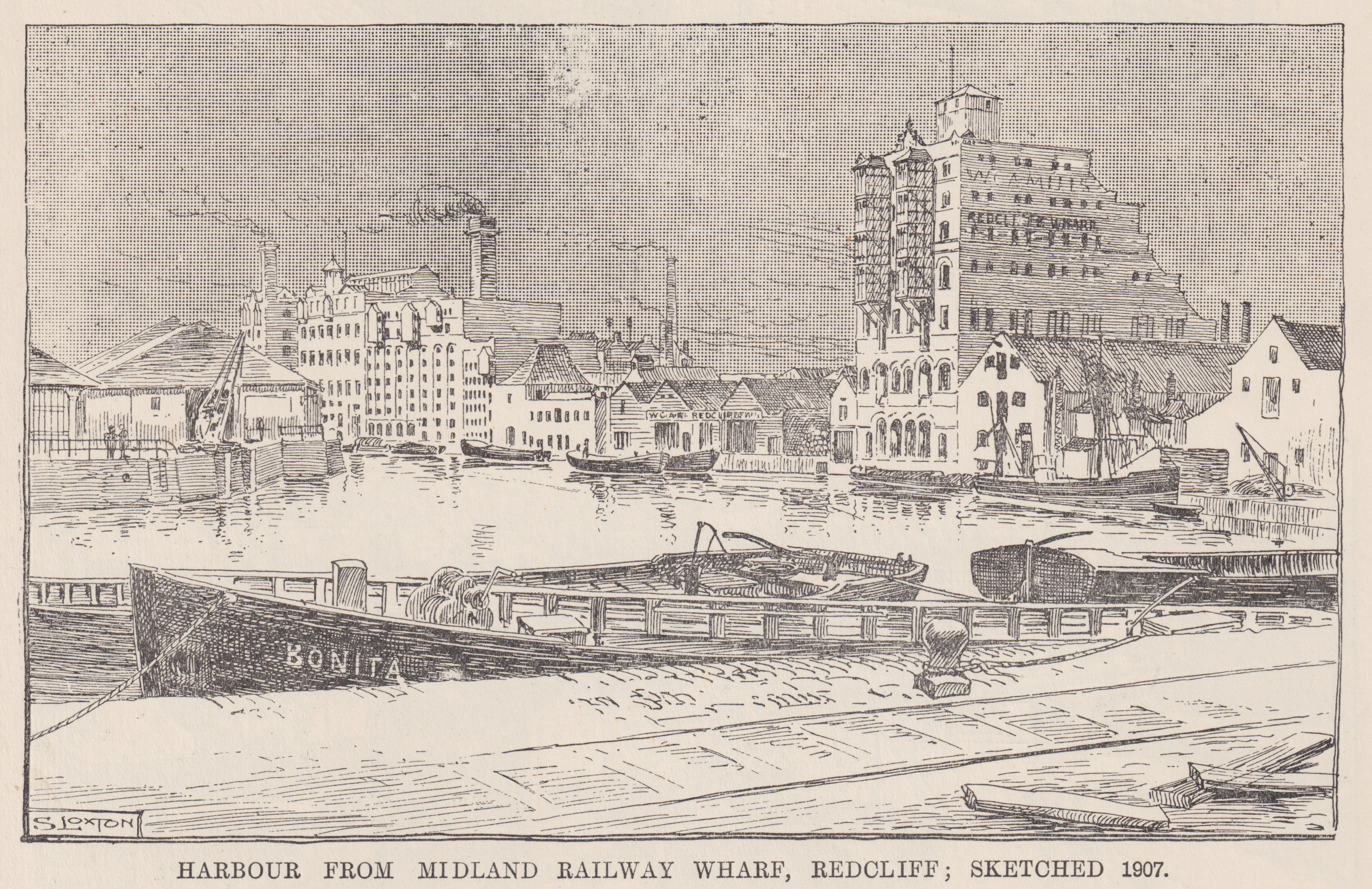
Bristol Harbour from Redcliffe Back, 1907

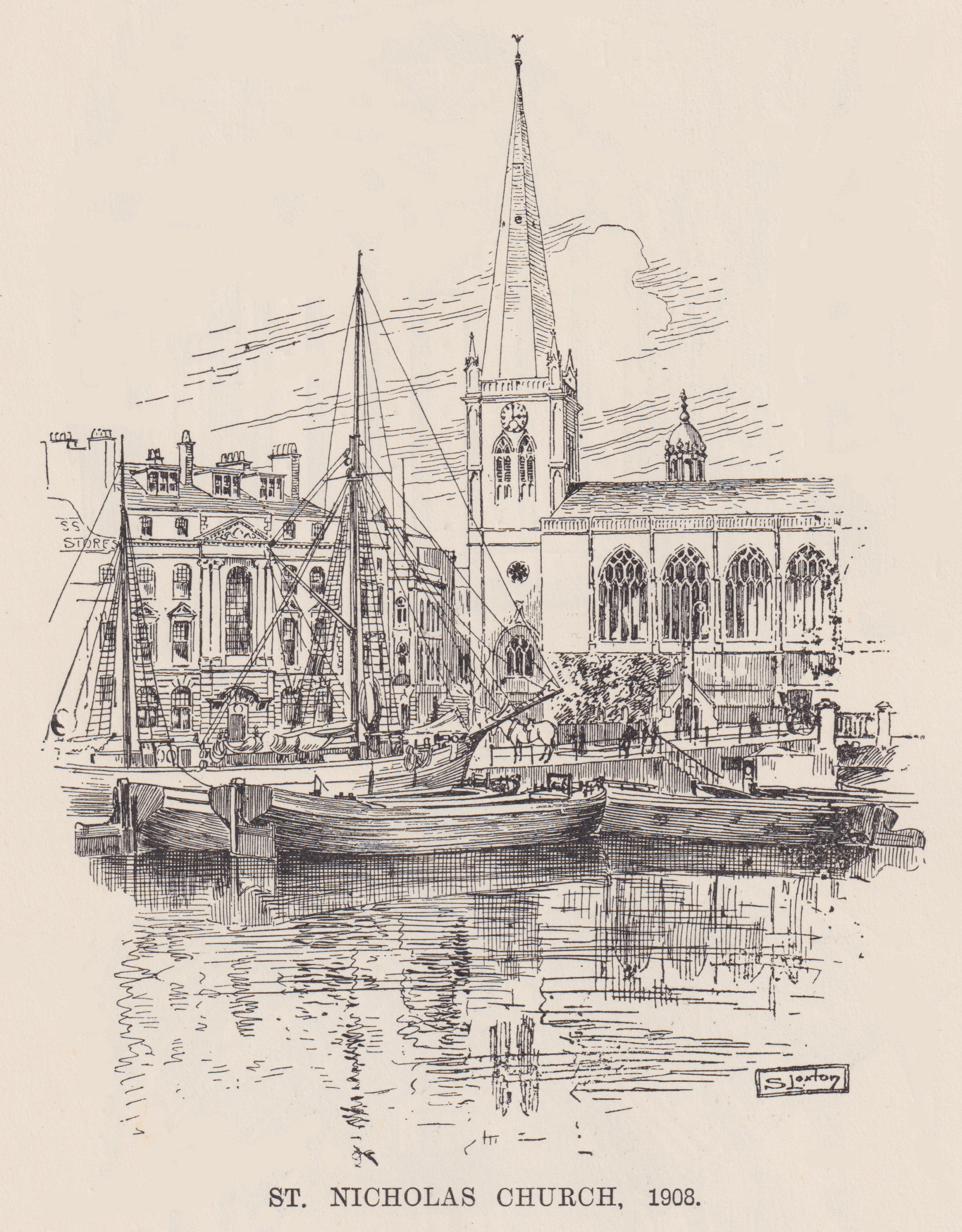
St Nicholas Church, 1908

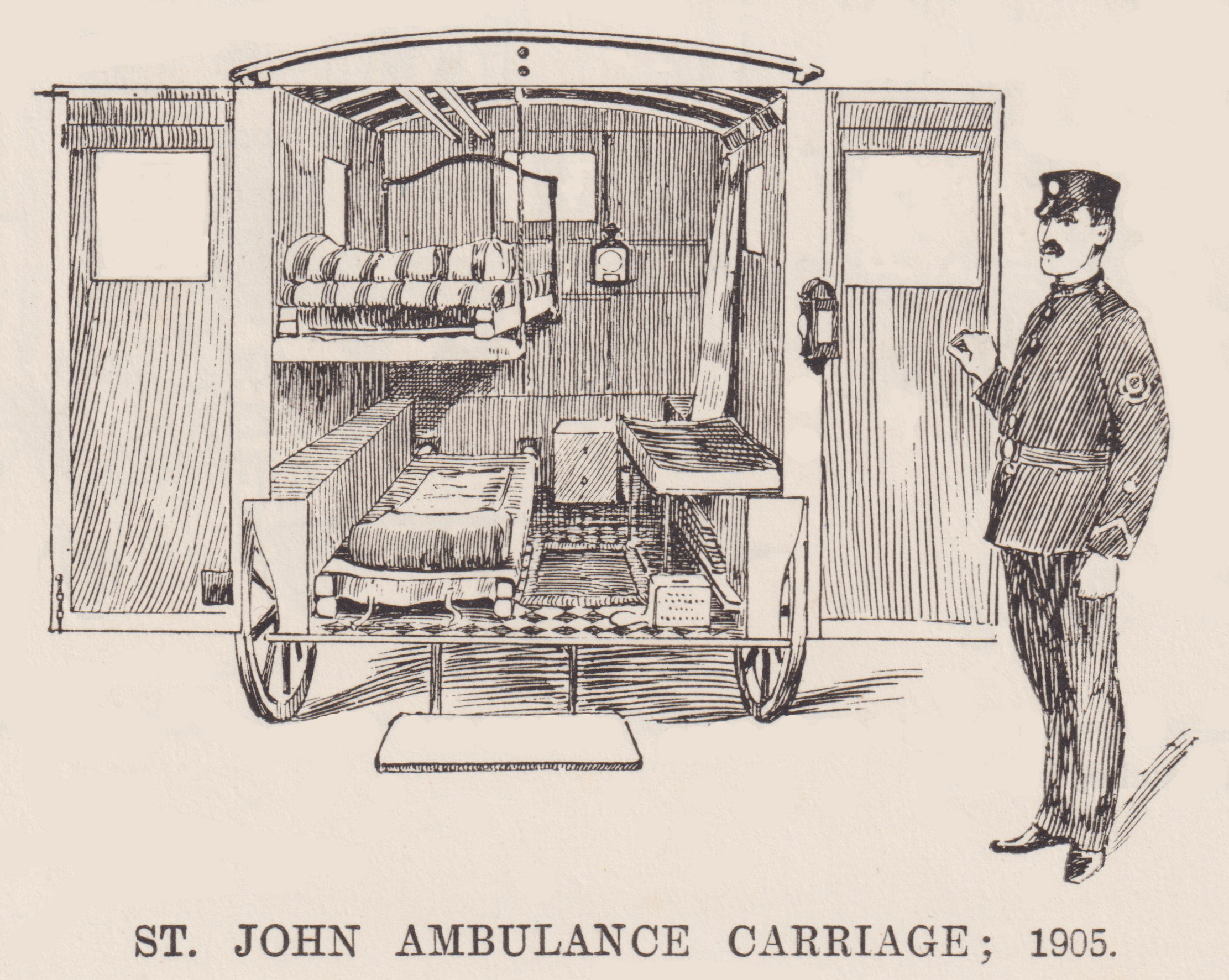
St John's Ambulance carriage, 1905

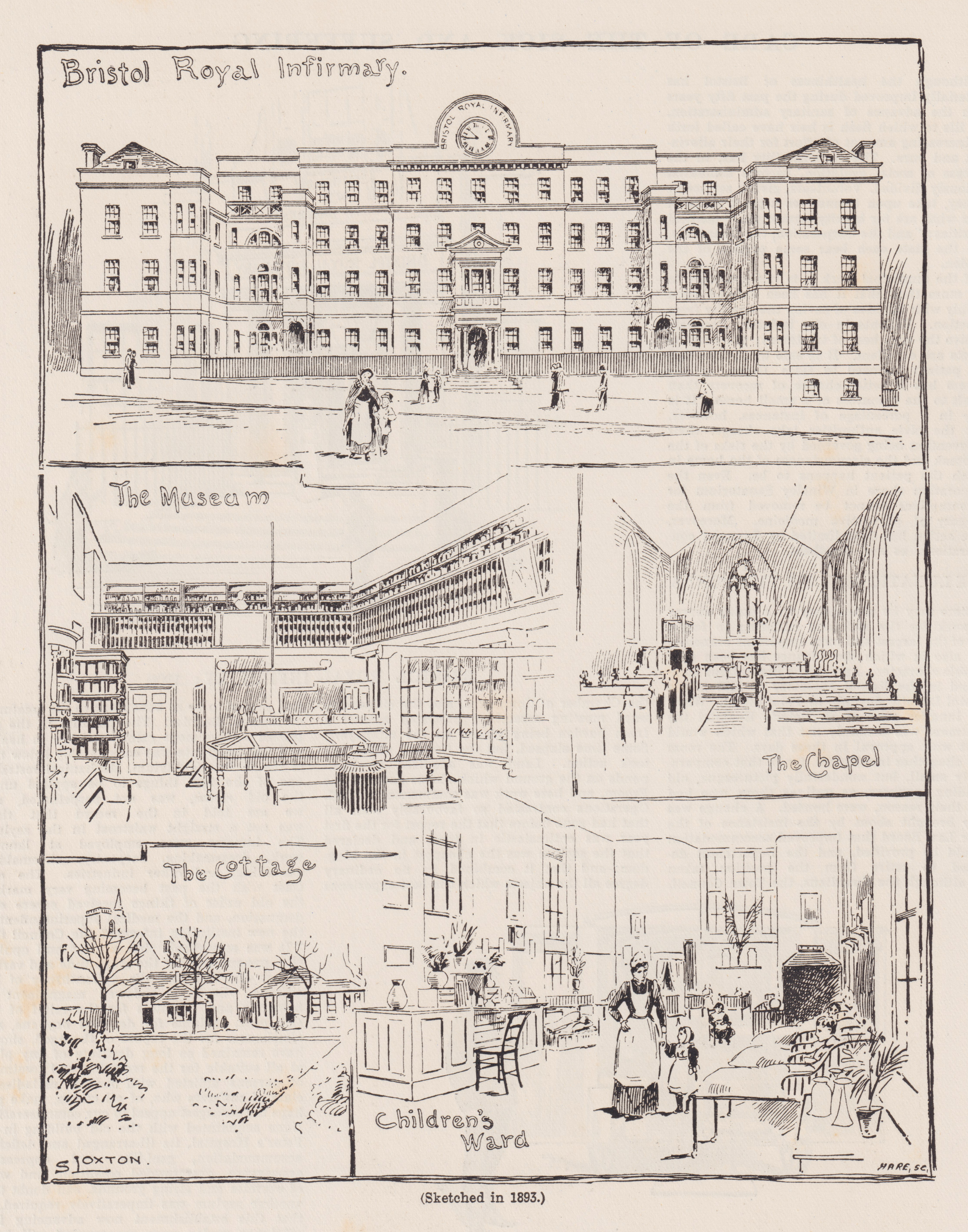
Bristol Royal Infirmary, 1893

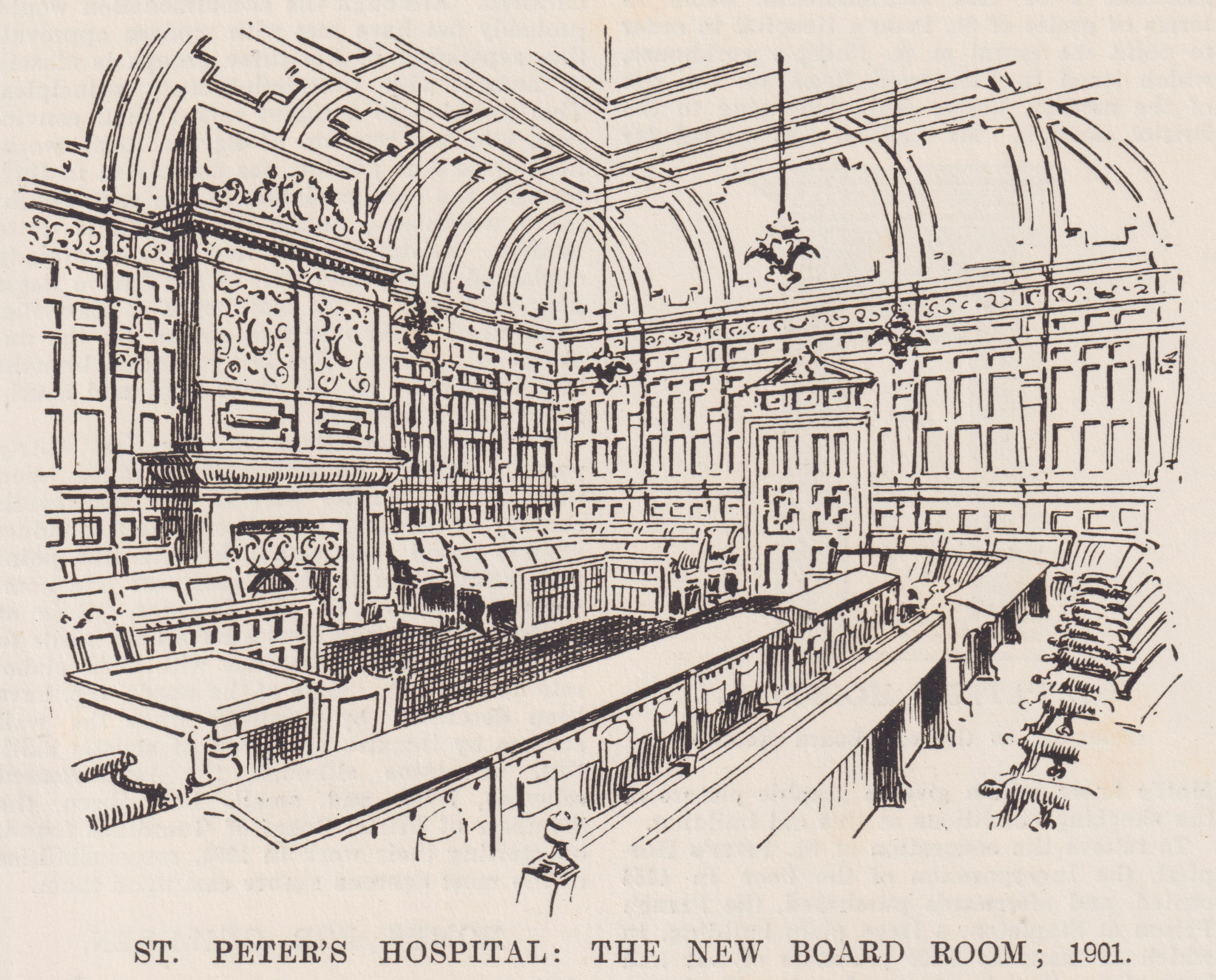
St Peter's Hospital, new board room, 1901

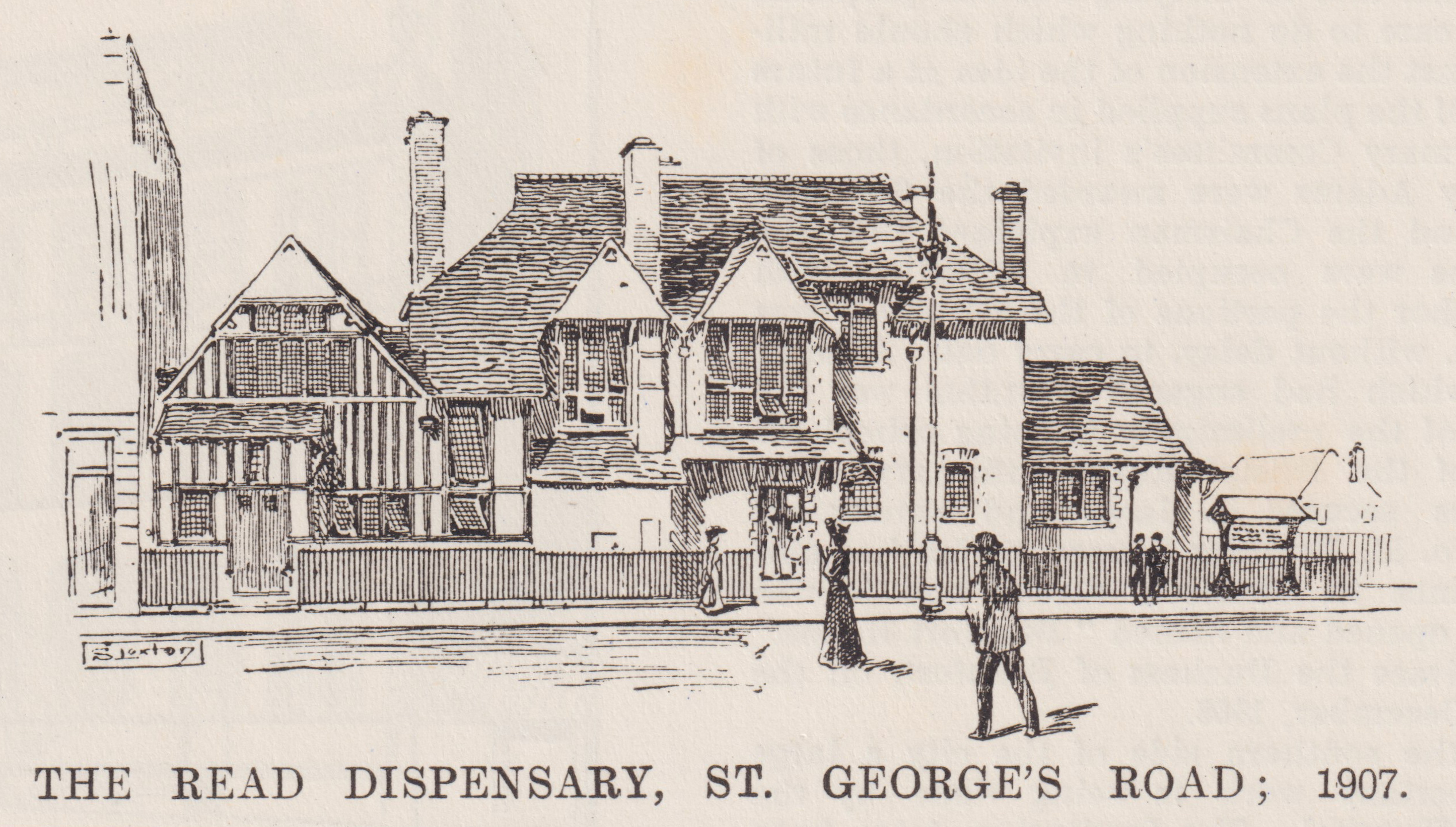
The Read Dispensary, 1907

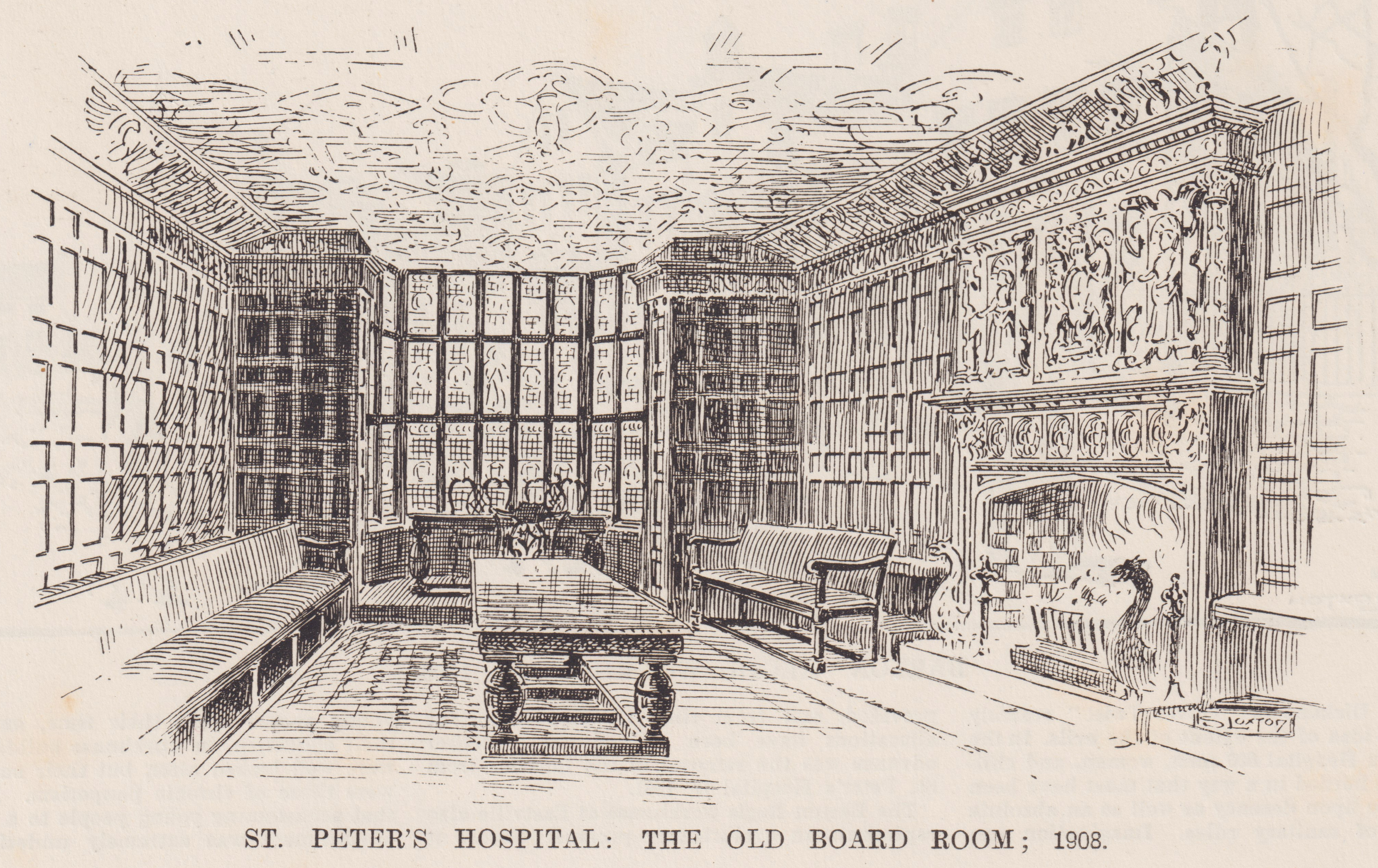
St Peter's Hospital, Old Board Room, 1908

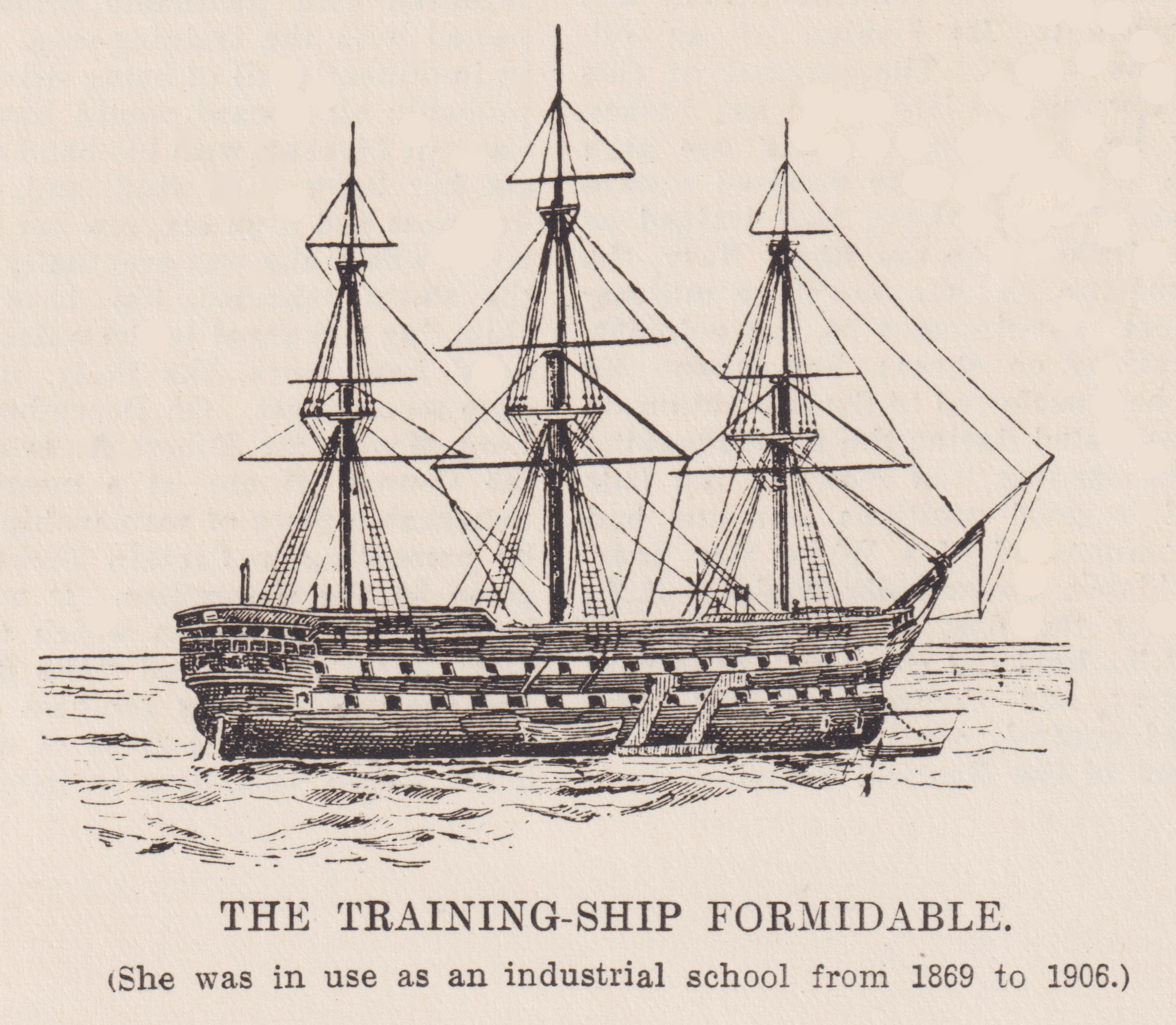
Training-ship Formidable, Portishead, 1906

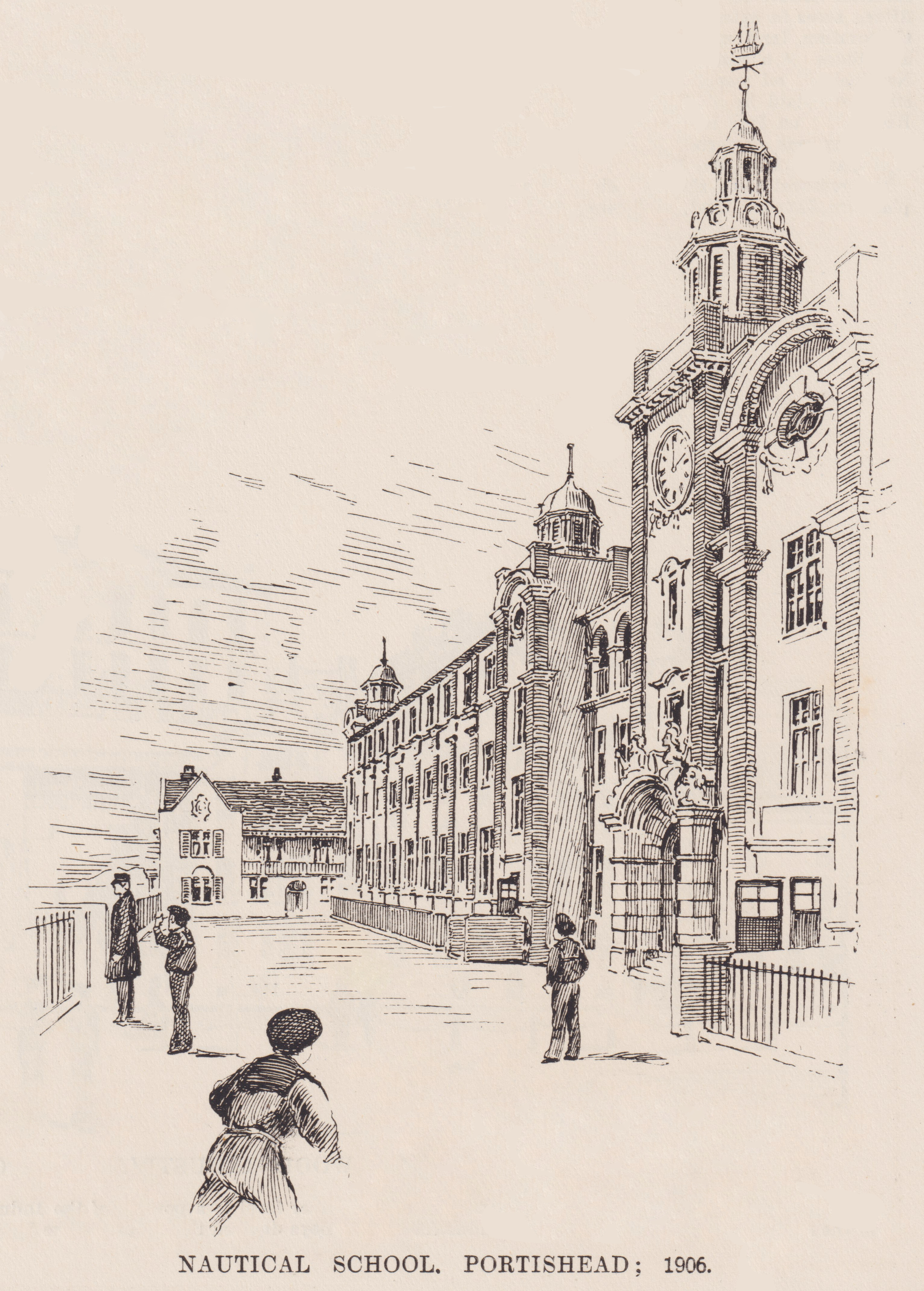
Nautical School, Portishead 1906

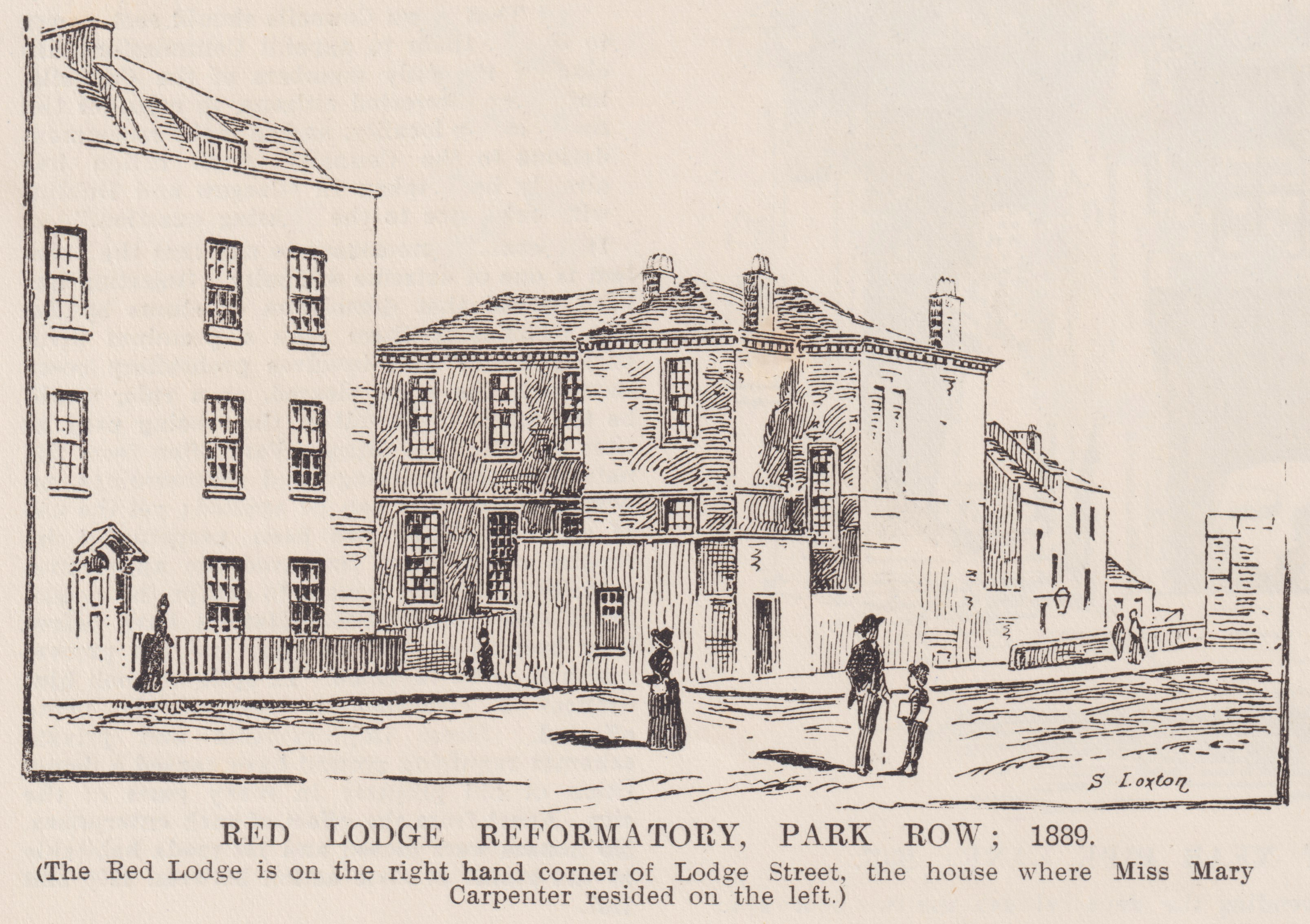
Red Lodge Reformatory, 1889

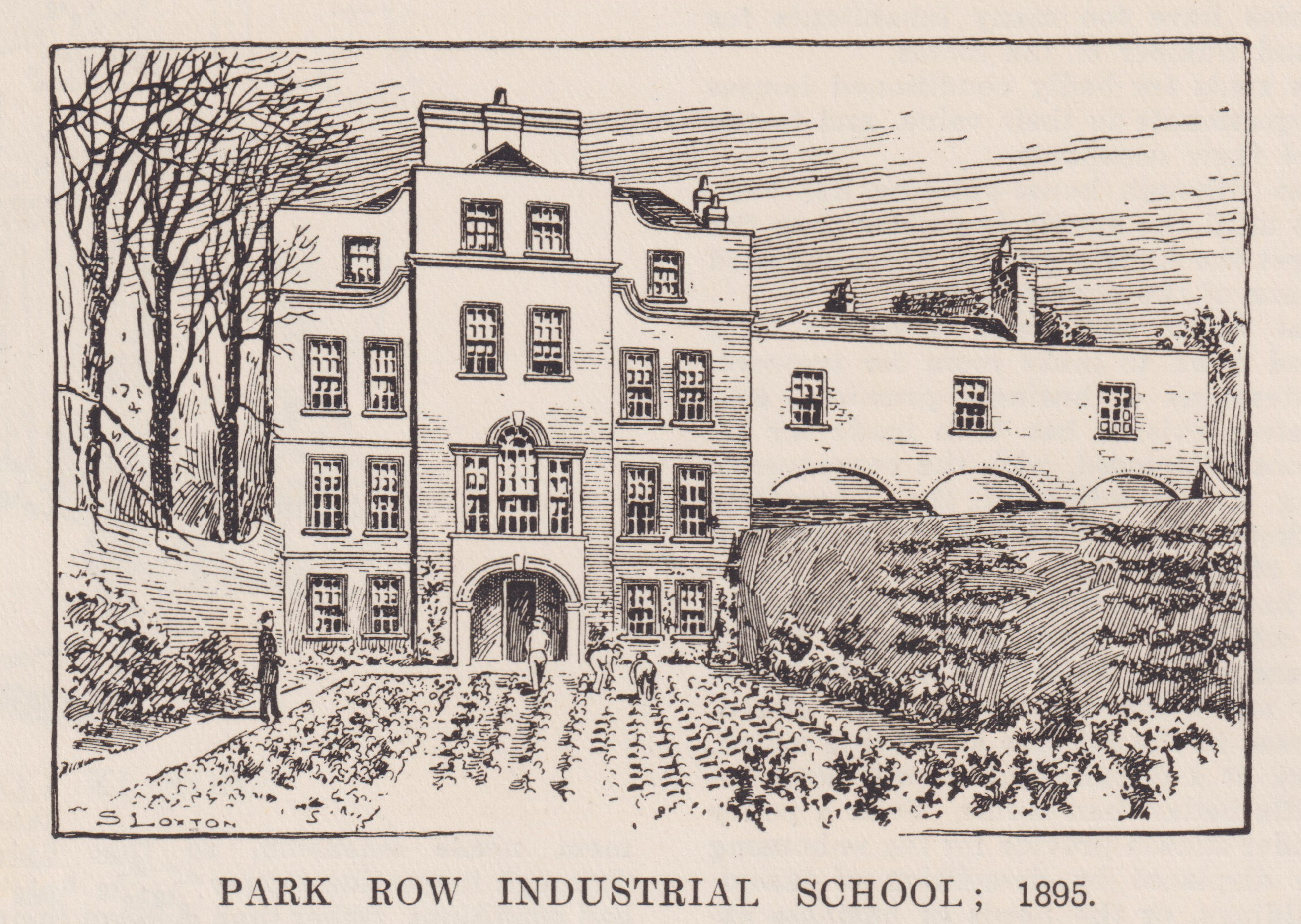
Park Row Industrial School 1895

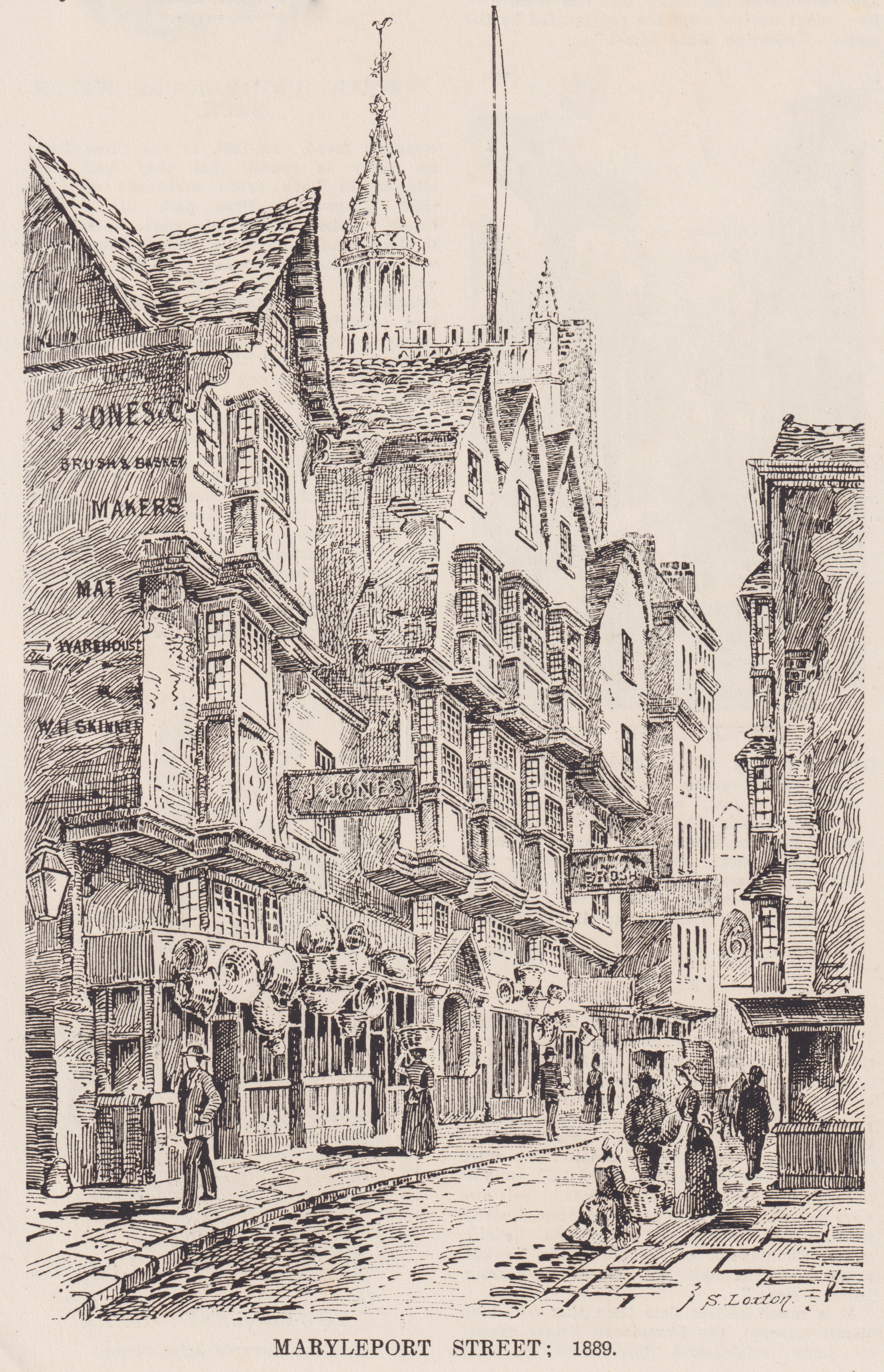
Mary-le-port Street, 1889

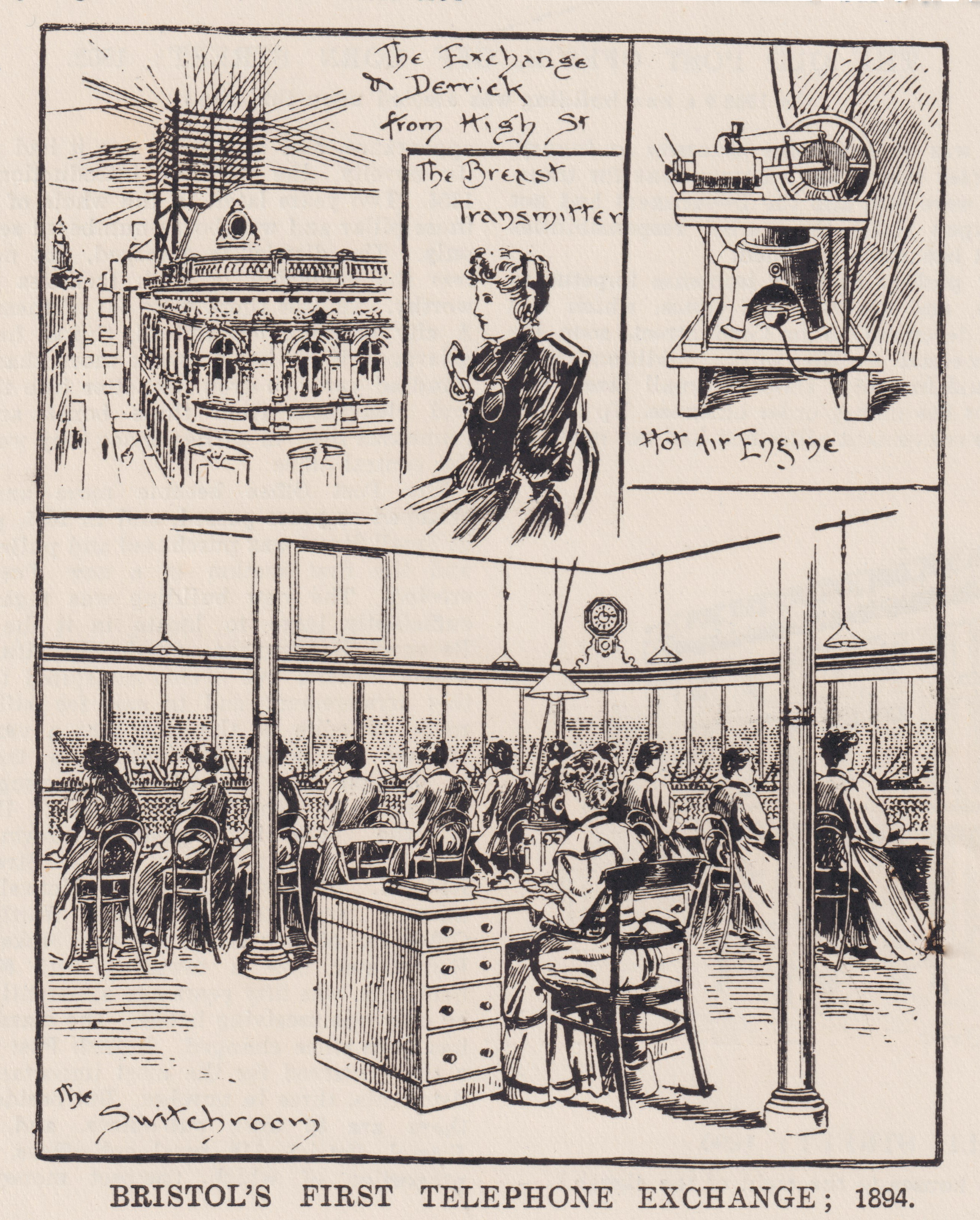
Bristol Telephone Exchange, 1894

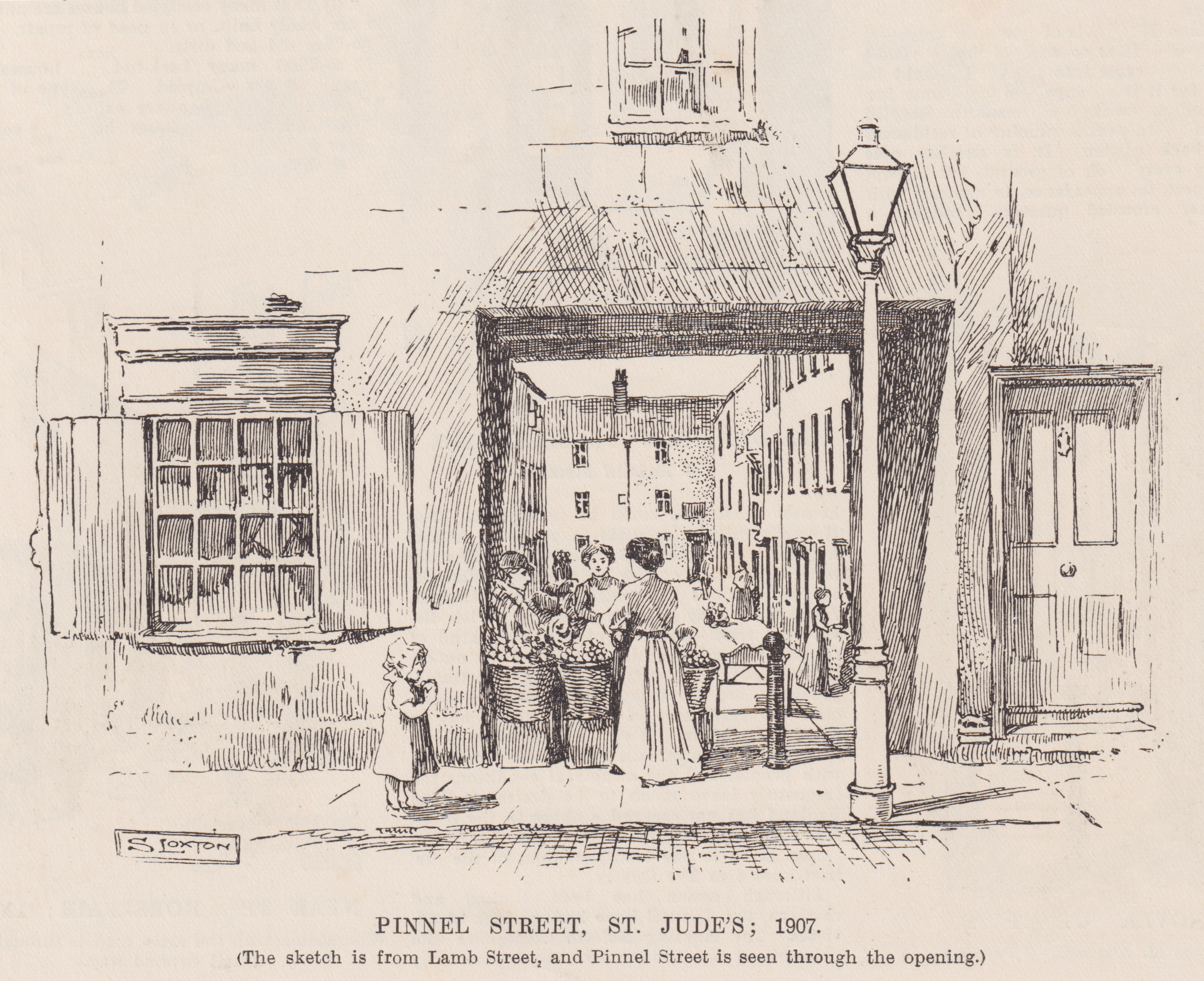
Pinnel Street, St Judes, 1907

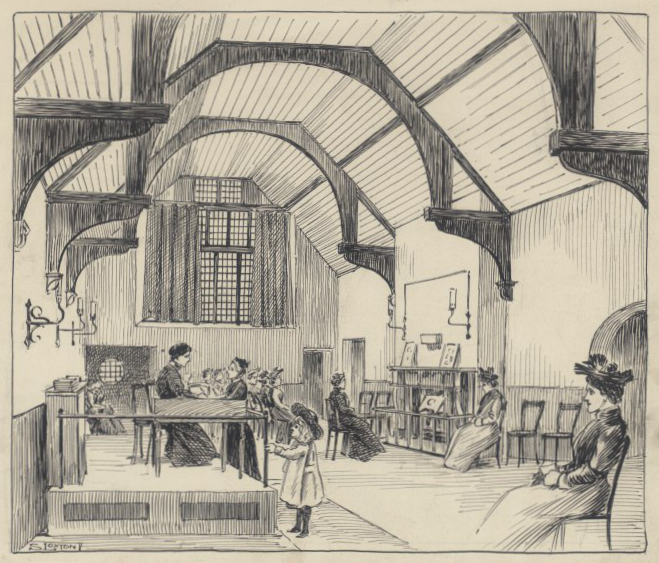
The Read Dispensary, interior, 1907

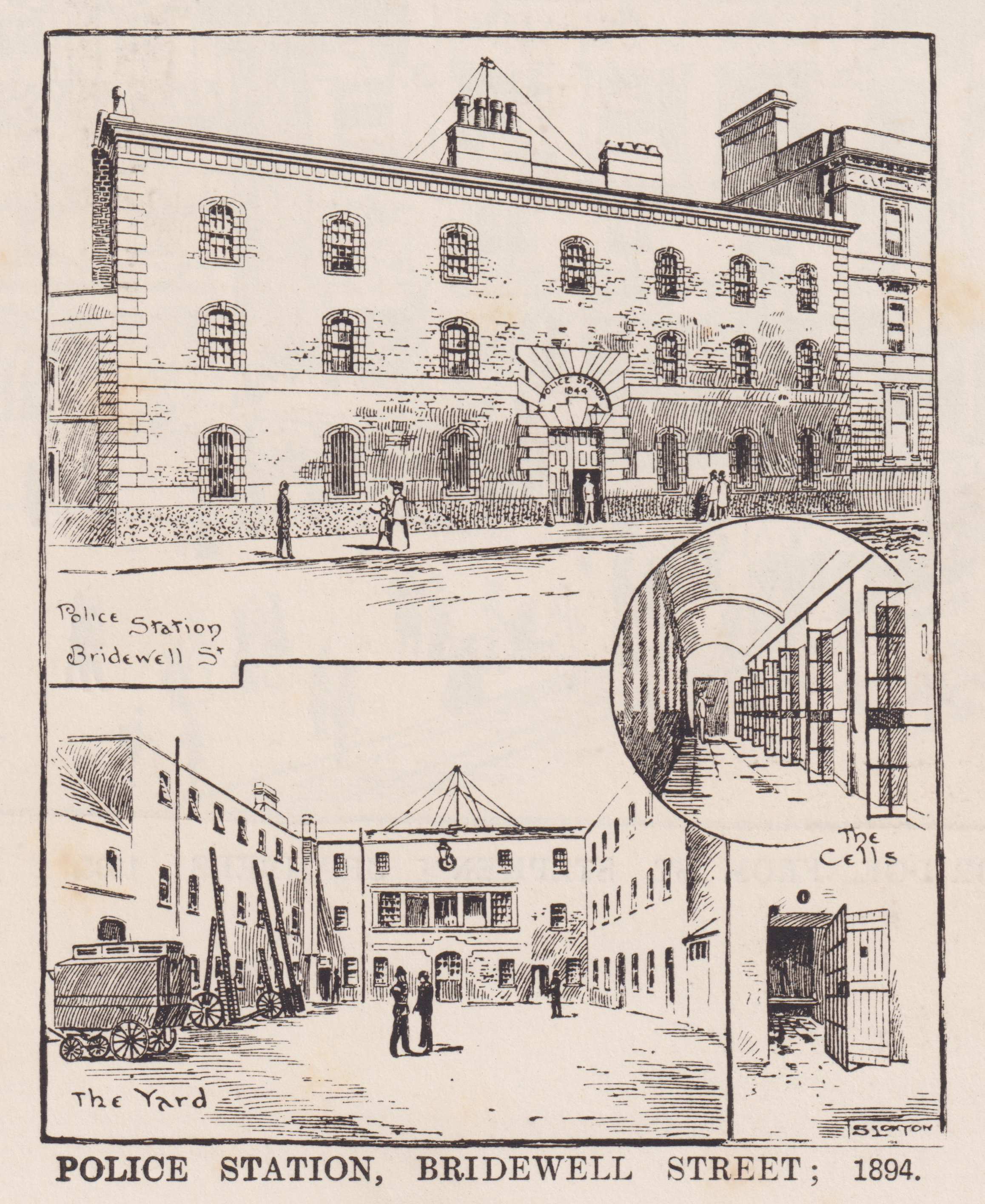
Bridewell Street police station, 1894

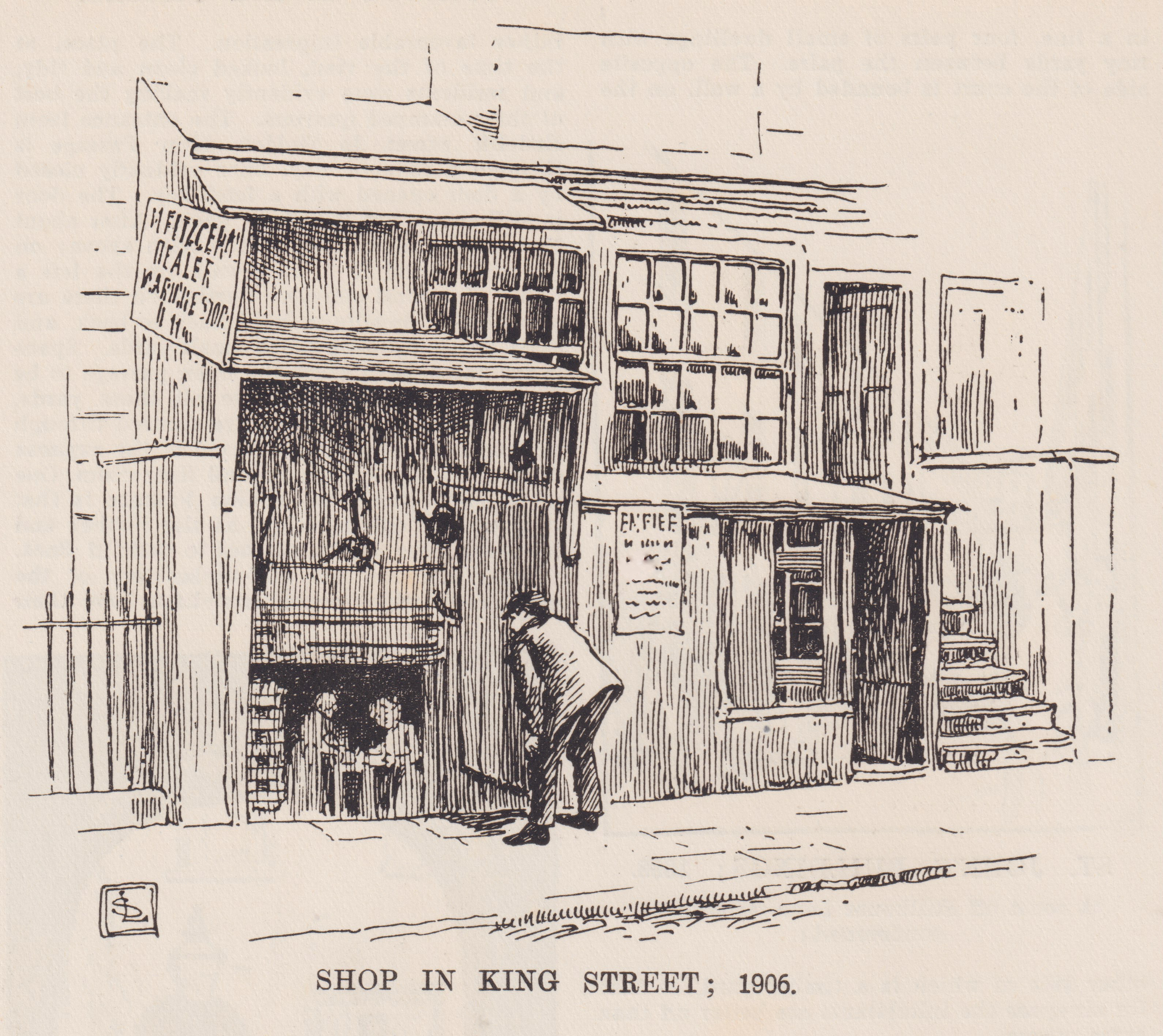
Shop in King's Street, 1906

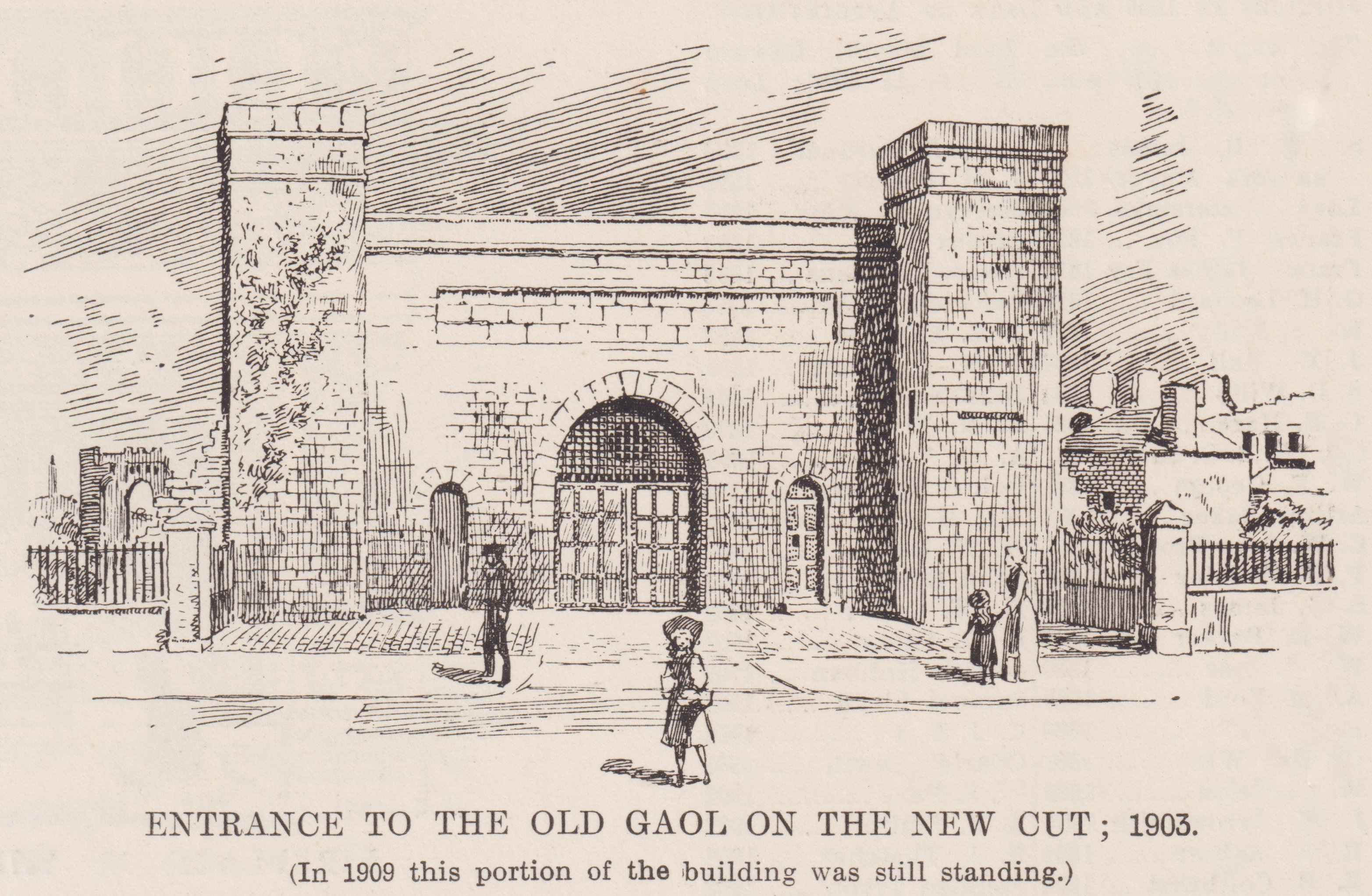
Gaol on the New Cut, 1903

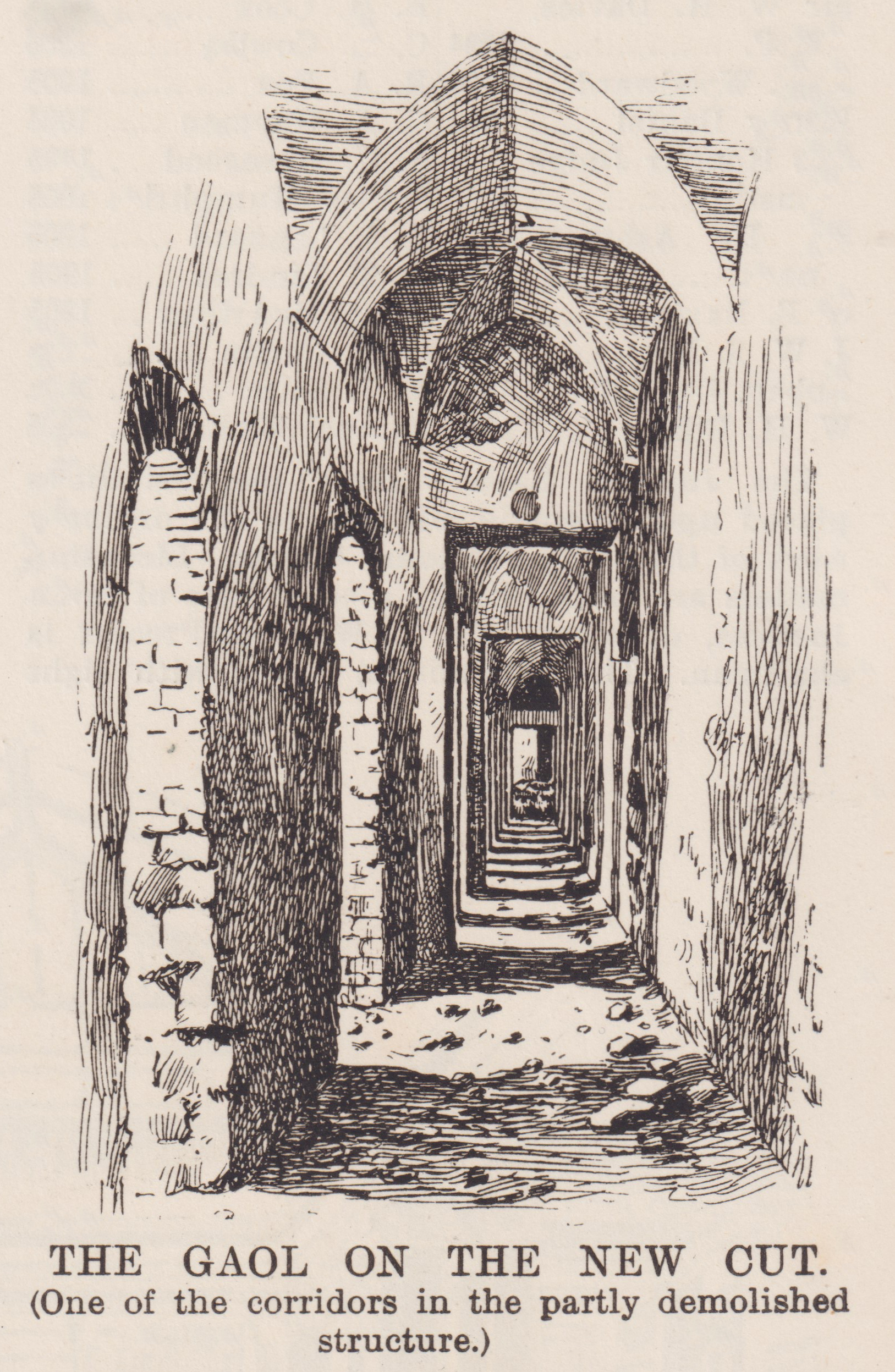
Gaol on the New Cut, interior, 1908

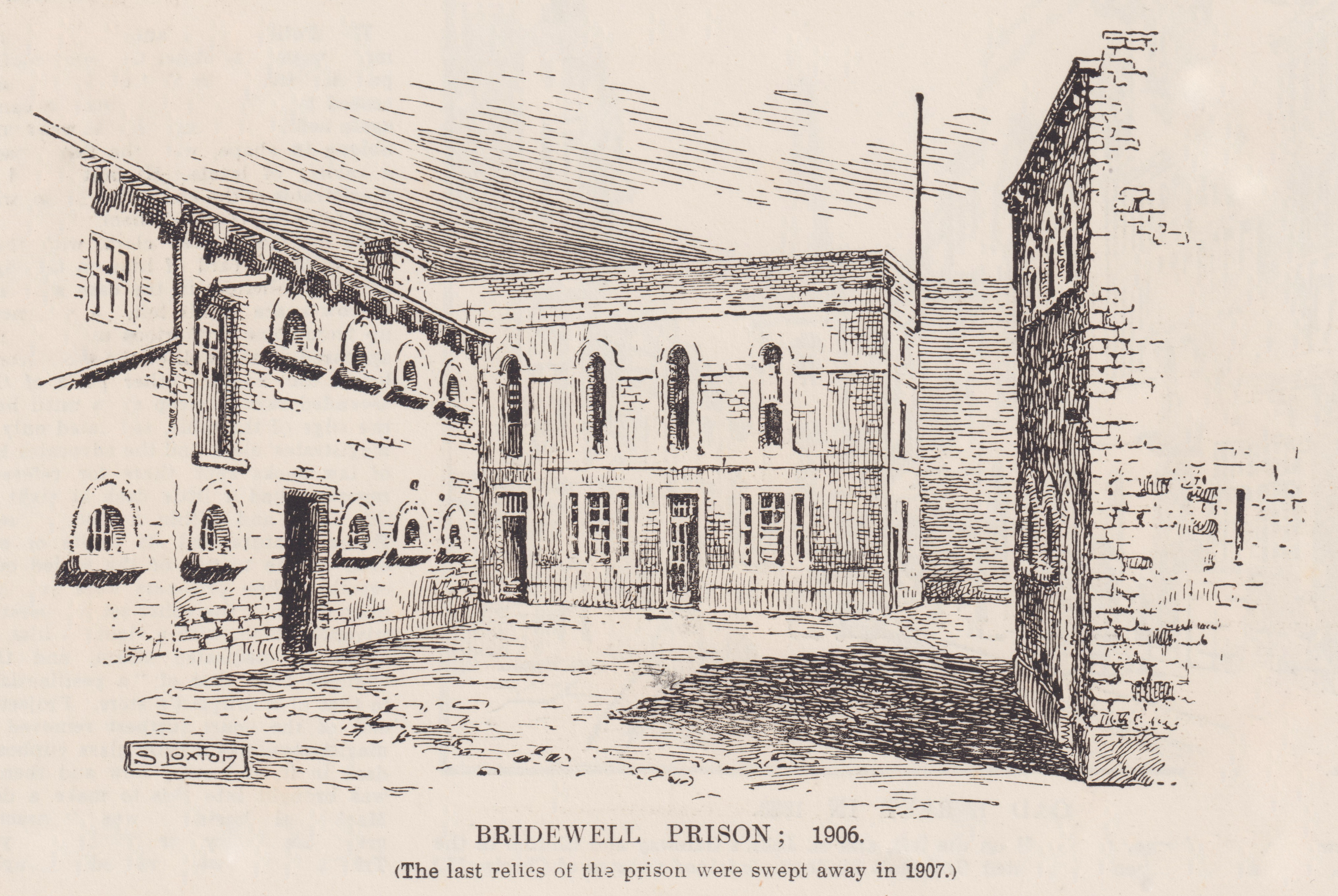
Bridewell Prison, 1906

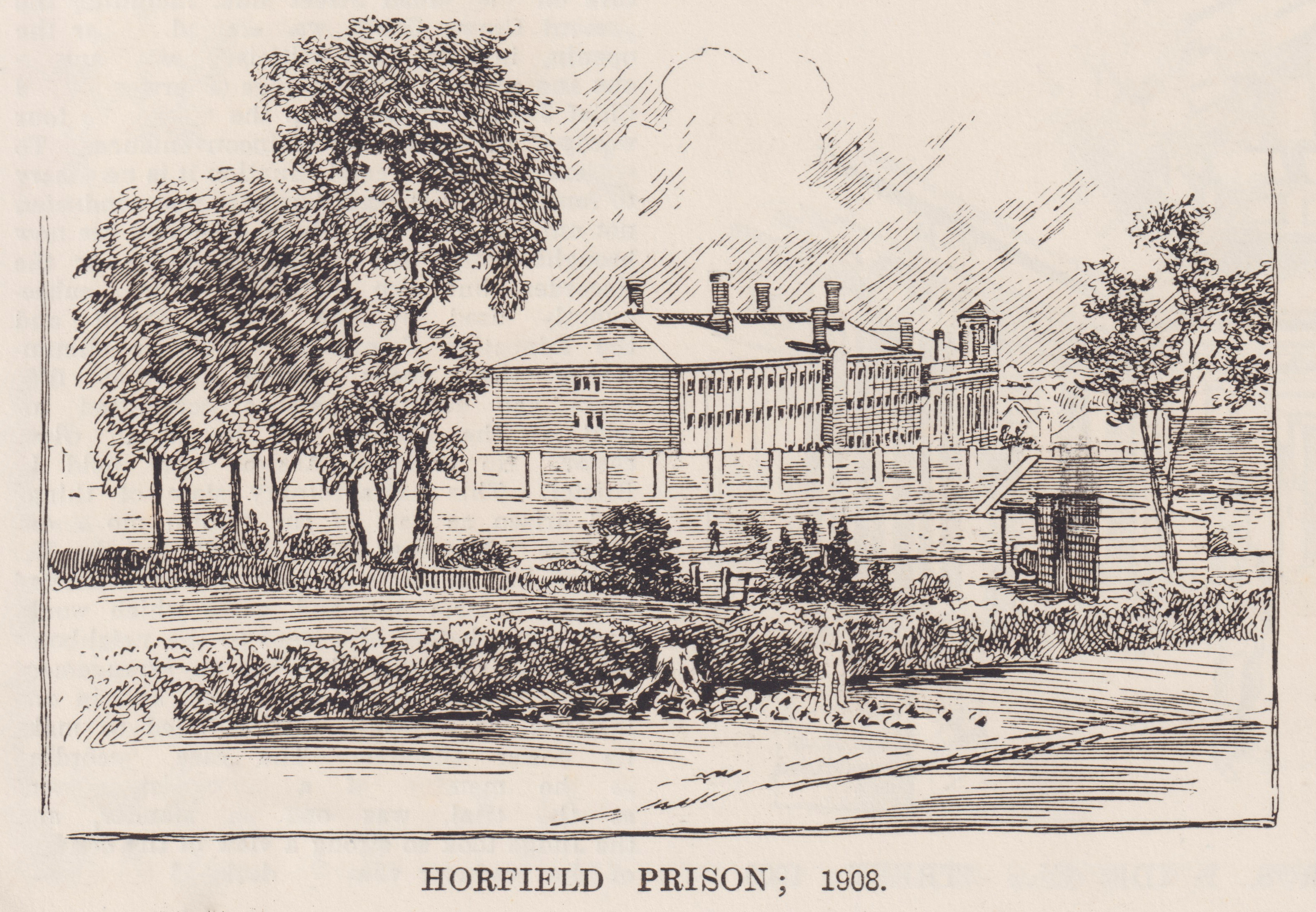
Horfield Prison, 1908

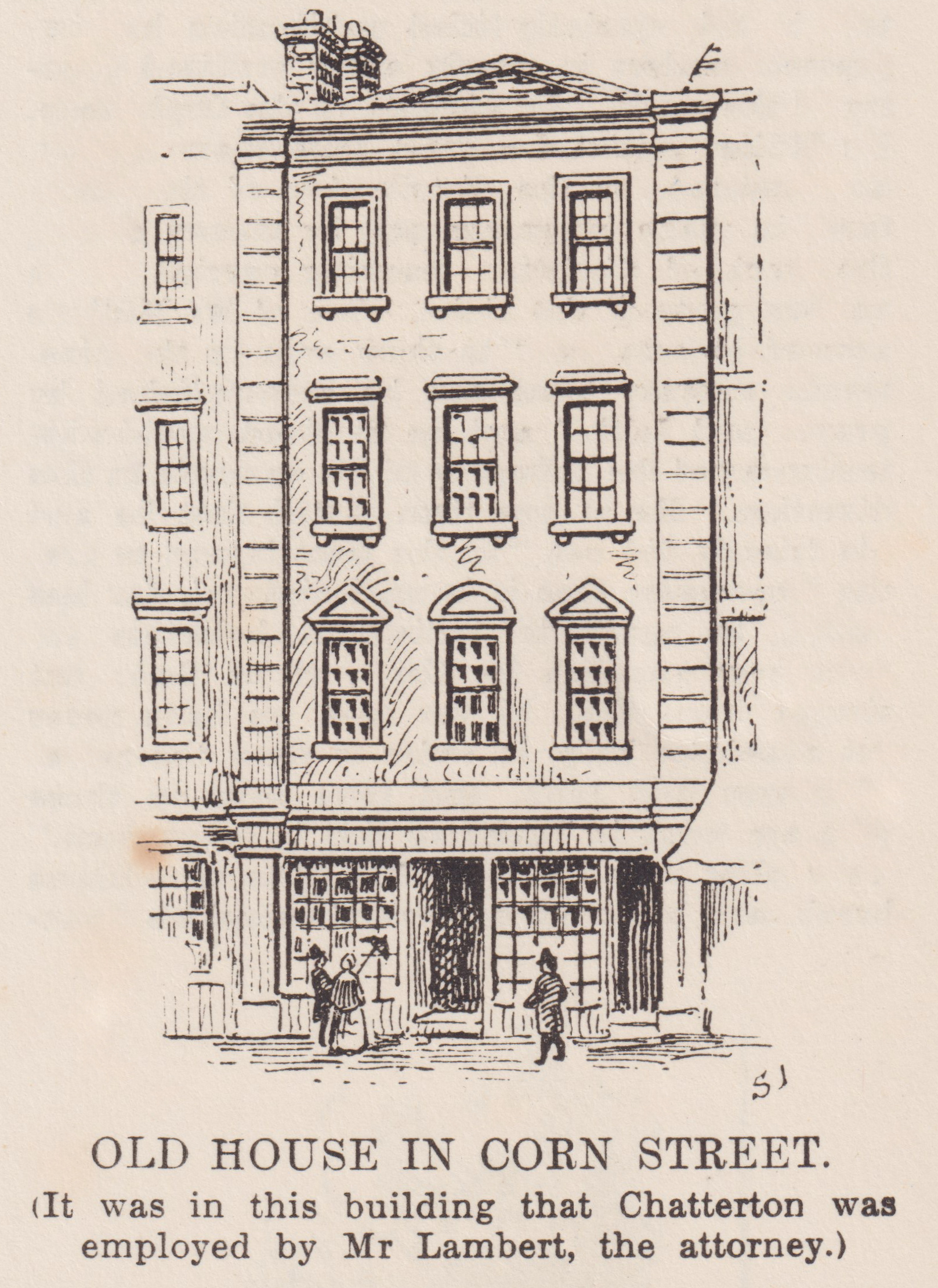
Old House in Corn Street, 1908

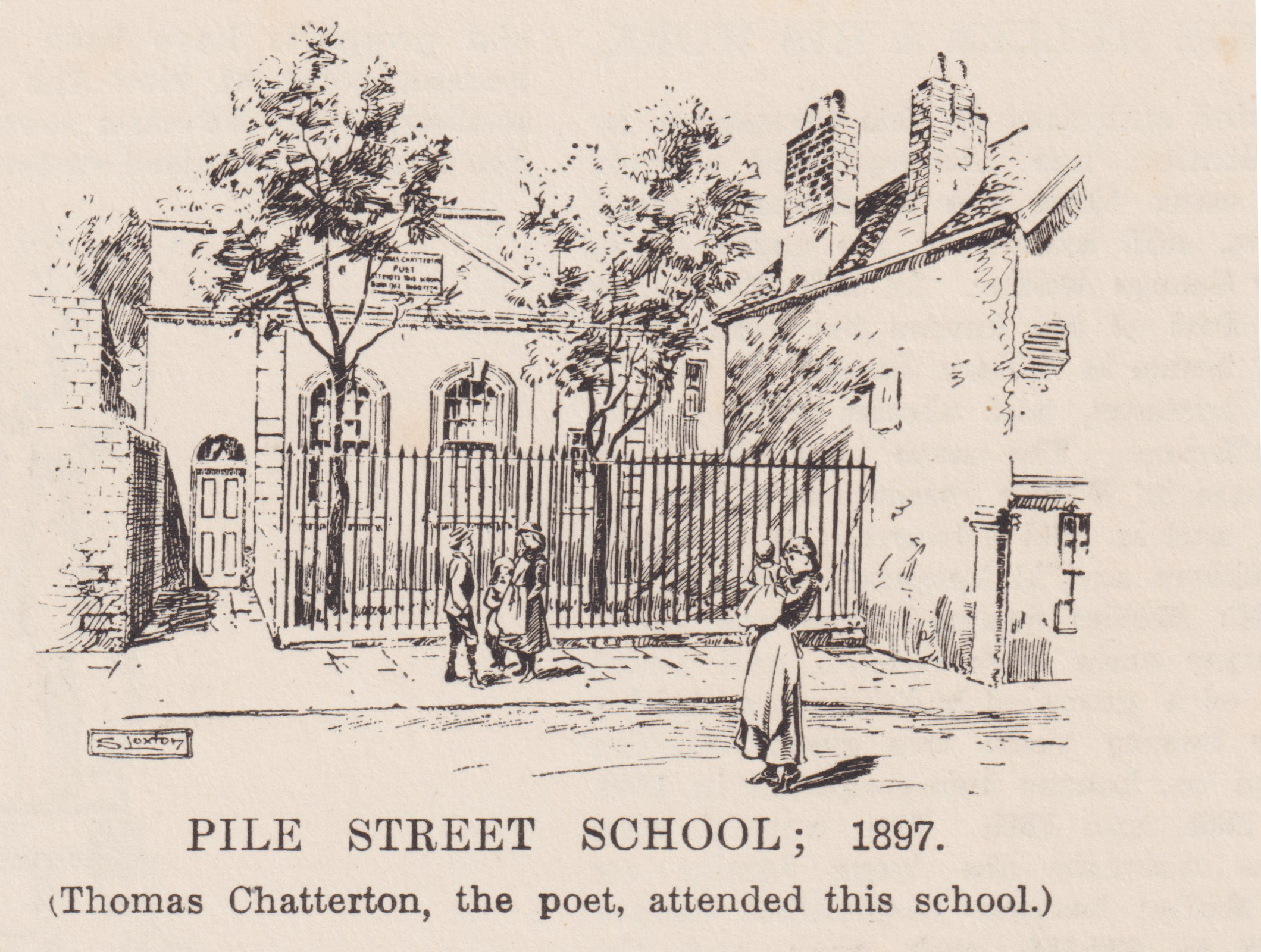
Pile Street School, 1897

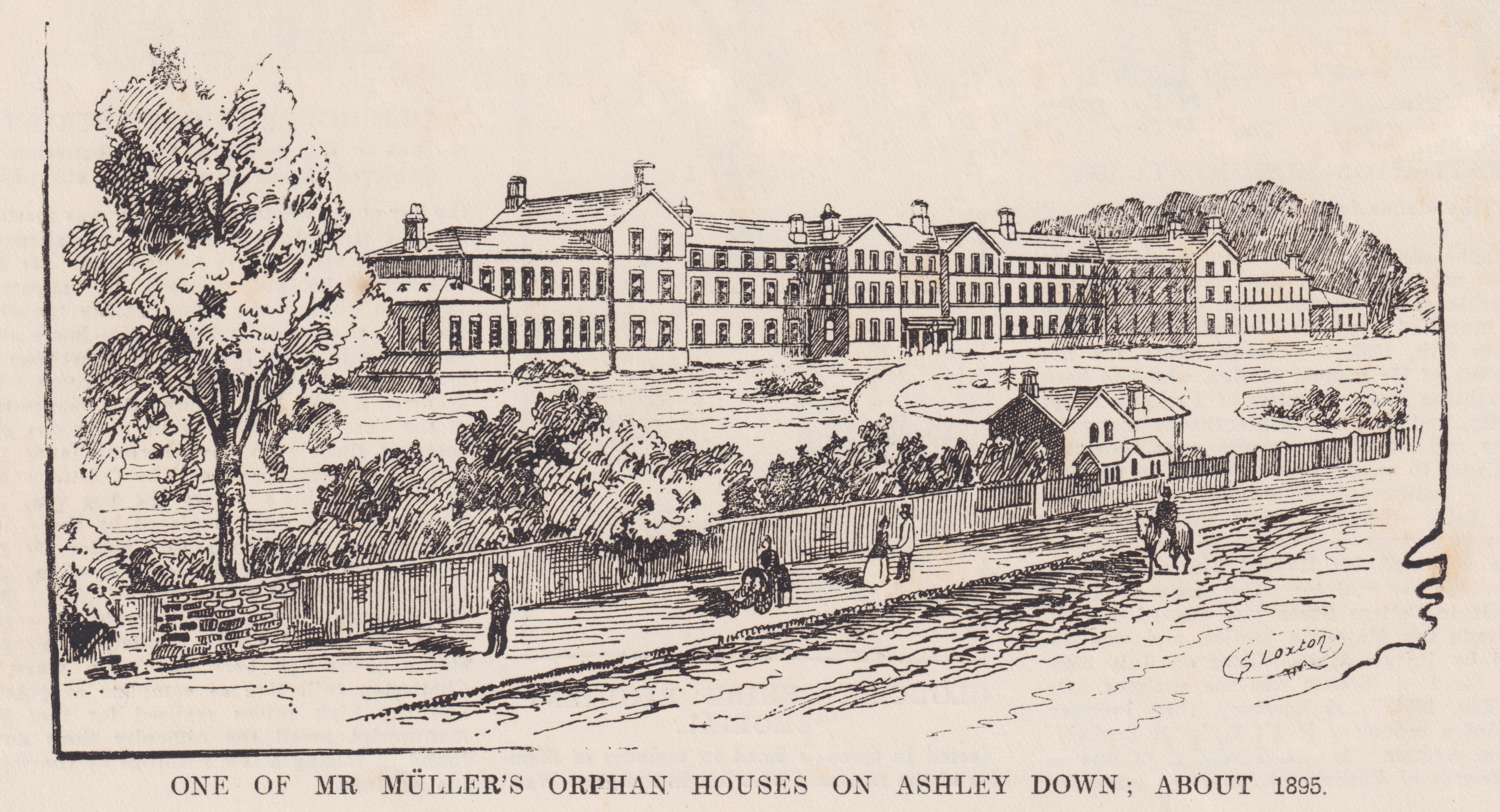
Muller's orphanage, 1895

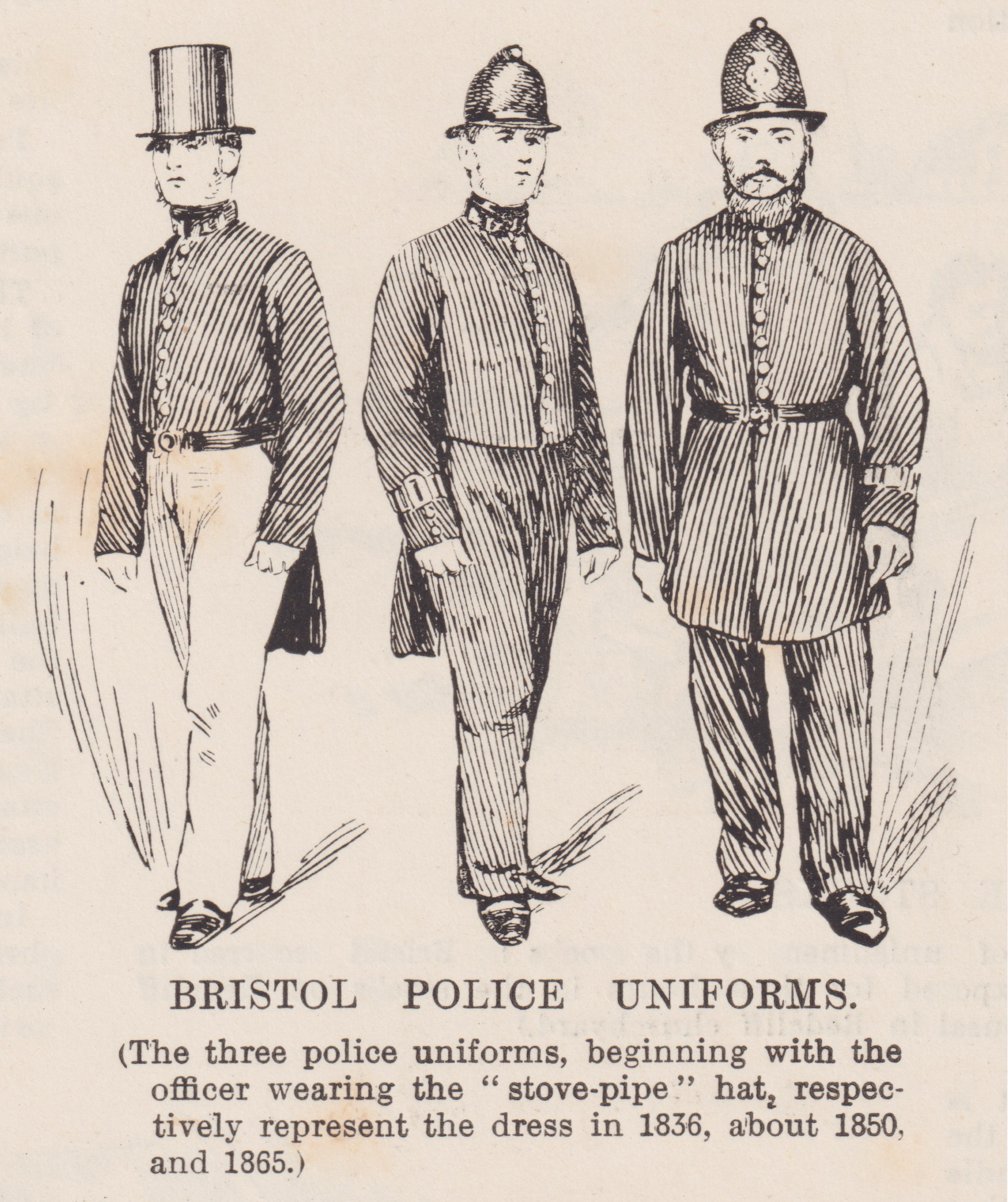
Bristol Police in 19th century

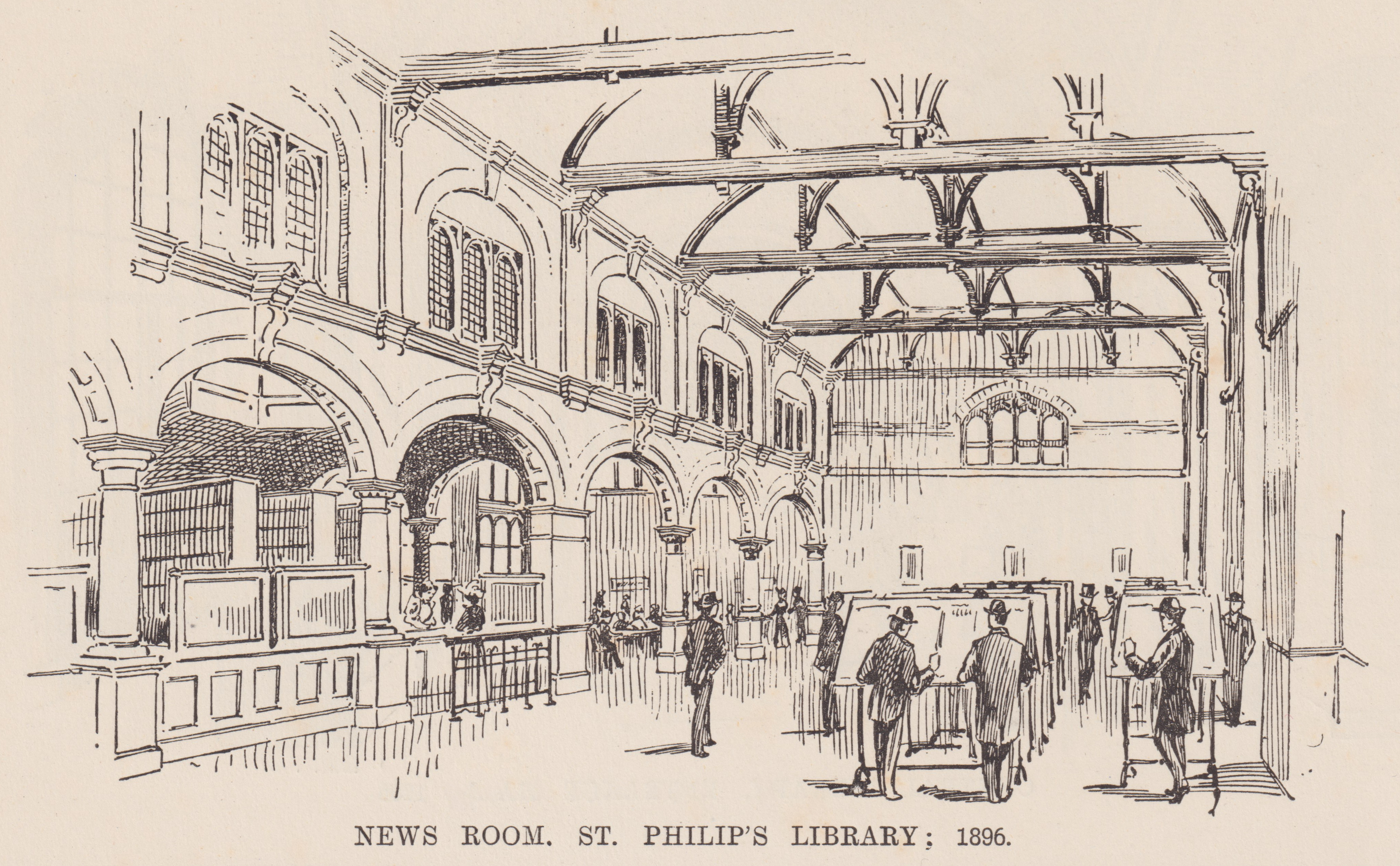
St Philip's Library News Room 1896

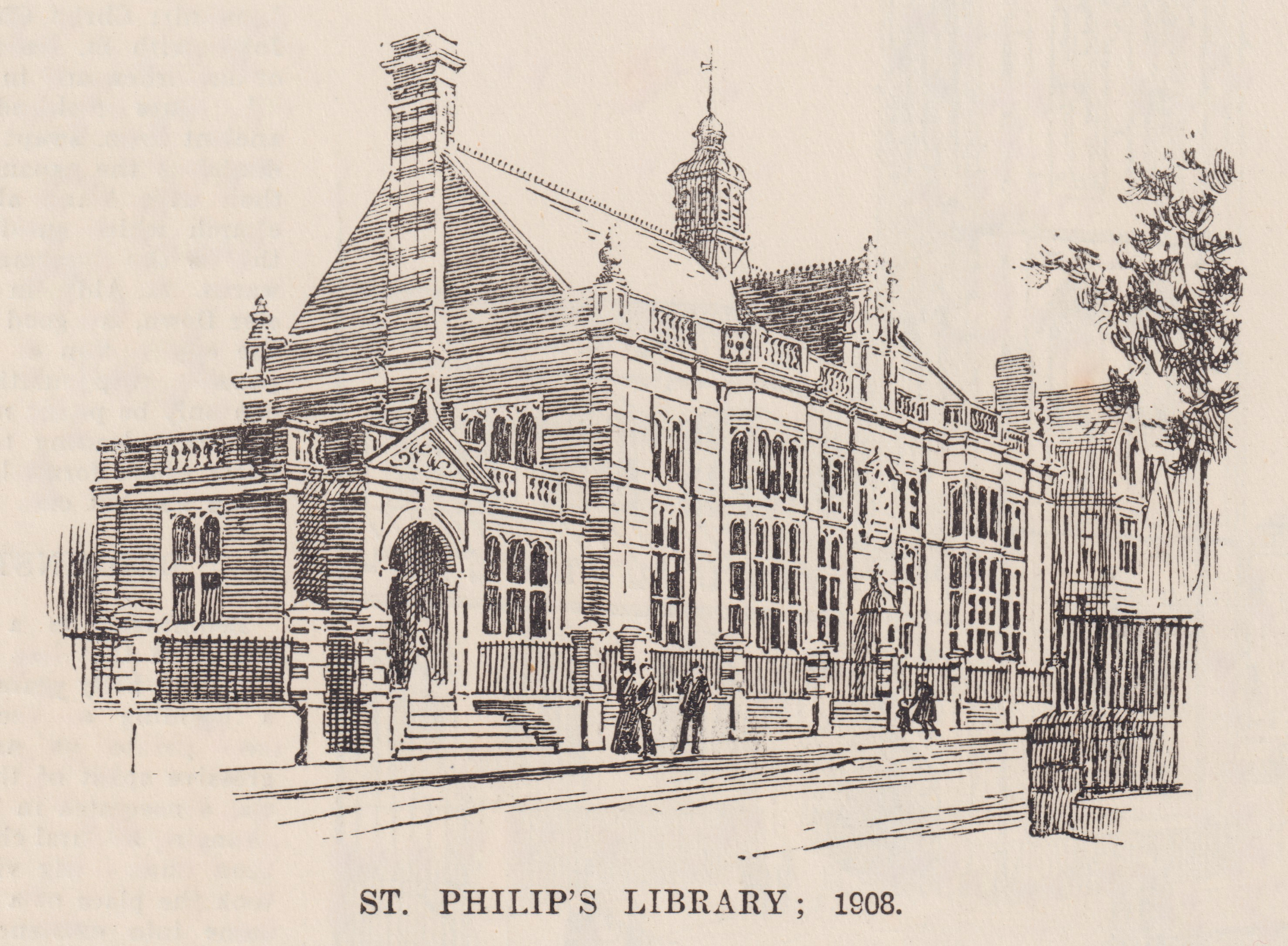
St Philip's Library, 1908
