= Stapleton Road =

Major thoroughfare in Bristol, England

Coordinates: 51.466°N 2.568°W

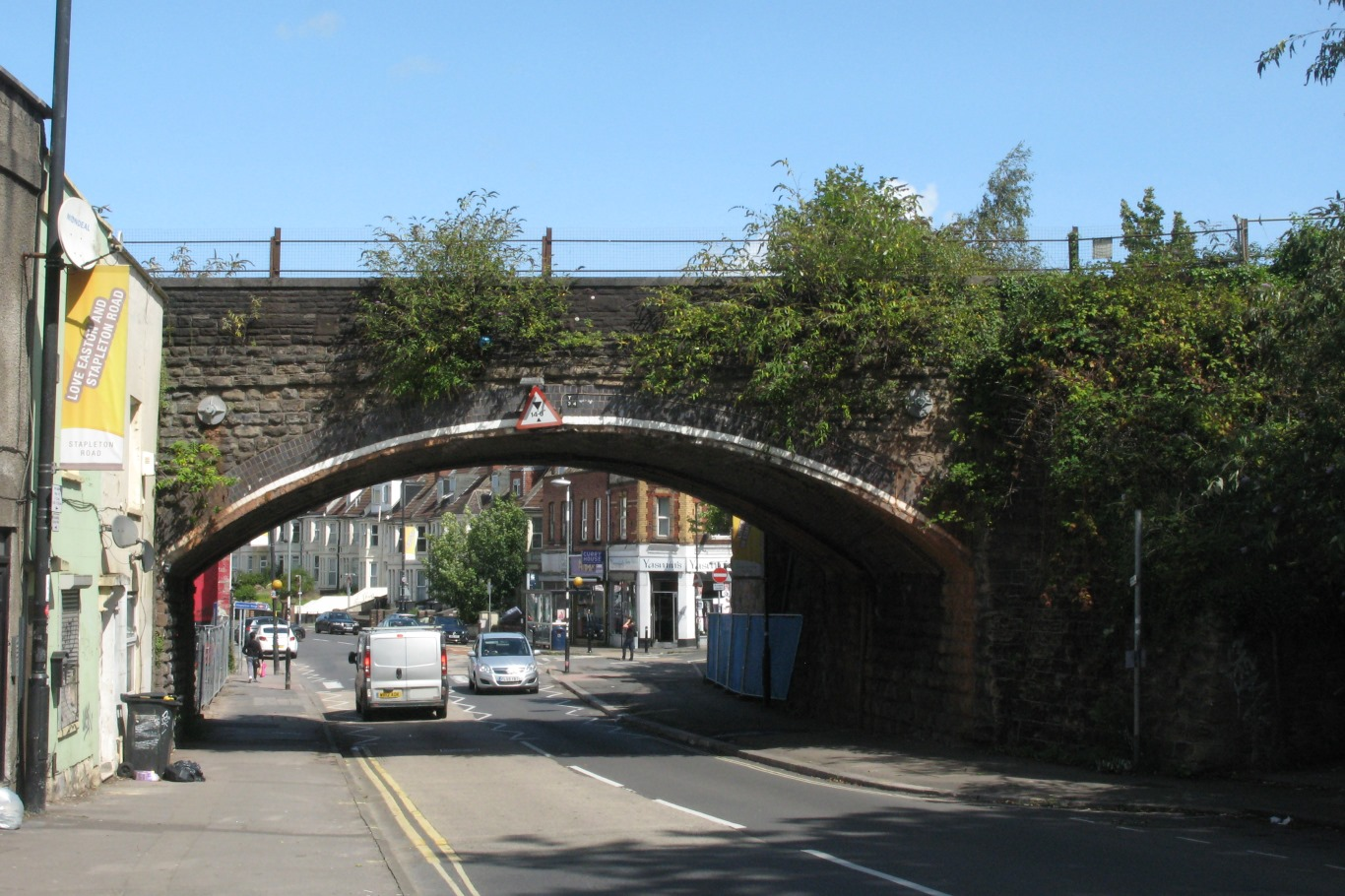
Railway bridge across Stapleton Road

Stapleton Road is a major thoroughfare in the English city of Bristol, running through the districts of Lawrence Hill and Easton. It is known for being very culturally diverse with many esoteric shops. However, since the mid 20th century it has gained a reputation for having a high crime rate.

== Route ==
The road is on the former route into Bristol from Gloucester, it becomes the B4058 at its southern end parts of which are today known as the Old Gloucester Road.

The road starts at the junction between Lawford's Gate and Trinity Road in the St Jude's area of Bristol and also marks the start of the A432. While there is still a shopping area here, today only one side of the road is mostly pre war, the other side has mostly now housing estates. This part has been severely affected by the building of the A4320 which completely bisected the road in the 1970s causing a large gap. The road was originally meant to be part of a much grander ring road around inner Bristol, but these plans were eventually shelved although the road was extended to the A4 in the 1990s. The large gap is connected by both pedestrian crossings and a subway, however the road is further disjointed by the fact that through traffic—apart from buses, taxis and bikes—cannot continue along the Stapleton Road here and must travel to the M32 Junction 1 roundabout to get back on to the A432.

From here on most of the road is pre war on both sides. This area has been particularly notable for its crime rate. Further along it is crossed by the Cross Country Route railway line next to Stapleton Road railway station. The station is on the Cross Country Route between Bristol Temple Meads and Bristol Parkway, and on the Severn Beach Line from Bristol Temple Meads to Severn Beach.

After the railway line a short section of the River Frome runs close to the road. It used to be open, but was culverted around the time the M32 was built, and a footpath runs coherently with the route of the river and there is now a small park called Fox Park on the location. The Stapleton Road TOTSOs at the junction with the Fishponds Road in Eastville Coherently the A432 continues along the Fishponds road as the main street, still with some shops, and the cultural change towards Fishponds occurs further on where it meeds the Muller road.

From here on the road changes character. Following on the Stapleton Road becomes a less grand affair and is mainly residential. Also, since the building of the M32 the road has become much narrower and one side has become lost to the M32 and traffic can only head northbound. A small section of the road was obliterated for building of the M32 Junction 2 in the 1970s. After the roundabout the road is once again two way and gains the number B4058 shortly before dives once again under the M32 and crosses over the river Frome, becoming Bell Hill at the junction with Glenfrome Road, finally having reached Stapleton.
