= St Paul's Gardens, Bristol =

Council housing estate in Bristol, England

St Paul's Gardens
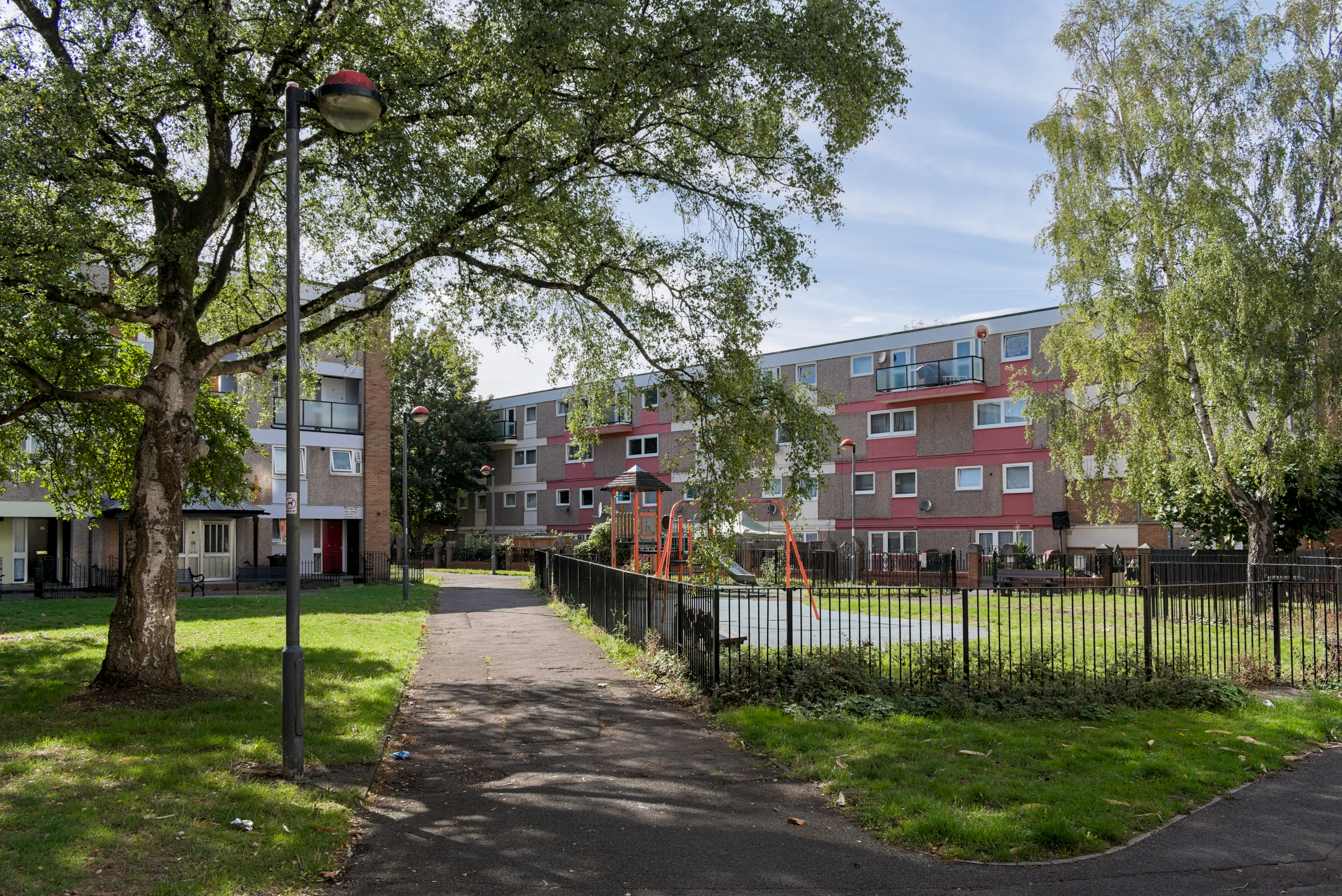
- Staggered modernist blocks viewed from Halston Drive and Ludlow Close
- Interactive map of the St Paul's Gardens area

General information
- Type: Apartment complex and maisonettes
- Architectural style: Modernist
- Location: Bristol, England
- Coordinates: 51.463°N 2.583°W
- Construction started: December 1968
- Completed: December 1969
- Cost: £675,700 (construction) £72,500 (infrastructure)
- Client: Bristol Housing Committee
- Owner: Bristol City Council

Design and construction
- Architect: Albert H. Clarke
- Architecture firm: City Architect's Department
- Main contractor: George Wimpey

Other information
- Number of units: 198

St Paul's Gardens, originally known as the Bishop Street development, is a council housing estate in the St Pauls district of Bristol, England. Designed by City Architect Albert H. Clarke, the 198-unit development was officially opened in December 1969 as a replacement for the blighted Victorian terraces of the Bishop Street area. Architecturally, the estate is defined by a series of low-rise blocks arranged on a diagonal axis, and is the oldest council estate in the St Paul's area. In later decades, the estate has undergone renovations, including through the 1990s Estates Action programme and the 2020 Green Way renovation project.

== History ==
=== Background ===
Prior to the estate's construction, the site, bounded by the now-razed thoroughfares of Bishop Street and Martin Street, was occupied by a group of terraces constructed in 1865. Historically, this specific area of land was partly on the Forlorn Hope Estate, which had been redeveloped into housing in the 19th century. In the mid-20th century, St Paul's became characterised by a "rich and distinctive" but deteriorating Georgian and Victorian townscape. In March 1967, a public inquiry into the city's development plan revealed the extent of the deprivation in the area, with City Engineer James Bennett testifying that the Bishop Street area had the "poorest amenities in Bristol", with more than 80 per cent of homes lacking a fixed bath and 40 per cent lacking a cold water supply.

During the early clearance phase in mid-1967, the site became the centre of a political scandal. As properties were vacated and left derelict prior to demolition, residents complained of vagrancy, theft, and fire risk in the neighbourhood. By September 1967, Owen Henry, a prominent local activist and leader of the Commonwealth Co-ordinated Committee, accused the Bristol Corporation of creating a shanty town and a ghetto. Campaigners organised house-to-house collections of statements to petition the local Member of Parliament, Arthur Palmer, as an outcry against rat infestations and the danger posed to children by unsecured vacant houses. The housing crisis in the area was further exacerbated when the Bristol Corporation rejected an offer of 400 new homes from Cwmbran New Town in Wales, a decision unpopular with St Paul's residents who argued the offer should have been considered given the shortage of local council units.

In response to the "shanty town" protests and the deteriorating conditions, the Bristol Housing Committee decided in October 1967 to accelerate the redevelopment of the area. Originally scheduled for the 1969 building programme, the Bishop Street scheme was brought forward by two years, with the committee chairman promising to "brook no delays" in clearing the desolate site. By the time the Evening Post released a special supplement on St Paul's on 17 September 1968, 280 houses between Martin Street and Bishop Street had already been demolished. During the initial stages of the final clearances in June 1969, the demolition process was accelerated after workmen encountered infestations in the derelict buildings, resulting in the Bristol Fire Brigade and Ambulance Service being deployed to deliberately gut the remaining houses with fire, eradicating infestations of lice, fleas, and rats before bulldozers were used to destroy the remains of the terraces.

=== Bishop Street development ===
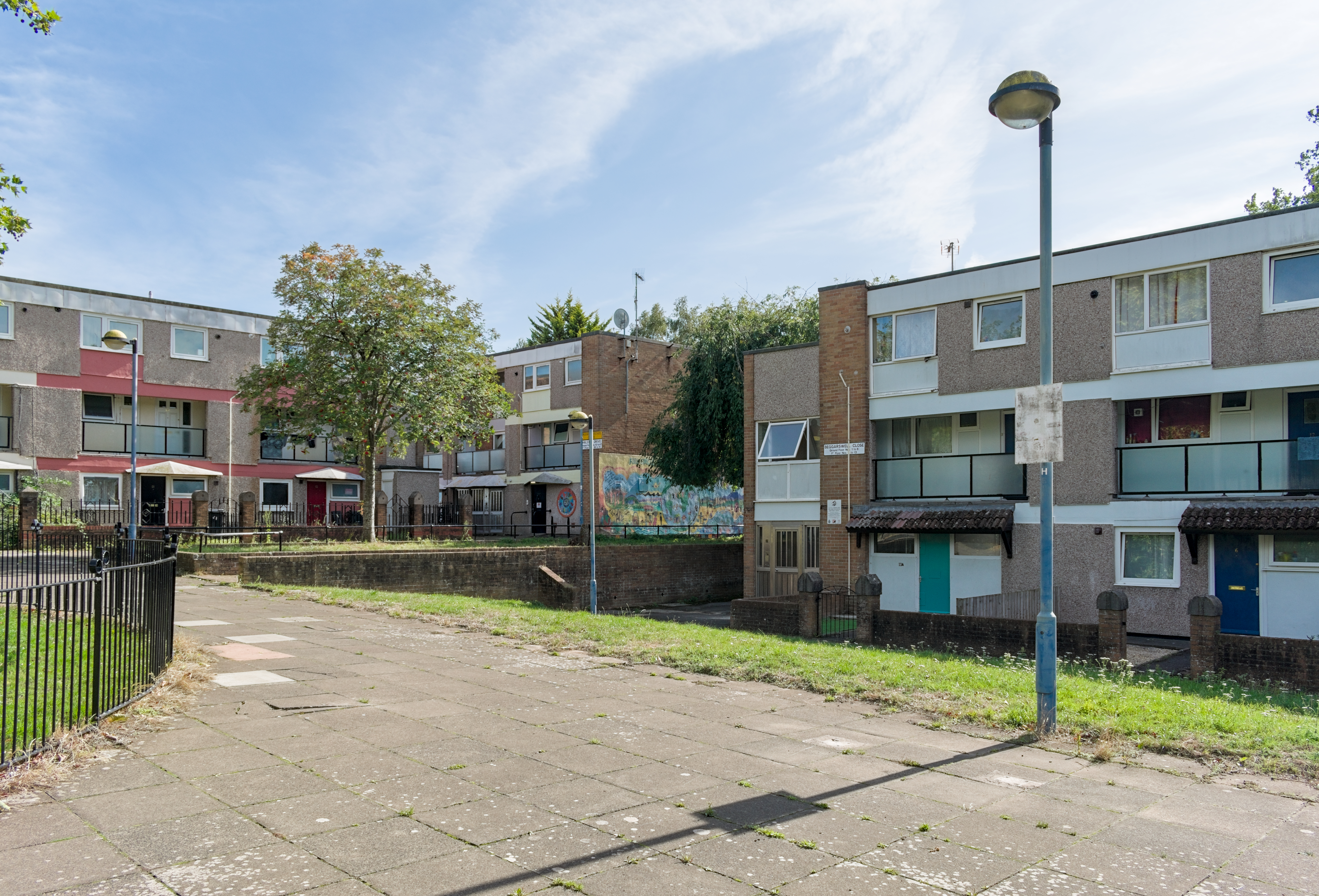
Blocks belonging to Halston Drive and Beggarswell Close

The City Architect, Albert H. Clarke, was tasked with producing a layout, and planning permission was secured rapidly. In November 1967, two national construction firms, John Laing and George Wimpey, presented competing proposals to the Housing Committee to build approximately 200 dwellings on the site. The final scheme, approved that same month, included a mix of houses, flats, and maisonettes, alongside a £33,000 day nursery. Original plans suggest this was intended as the first phase of a larger redevelopment extending to Portland Square, though this was never realised.

In March 1968, the Bristol Corporation issued compulsory purchase orders for 50 sites across Bishop Street, Martin Street, and Alfred Street. To aid the transition, local councillors successfully advocated for social workers to assist residents in understanding the redevelopment plans in "layman's terms". The main contract for the 198 dwellings was awarded to George Wimpey for £675,700, with an additional £72,500 contract for infrastructure. Construction began in December 1968.

Completion of the first 120 units in November 1969 coincided with an emergency housing crisis. Following the safety review triggered by the Ronan Point collapse, 384 families were evacuated from multi-storey blocks in the nearby St Jude's estate; the newly finished Bishop Street flats were used as temporary accommodation for these displaced residents. Upon moving in, early residents praised the space and modern kitchens, contrasting them with the high-rise flats many had turned down. Contemporary commentary by Keith Brace in 1971 highlighted the contrast between the "elbowing friendliness" of the demolished streets and the "warmth and comfort" of the new flats.

== Architecture and facilities ==
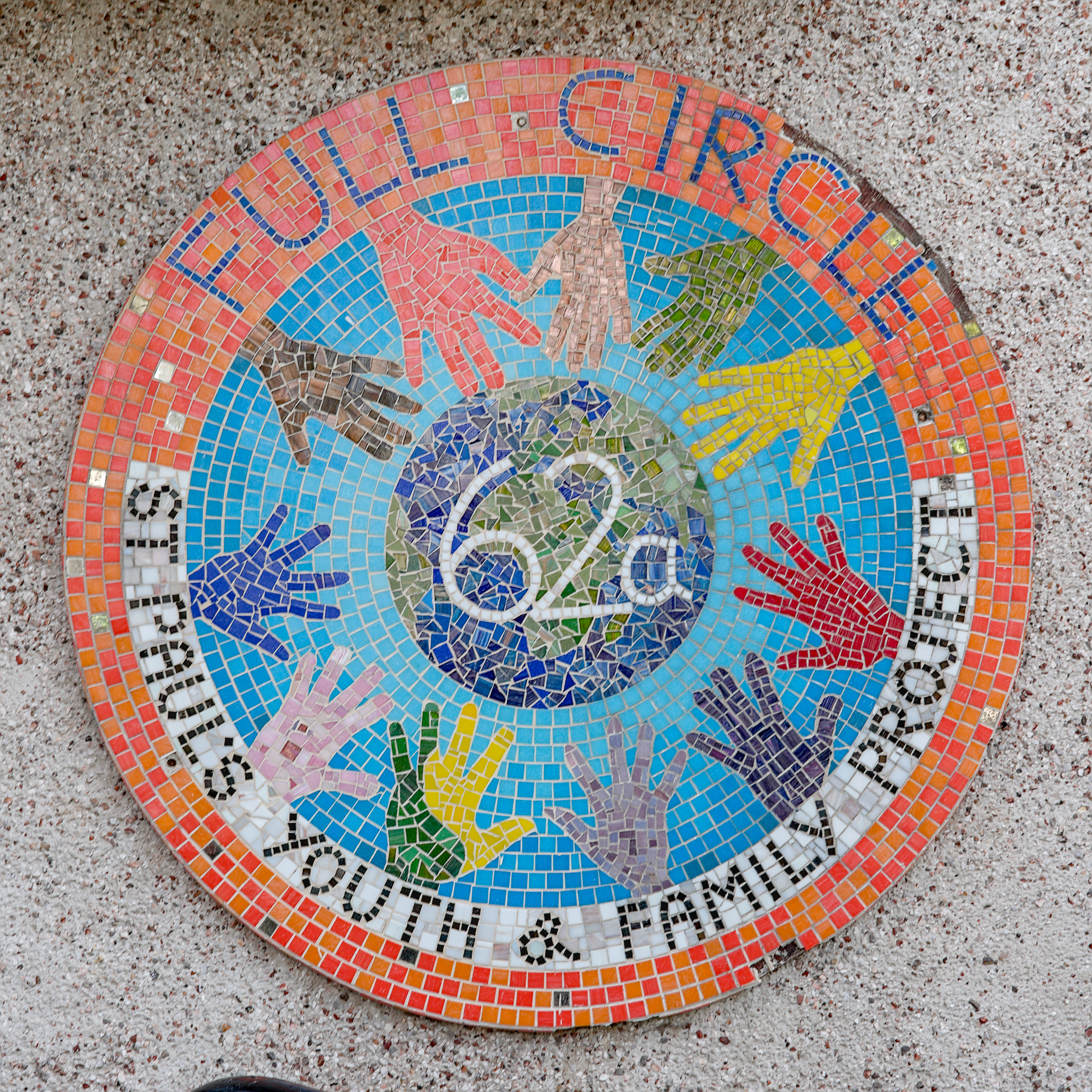
A mosaic for the St Paul's Youth & Family Project outside the Priority Estate Office (62a Halston Drive)

The estate comprises a series of low-rise maisonette and apartment blocks, primarily of three and four storeys, constructed of concrete. In a departure from the surrounding street grid, the blocks are aligned on a north-west to south-east diagonal axis. This arrangement eschews continuous street frontages in favour of a series of staggered rows that define internal communal squares and green spaces, and was designed specifically to provide a continuous sight-line of St Paul's Church.

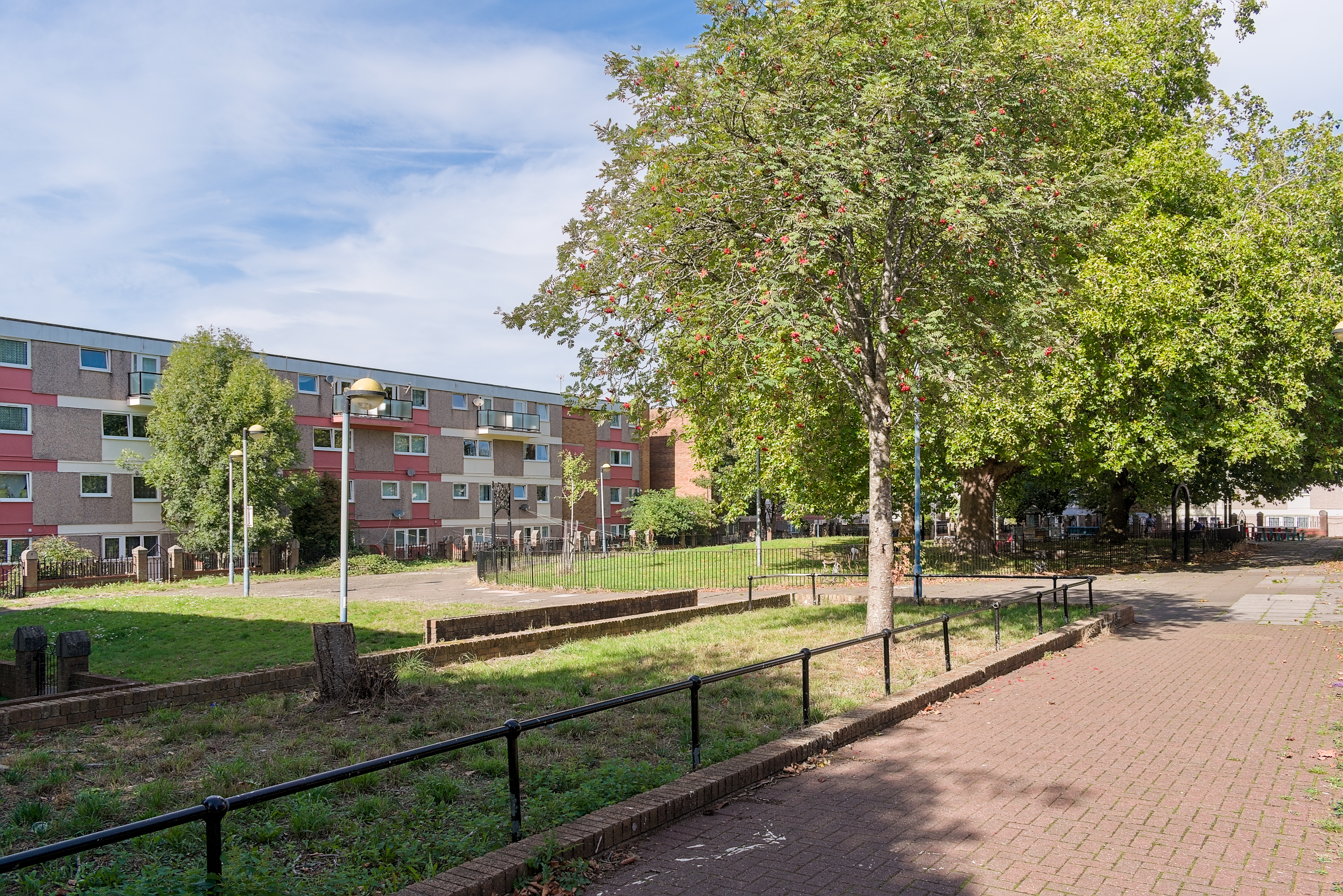
The central green spaces of the area, with The Oval on the right

The layout restricts vehicular access to the perimeter, instead consisting of a network of internal pedestrian paths. To accommodate car ownership, parking spaces were created at the periphery of the estate along with 49 garages. The focal point of the estate is the central green, known as The Oval, around which the primary residential blocks are clustered. To the north lies a community centre, while a playground services the eastern area. The Halston Drive Community Room is situated to the southeast. This community room has historically hosted the St Paul's Youth & Family Project, and the St Paul's Gardens Interim Estate Management Board, which hosted an annual fête on The Oval and monthly meetings in the 1990s. More recently, it has been the home of local Somali community groups including HEROS and TALO. Founded in 2017 by Hibo Mahamoud, TALO acts as an advice centre for the local community.

Between 1989 and 1992, the estate underwent a £1.7 million refurbishment funded by the government's Estates Action programme. Developed by the city council in partnership with the interim estate management board, the initiative aimed to improve safety and environmental standards for 64 houses and maisonettes. This led to the installation of controlled door entry systems, new street lighting, and new landscaping.

In March 2003, security measures were expanded via a £1.5 million Home Office project that installed 108 CCTV cameras across the blocks in St Paul's Gardens and St Jude's Estate. The cameras were introduced with running costs funded through a weekly service charge for the estate's residents.

In 2020, some parts of the estate were upgraded as part of The Green Way, a project led by the Architecture Centre and local stakeholders. This initiative sought to better connect the estate's dispersed community groups and renovated the Halston Drive Community Room. The project introduced new planting, seating, and lighting, alongside a series of murals by local artists Graft and Helyn Gulley, designed to represent the wider area's cultural diversity and heritage.

== See also ==
- Buildings and architecture of Bristol
