= St Jude's, Bristol =

Area of Bristol, England

Coordinates: 51.460633°N 2.5768567°W

St Jude's
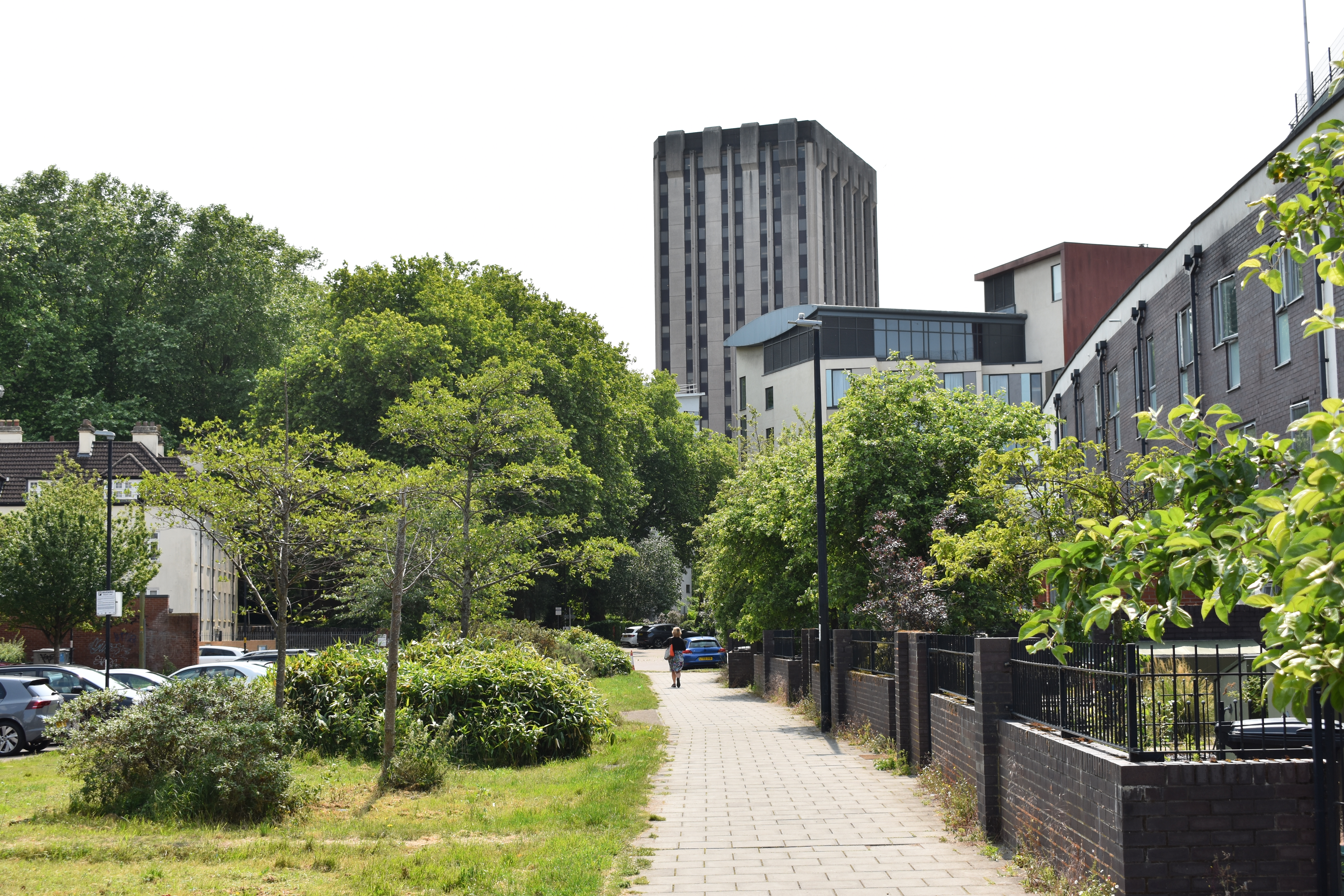
- River Street

- Location within Bristol
- OS grid reference: ST600736
- Unitary authority: Bristol
- Ceremonial county: Bristol
- Region: South West
- Country: England
- Sovereign state: United Kingdom
- Post town: BRISTOL
- Dialling code: 0117
- Police: Avon and Somerset
- Fire: Avon
- Ambulance: South Western
- UK Parliament: Bristol East

St Jude's is a mixed residential, commercial, and light industrial area of central Bristol, England, forming part of the Lawrence Hill ward. Situated immediately east of Broadmead and the city centre, parts of the area were historically known as Poyntz Pool and the Lamb Ground. It developed from a 17th-century extra-mural settlement into a densely populated Victorian district.

In the 20th century, St Jude's underwent the process of slum clearance and redevelopment, resulting in the high-density social housing that characterises much of the area today. The neighbourhood is bounded by the M32 motorway to the north-west, Stapleton Road to the east, and Easton Way to the north. St Jude's has historically been an area populated by immigrant communities, and remains a culturally diverse area today.

== Geography ==
St Jude's is a low-lying area of the lower Frome valley situated between the River Avon and River Frome. The area sits between the hills of northern Bristol to the west and Trooper's Hill to the east.

A tributary of the Bristol Avon, the River Frome flows through the northern section of the district. In this area, the river is heavily channelised and semi-culverted; it runs along the southern edge of Riverside Park, separating the residential streets from the motorway, before disappearing underground beneath the Cabot Circus car park at Wade Street. Originally joining the Avon near Bristol Bridge, the Frome was historically diverted to form the Bristol Castle moat and later the Floating Harbour at St Augustine's Reach.

There were major flooding events in the immediate area at Baptist Mills in 1882 and 1888. To reduce flood risk in the neighbourhood and surrounding areas, the Northern Stormwater Interceptor was constructed in the 1960s. This large culvert diverts excessive fluvial flow from the Frome at a system of sluices in Eastville, upstream of St Jude's, thus bypassing the area entirely and discharging directly into the River Avon near the Clifton Suspension Bridge.

St Jude's is at the western end of the Frome Valley Walkway.

=== Boundaries ===
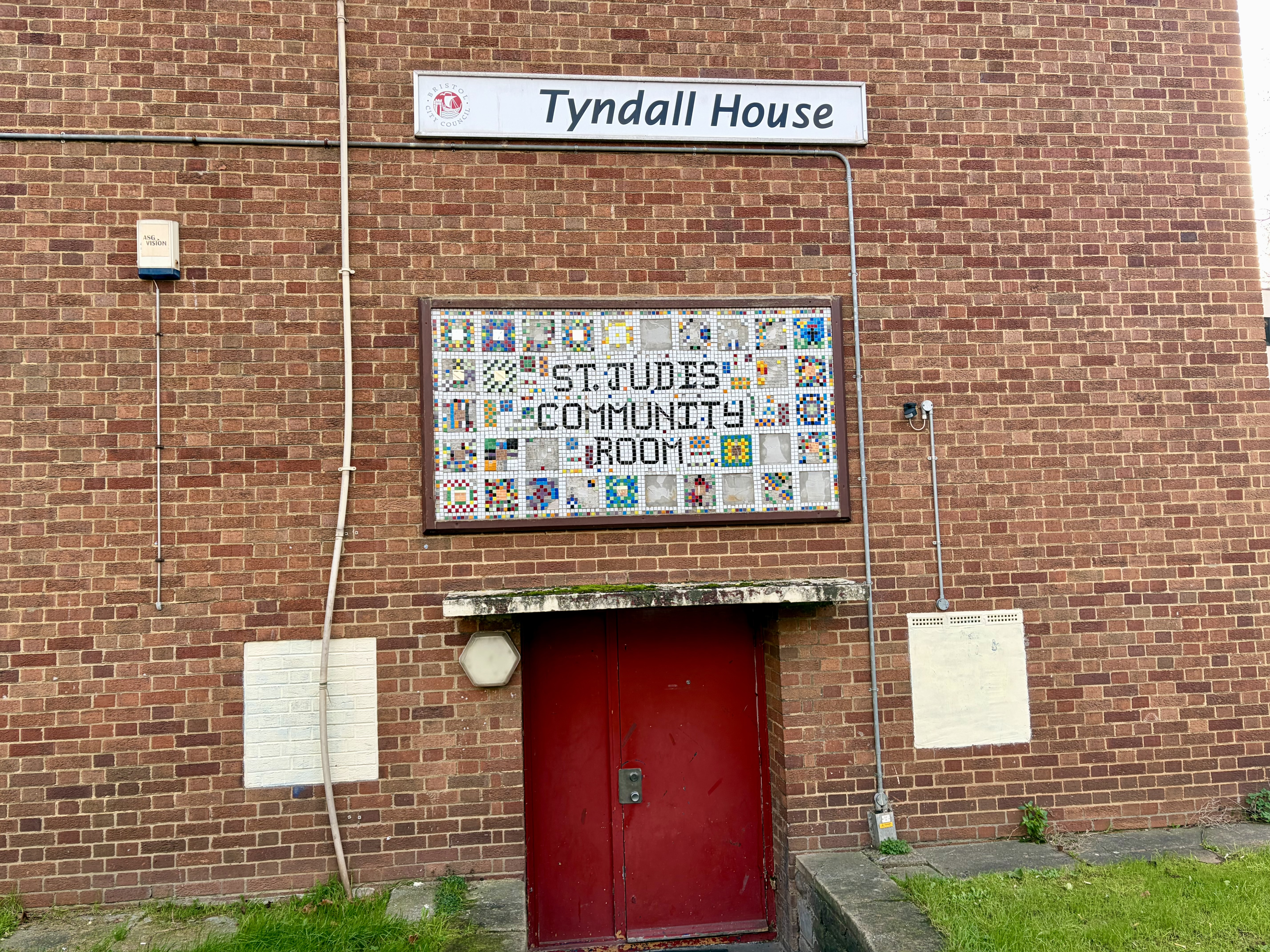
Signage at the former St Jude's Community Room, one of the few signs explicitly naming the area

Present day St Jude's is an informal but widely referenced neighbourhood within the wider area of Easton. St Jude's sits in the Lawrence Hill ward of the city, county and unitary authority of Bristol; the neighbourhood is within the boundaries of the Bristol East parliamentary constituency and the historic county of Gloucestershire. Part of St Jude's is included in the Old Market Quarter neighbourhood planning area. St Jude's is co-terminus with Lawrence Hill ward polling districts B and D, and is split between the Temple Meads, Barton Hill and Upper Easton 2021 census output areas. The whole of St Jude's notionally sits inside the Eastside Community.

The name is often used interchangeably with the wider area of Easton and, in part, with Old Market Quarter. Ordnance Survey carries no locale name for the area, but local services define the boundaries as: the A420 north of Old Market roundabout; east onto Newfoundland Way; south east; then west onto Easton Way, Easton Road, West Street and Old Market. The only known street signage or infrastructure to explicitly reference St Jude's is the former St Jude's Community Room at Tyndall House on Great George Street.

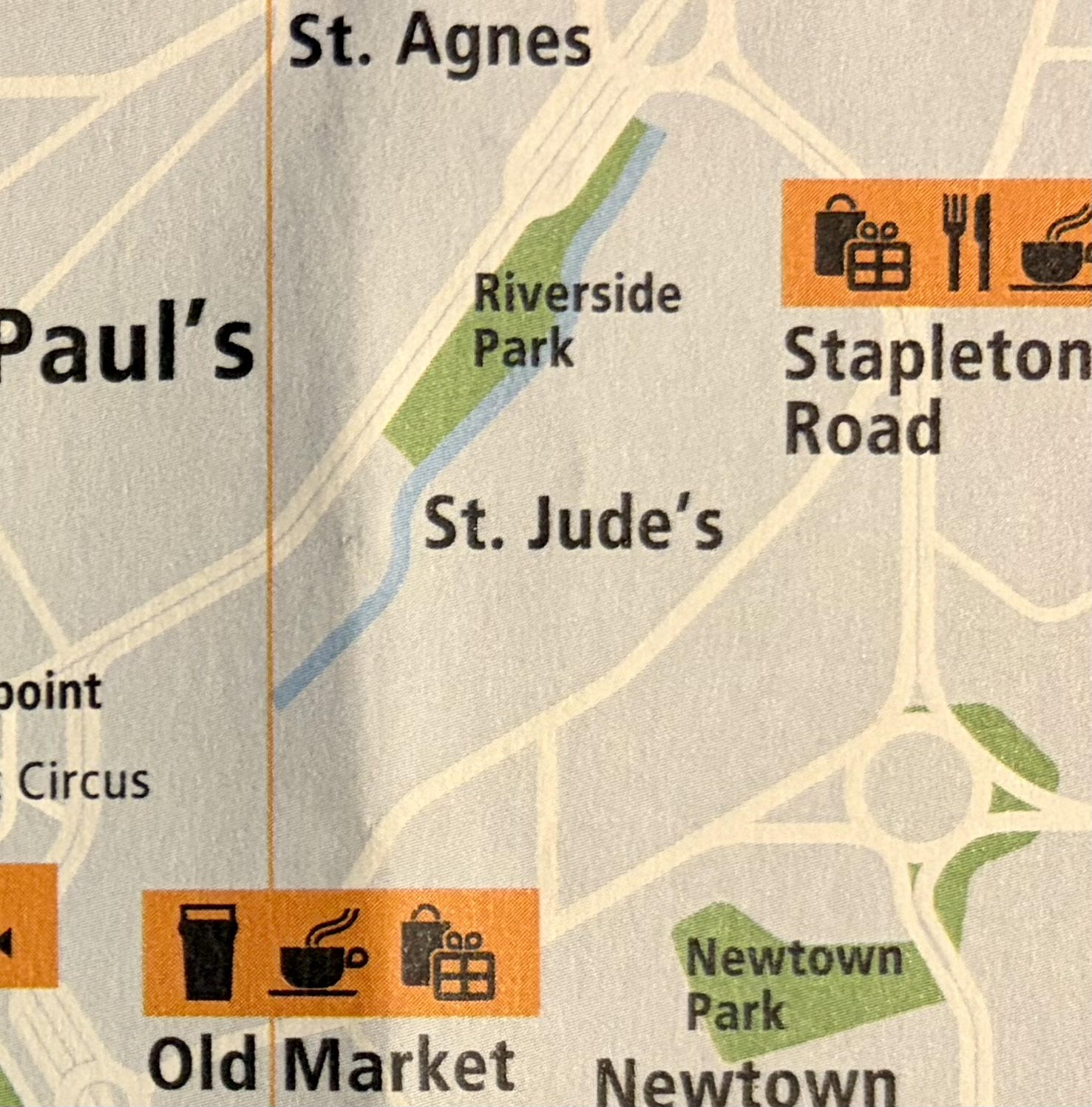
Bristol Legible City map (2018) part of a project to create a consistent identity for Bristol, helping residents and visitors better understand the city's layout

The whole area between the Newfoundland Way/M32 in the west and Stapleton Road to the east is now commonly known as St Jude's, with Easton Way as a northern boundary and the northernmost section of Temple Way as a western boundary. Common references naming St Jude's in connection with particular locations include: the Frome Gateway on either side of the River Frome (including Riverside Park and Houlton Street); Rawnsley Park bordering Easton Way and Stapleton Road; the former Trinity Church (now the Trinity Centre); Gloucester Lane; Redcross Place; St Matthias Park; Champion Square; and the Cabot Circus car park. Local media has defined Stapleton Road and Clifton Place as the border between St Jude's and Easton. Other names in existence for this same area are not in common usage, such as St Stephen, St Matthias Park, and Trinity.

==== Historic boundaries ====
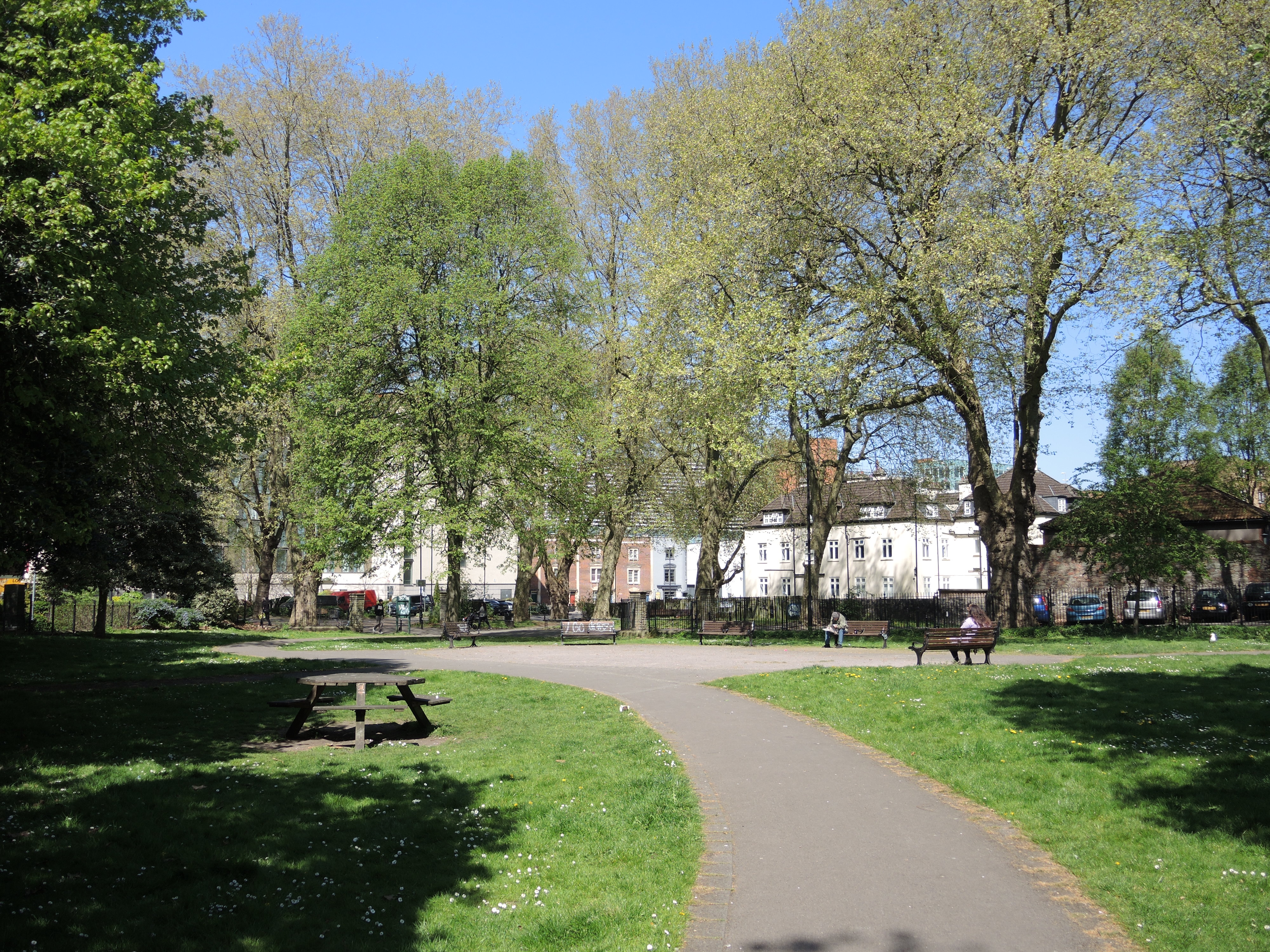
St Matthias Park, located in the west side of the neighbourhood, retains the name of the former parish

The size and extent of the neighbourhood of St Jude's has changed over time since the creation of the original parish in 1844. St Jude's today comprises land from parts of former parishes including St Philip & Jacob within, St Philip & Jacob without, St Peter, Holy Trinity, St Matthias on the Weir, St Paul, St Paul outparish, St Simon, St Mark, St Werburgh, and St Barnabas.

Sited in the Swineshead Hundred in the Domesday book, later moved into the Barton Regis Hundred, most of the area later known as St Jude's was part of St Philip & Jacob parish until 1834. From 1836 this area was administered under the Poor Laws by the Clifton Union rather than Barton Regis. By 1877 the Clifton Union had been renamed to the Barton Regis Union. (Note: Not to be confused with the Barton Regis Rural Sanitary District (1875) or Rural District (1894).)

Much of current St Jude's was outside the Bristol city boundary until 1835, exceptions being Redcross Street to Old Market, St Matthias Park, part of River Street and the northern section of Champion Square. St Philip & Jacob, including the rest of St Jude's, joined the city in 1835. The rest of Easton followed in 1897.

St Philip & Jacob parish created Holy Trinity parish covering much of present day St Jude's in 1832. Trinity was further divided into St Simon (1844), St Jude (1844), and St Matthias on the Weir (1846). These parishes continued to be part of the consolidated chapelry of St Philip & Jacob Without when it formally separated into an in-parish and out-parish in 1865.

The original parish of St Jude's established in 1844 was a small urban area. The Order in Council ratifying the district in June 1844 defined the precise boundaries using the centre-lines of local streets. The district was bounded on the northwest by the parishes of St Peter and St Paul, and on the west and southwest by the parish of St Philip and Jacob. The eastern boundary was defined by an arbitrary line commencing from the Frome and extending southeast along the middle of Eugene Street. It then turned southwest along Little Ann Street, southeast along Wade Street, crossing Gloucester Road to run along the middle of Brick Street. The line then turned westward along Bragg's Lane, southwest along Gloucester Lane, and finally westward along West Street to meet the parish boundary of St Philip and Jacob. St Matthias was merged into St Jude's parish in 1937. By 1975 the Easton Christian Family Centre comprised the merged parishes of Holy Trinity, St Philip, St Gabriel, St Jude and St Lawrence.

==== Impact of inner city regeneration ====
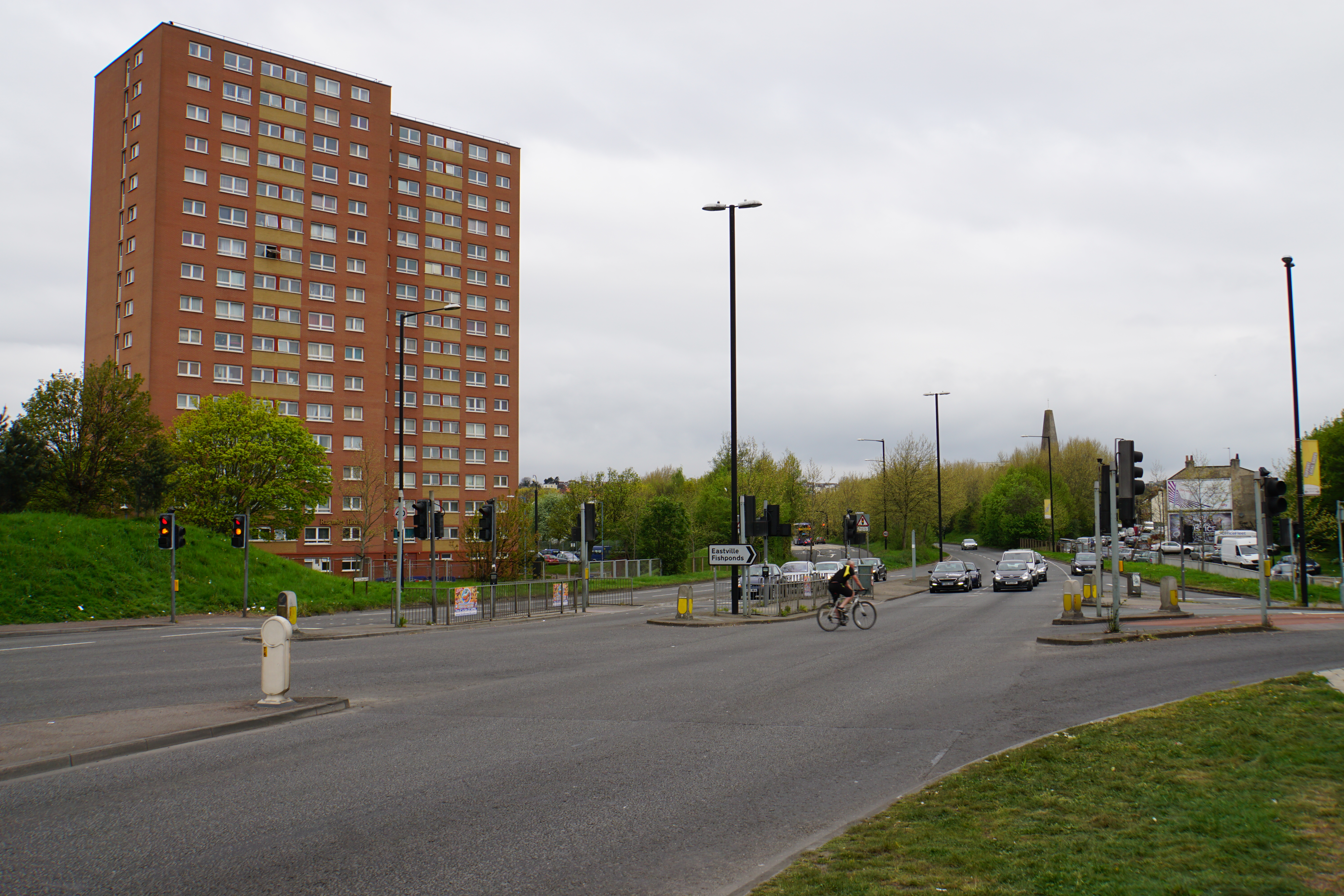
The dual carriageway at Easton Way

Before World War II, St Jude's was a community adjacent to the 'golden mile', a collective name for a series of contiguous shopping streets running from the city centre to Lawrence Hill. The wider area comprised a continuous swathe of tight terraces with small scale industry with few major boundaries. Parts of the River Frome served as a boundary between St Jude's and other parishes.

Inner city regeneration isolated St Jude's from both the city centre and from Easton. To the west, the creation of a dual carriageway underpass in 1967 cut off Old Market from Broad Weir and the city centre. The later development of Cabot Circus to the west, which places its primary public entrances toward the city centre, has been criticised for further isolating the neighbourhood from the city centre. To the east, in the same year, the creation of Easton Way (a dual carriageway that broke Stapleton Road into two discrete areas) severed the community and acts as a barrier for pedestrians.

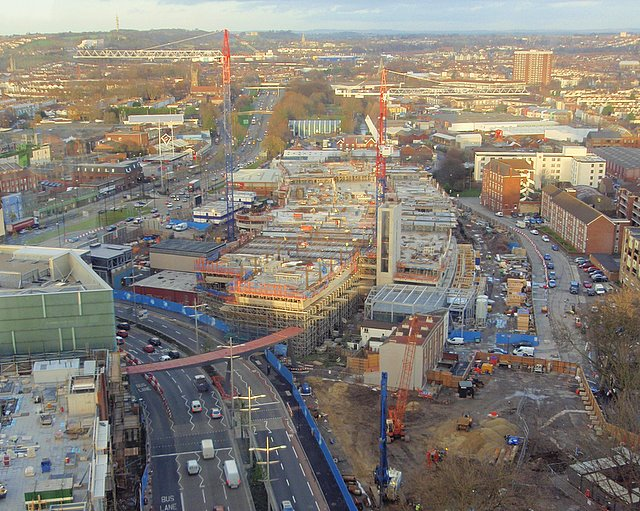
The construction of Cabot Circus car park on the former site of Tollgate House

To the north, where the River Frome had served as a partial boundary, the building of the M32 and Newfoundland Way (A4032) created a new, hard north-western boundary. These roads now act as a unified boundary between council wards and between Parliamentary constituencies. Formerly a part of St Paul then St Barnabas on the western bank of the River Frome, Riverside Park now sits between the main road and the river and is in St Jude's. Similarly, where the A4320 (Easton Way) formed a new hard boundary, a small section of Baptist Mills is now part of Riverside Park in modern day St Jude's.

The historic area of St Jude's did not include Stapleton Road, occupying the space between Old Market Street and the river. The creation of the dual carriageway and Lawrence Hill roundabout created a small, isolated area bounded by Stapleton Road to the west and the Lawrence Hill roundabout to the A4320 (Easton Way). The impact was to divide a previously contiguous sweep of residential, shopping and industry, creating a district isolated from its surrounding areas by the end of the M32 motorway and the network of inner city dual carriageway ring roads.

== History ==
=== Early history ===
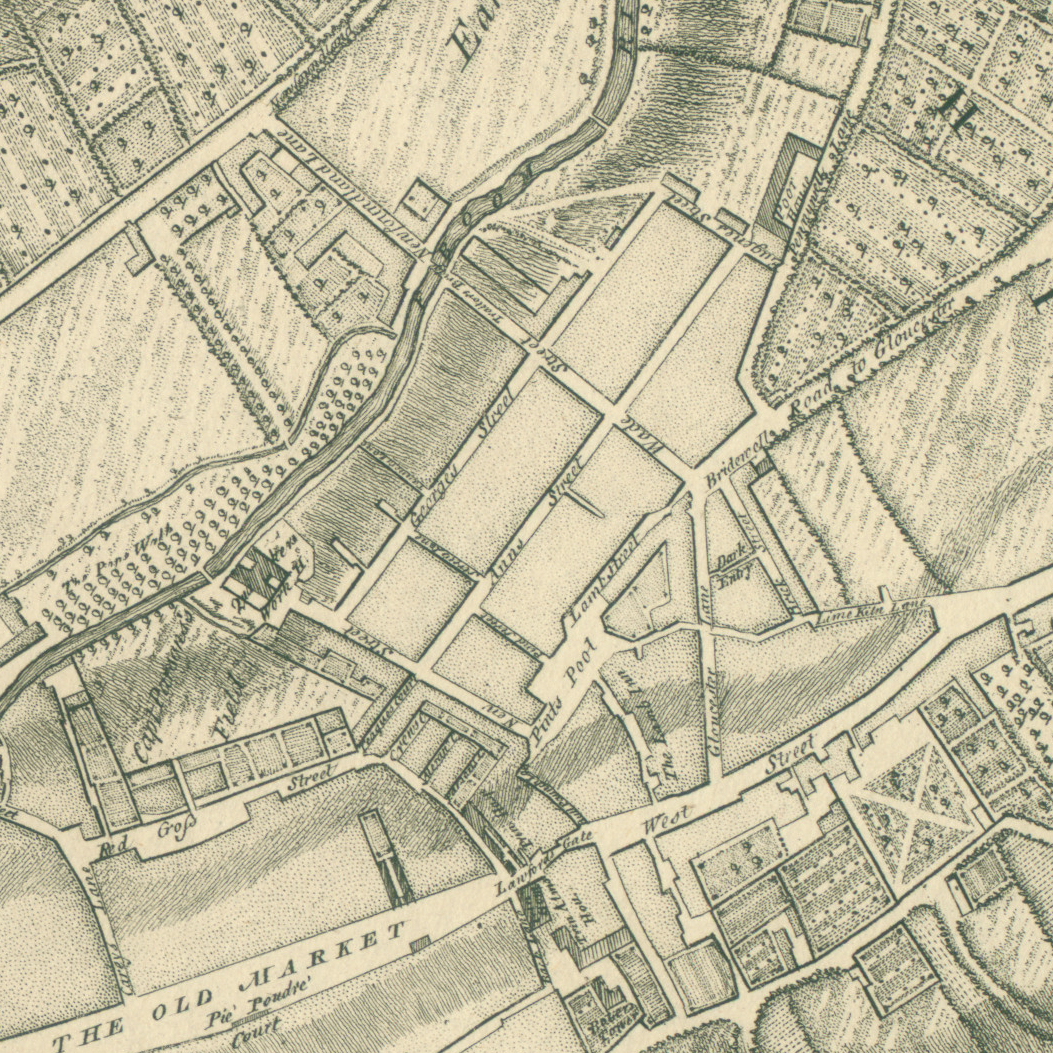
The grid laid out by Nathaniel Wade depicted in John Rocque's 1750 map of Bristol. It also includes Pints Pool, another rendering of Poyntz Pool.

In the medieval period, the land was open pasture situated outside the city walls. By the late 17th century, the area was referred to as Great Wells or the Lamb Ground, an estate of approximately 16 acres named after the Lamb Inn. The Lamb Inn, a triple-gabled timber-framed structure established c. 1651, fronted West Street and remained a local landmark until its demolition for road widening in 1906. It is known as the site where James Nayler stayed before the events of the Nayler case. (Note: It was also the site of alleged supernatural disturbances involving the children of the landlord, Richard Giles. The case was investigated by local chemist Henry Durbin, who recorded reports of the children suffering bites and scratches from an invisible entity in 1761 and 1762. The events were later cited by the occultist Montague Summers as a potential instance of witchcraft or poltergeist activity.)

Systematic development of the area as part of eastward expansion of Bristol's urban core began under Nathaniel Wade, town clerk of Bristol. Around 1707, Wade began laying out a street grid on the land used as pasture, establishing Wade Street, Great George Street (named for Prince George of Denmark), and Great Ann Street (named for Queen Anne). The development was initially intended for artisans, with early residents including feltmakers, carpenters, and pipe makers. Wade developed the area in partnership with Abraham Hooke, and together they constructed approximately 560 houses in the low-lying marshy area then known as Crotwells. Prior to the dense urbanization of the 18th century, the area was largely open pasture and water meadows. Map evidence from 1673 depicts a lodge known as "The Whistry" situated in a paddock near modern-day Newfoundland Road; this early post-medieval structure stood in isolation before the street grid was established. The district was also home to a community of weavers living just outside Lawford's Gate. In 1729, economic hardship led to a riot in which weavers attacked the home of Stephen Feacham, an unpopular employer, resulting in fatalities when troops fired on the crowd.

There has also been evidence of sugar refining in the vicinity, a major Bristol industry of the era. Archaeological findings included industrial pottery such as syrup-collecting jars and conical sugar moulds used to refine sugar loaves, likely dating between 1750 and 1850, though it is unclear if a refinery existed on-site. Additionally, specific clay tobacco pipe makers operating in the area have been identified through stamped waste found in local cellars, including William Foord (active 1733–1754) and the Corcoran family, who operated a pipe factory on New Street in the late 19th century.

An excavation of a proposed residential development, on a site of 1,260 m² at the corner and on the north-west side of Little Anne Street and Wade Street, uncovered 18th century artisan's houses. Census records and other primary sources suggest that a property within the bounds of the study site, 26 Wade Street, served as a pipe factory, while several pipemaking families and individuals resided within the area. Archaeological finds of pipe-making waste at Monk Street (since razed for Riverside Park) have been linked to the St Jude's industry, with local production being historically centred on New Street and Wade Street. John Wilkey, a local pipemaker, managed the Phoenix Pottery at Baptist Mills for the White family before opening his own factory on Wade Street in 1862 on property owned by the same family. St Jude's was known as the clay pipe-making centre of Bristol with some 27 businesses in the neighbourhood.

Situated at the eastern boundary of the area was Lawford's Gate Prison, constructed in 1791. Designed by George Onesiphorus Paul as a House of Correction for Gloucestershire, the facility was intended to enforce modern ideas of prison reform, including controlled diets and labour. The prison was severely damaged during the 1831 Bristol riots, where the treadmill and gallows were destroyed and prisoners released. While the ruins remained for nearly a century, the structure was finally demolished in 1926 to make way for municipal housing.

=== 19th century ===
By the 19th century, the open ground near the Lamb Inn had become known as Poyntz Pool. The etymology is uncertain, but east Bristol historians Williams & Humphries record that it was named for the Poyntz family of the manor of Iron Acton. Poyntz Pool was rendered as Pints Pool on John Rocque's 1742 map. The area gained notoriety for lawlessness and "unhallowed revelry"; it was historically a site for bull-baiting, leading to the local thoroughfare of Lawford Street being colloquially known as Bull Paunch Lane. This lane connected to Butchers' Row, an area housing four slaughterhouses in the mid-19th century.

As Bristol urbanised, the area became a dense slum, described in 1854 as one of the Bristol's rookeries. Contemporary reports detailed severe overcrowding, with families living in single rooms without water or sanitation. Specific locations such as Whippington Court and the "Dark Entry" were highlighted during an 1864 fever epidemic for their filth and lack of ventilation. The district suffered catastrophically during the earlier cholera epidemic of 1849. A General Board of Health report detailed an outbreak in Redcross Street, specifically within Wellington Court and Gloucester Court. These courts, comprising 66 crowded dwellings, were "honeycombed with cesspools" and bounded by an overcrowded burial ground, which prevented ventilation and leaked drainage into the local water supply. In a single outbreak in June 1849, 44 residents died. The report noted that ill-conceived sanitary improvements, such as untrapped drains connecting privies directly to the sewers, had exacerbated the spread of miasma and disease. The Bath and Wash-House Committee established facilities that were opened in August 1850 as a response to the cholera outbreaks of 1845 and 1849, and were situated adjacent to St Matthias Church. The area moreover had a reputation for violence, with reports of "ruffians" from Poyntz Pool being hired to fight during elections. By the 1880s, the density of the district had increased significantly with the construction of narrow alleyways of housing tucked behind the main streets, such as Pratten's Court and Swan Court.

In 1884, the Bristol Mercury published a comprehensive investigation entitled The Homes of the Bristol Poor, which documented the social conditions around impoverished areas of the city. The report described the district as a network of rookeries, blind alleys, and dark entries, particularly noting the poor conditions present in Great Ann Street, Wade Street, and New Street. It documented the prevalence of tenements where individual rooms were rented to entire families; in one instance, a single house was found to be occupied by 23 people, while in another, a family of eight shared a single bed. In February 1893, a sanitary sub-committee reported that 246 families in St Jude's occupied single rooms, with another 136 families living in two rooms each; despite these findings, the authority decided that no immediate action was necessary.

During the mid-19th century redevelopment in parts of the surrounding area, industrial waste was frequently used to level the terrain. When Victoria Road (now Wellington Road) was constructed in 1855 along the course of the River Frome, layers of clay pipe kiln waste from nearby factories were used to create a solid foundation for the new road surface. The area contained examples of mid-19th century Italianate brick-built terraced housing much like what is extant in Easton and St Paul's.

To address the area's social and spiritual needs, the ecclesiastical district of St Jude's was created. The foundation stone for the church, designed by Samuel Burleigh Gabriel in the 14th-century style, was laid in 1848 on the former waste ground of Poyntz Pool. It was consecrated in 1849, with the Bishop of Gloucester hoping it would bring order to a "den of thieves". At the time of its opening, the new ecclesiastical district, which included Gloucester Lane, Wade Street, and Poyntz Pool, had a population of approximately 5,000 people. In 1848, a plot of land described opposite Lawford's Gate Prison was purchased for the construction of St Nicholas of Tolentino Church. Designed by Charles Hansom, the church was established to serve the large influx of Irish refugees fleeing the Great Famine who had settled in the low-cost housing of the area. John Cozens, a local missionary at the Bristol City Mission on Great Ann Street, also served the area from 1889 to 1900.

=== 20th century ===
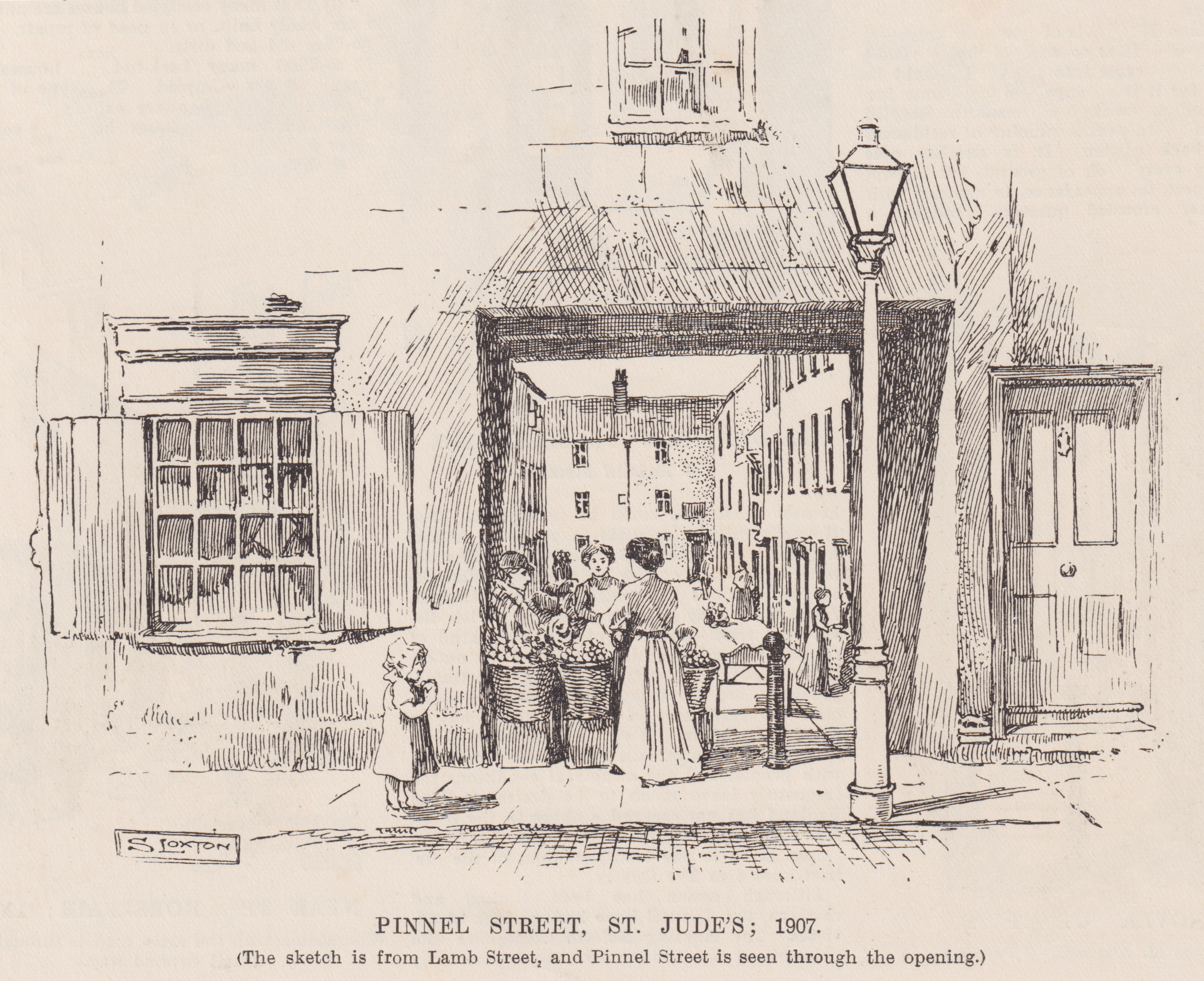
Pinnel Street, St Jude's: 1907, by Samuel Loxton

Before the large-scale clearances of the 1930s, St Jude's was the site of one of Bristol's earliest experiments in municipal housing. In 1901, the Bristol Corporation constructed a block of dwellings on Bragg's Lane, one of only four such sites developed in the city at the turn of the century to replace slum housing. In 1907 St Jude's still described as Bristol's worst slum.

In 1923, the Corporation initiated the Eugene Street Improvement Scheme to address unsanitary housing conditions in the district. The clearance was politically contentious, resulting in local property owners forming defence associations to resist compulsory purchase orders, arguing that the compensation offered, often a nominal £1 based on site value alone, was unjust for many of the homes within the clearance zones. To rehouse the displaced residents, the council constructed the Lawford's Gate Flats on the site of the demolished prison. Completed in early 1925, these three-storey blocks—named Wessex, Somerset, and Gloucester Houses—provided accommodation for 44 families and included amenities considered advanced for the time, such as a central playground and sheds for prams.

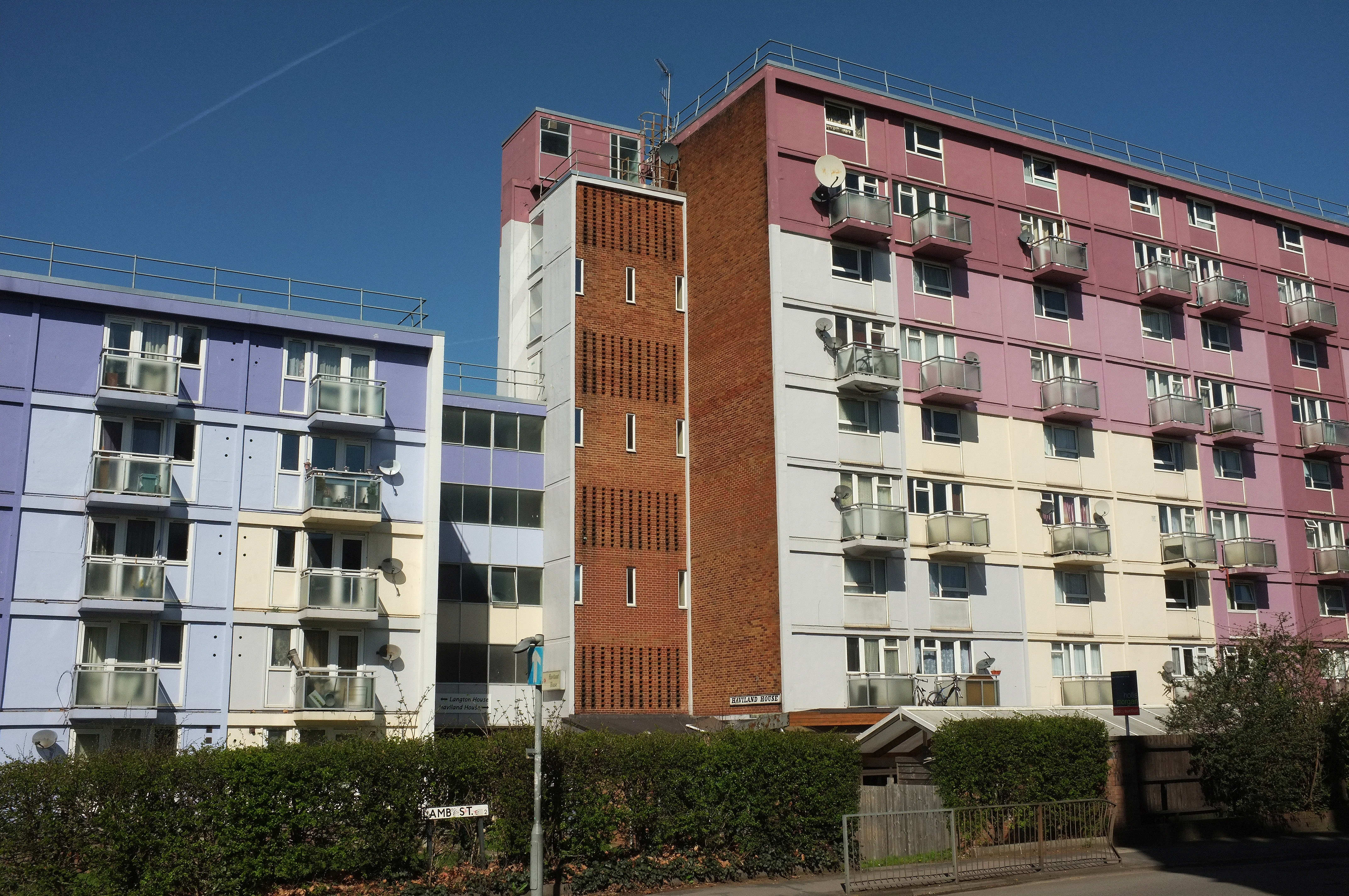
The mid-century tower blocks fronting Lamb Street

Further clearance took place in the 1930s under the Great Ann Street scheme, displacing approximately 1,400 residents. In 1938, the Bristol Corporation opened St Matthias House, a block of municipal flats named after the nearby church which was then facing closure and possible demolition. Following World War II, more of the area was redeveloped with high-density housing. In 1959, tenants moved into the new multi-storey blocks of the St Jude's Estate (Haviland, Charleton, and John Cozens Houses). The construction of the estate was executed in two primary phases, commencing in 1957 under the supervision of the City Architect John Nelson Meredith. Constructed by the firm Stone, the estate comprises four inter-connected residential blocks: Charleton House and Langton House (stage 1), followed by Haviland House and John Cozens House (stage 2). While Langton House was built using in situ reinforced concrete to house single-storey flats, the other three blocks utilised a precast concrete cross-wall construction method to create two-storey maisonettes. A dedicated nursery was also built for the estate. Following its completion, the St Jude's Estate was described by architectural critics as among the most successful post-war projects in Bristol.

However, the safety of these dwellings was called into question following the Ronan Point disaster in London. In 1968 the Bristol Housing Committee removed gas supplies from 258 tenants in seven of the blocks in St Jude's and switching the estate to an electric supply to mitigate the risk of progressive collapse. This would not be enough, as in November 1969, Bristol Corporation ordered the immediate evacuation of 135 families from the St Jude's blocks due to concerns that the pre-cast concrete joints could fail during high winds or a gas explosion. Tenants were temporarily moved to the new St Paul's Gardens estate while structural strengthening was undertaken and electric cooking was installed.

Commercial redevelopment also occurred during this period, with the erection of Tollgate House, a 19-storey Y-shaped office block later occupied by the Department of the Environment. It was completed in 1974 on the site of a former vinegar works at a cost of £3.5 million and originally intended to house the corporate operations of Beaverbrook Newspapers.

=== 21st century ===
In conjunction with the development of Cabot Circus from 2005 to 2008, some parts of St Jude's also saw redevelopment. The area to the south of the Cabot Circus car park at Wellington Road and River Street was redeveloped into a new public space known as Champion Square by landscape architects New Leaf Studio, forming a pedestrian area that joins St Matthias Park. It was named for the Champions, a prominent Quaker family in the local area during the 18th century.

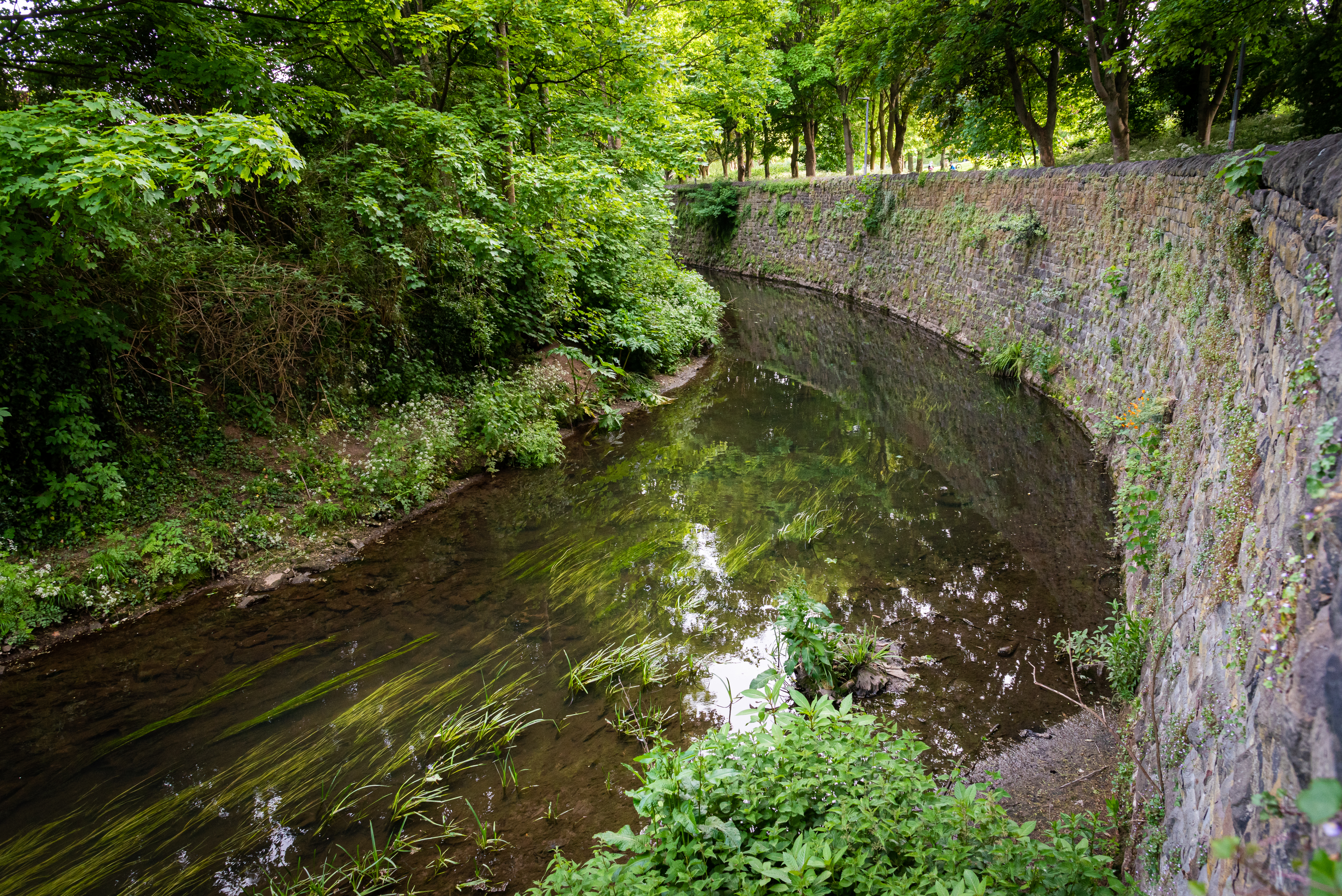
The River Frome flowing through Riverside Park

In the 2020s, St Jude's became the focus of the Frome Gateway Regeneration Framework, a long-term plan to transform the area's light industrial zones into a mixed-use neighbourhood providing approximately 1,000 new homes. The framework proposes the demolition of existing industrial units to create a mixed-use neighbourhood. Specific developments approved in 2025 include the transformation of the former Alide plant hire site and the Crown Sawmills (since Scaddings Timber Importers) into student accommodation and rental apartments. The regeneration plan also outlines the naturalisation of the River Frome within Riverside Park to improve flood resilience and public visibility.

By the 2023, the condition of the housing stock in the St Jude's Estate had deteriorated, with residents reporting damp, mould, and leaks. Following a campaign by ACORN, which included a march on the City Hall in September 2023, the council committed to an £18 million refurbishment programme. However, following the emergency evacuation of the similarly constructed Barton House in 2023, extensive structural surveys were commissioned for the St Jude's Estate, which again suggested the buildings were insufficiently constructed. By 2024, structural surveys by engineering firm Ridge identified that John Cozens, Haviland, and Charleton Houses lacked sufficient horizontal and vertical ties, making them vulnerable to collapse in the event of an internal explosion. As of 2025, there were 539 registered residents living in 135 homes within these blocks. To mitigate risks, the council implemented a waking watch fire safety patrol in September 2024. The council subsequently cancelled an £18 million refurbishment scheme to prioritise essential fire safety upgrades and investigate potential options for the site. Consequently, in May 2025, the council cancelled the full refurbishment programme to prioritise essential fire safety upgrades and prohibited the storage of gas canisters and high-capacity batteries within the blocks.

== Demographics ==
St Jude's has historically served as a gateway for diverse immigrant communities. In the 1960s, the Rosemary Nursery School in Haviland House catered to Greek-Cypriot, Italian, German, and Jamaican families. While drawing from the wider city, only a small portion of residents within the flats initially utilised the nursery. By the early 21st century, a significant Somali community settled in the area, largely served by the Albaseera Mosque. The church of St Nicholas of Tolentino reported in 2008 that its congregation represented over 50 different nationalities. The district remains a transient residential area, with many families living in high-density, social-rented tenements.

== Built environment ==
The built environment of St Jude's is characterised by a mixture of inter- and post-war social housing, remnant industrial architecture, and a number of religious institutions serving a diverse range of religions and denominations.

=== Historic buildings ===
Several buildings from the area's industrial heyday have survived clearances and are recognised on the Bristol Local List:

- Globe House on Eugene Street, originally built c. 1880 as the Globe Steam Joinery Works for Eastabrook and Sons. It was later expanded between 1907 and 1932 for the Globe Refining Company.
- The Guild Heritage Building on Bragg's Lane.
- Swift and Company Warehouse on Bragg's Lane. It was added to the local list in 2016.
- E. Baily and Son Malthouse, a surviving industrial malt house now used as an events venue known as the Old Malt House.
- Redwood House at 1–3 Wade Street, a building that was retained and preserved due to its heritage value despite extensive redevelopment in its surrounding area. It was built in 1904–1905 as a municipal hostel, and now contains apartments.

Some historic public houses remain in the area, including the Crown Tavern on Lawford's Gate, which underwent refurbishment in 2024 and is noted for serving Bass ale from the barrel; and the Swan with Two Necks on Little Ann Street, which is locally listed along with its outbuildings. There are also two pubs that are Grade II listed on the National Heritage List for England: The Phoenix on Champion Square (formerly Wellington Road) and The Volunteer Tavern on New Street. Many other public houses were razed in the various waves of the area's redevelopment, including those at Great George Street and Great Ann Street such as the Three Tuns and the Marquis of Granby. The Seven Ways Inn, formerly known as the Swan (and later the New Swan), is another former public house on New Street that was rebuilt in 1891 to facilitate the widening of Great Ann Street. Excavations in 2013 revealed extensive 18th-century cellar passages beneath the site, which had been backfilled with ash and clay pipe kiln waste from the neighbouring pipe factory. 17 Wade Street, occupied by a butcher shop named J. D. Brittan, was locally listed but eventually demolished for redevelopment.

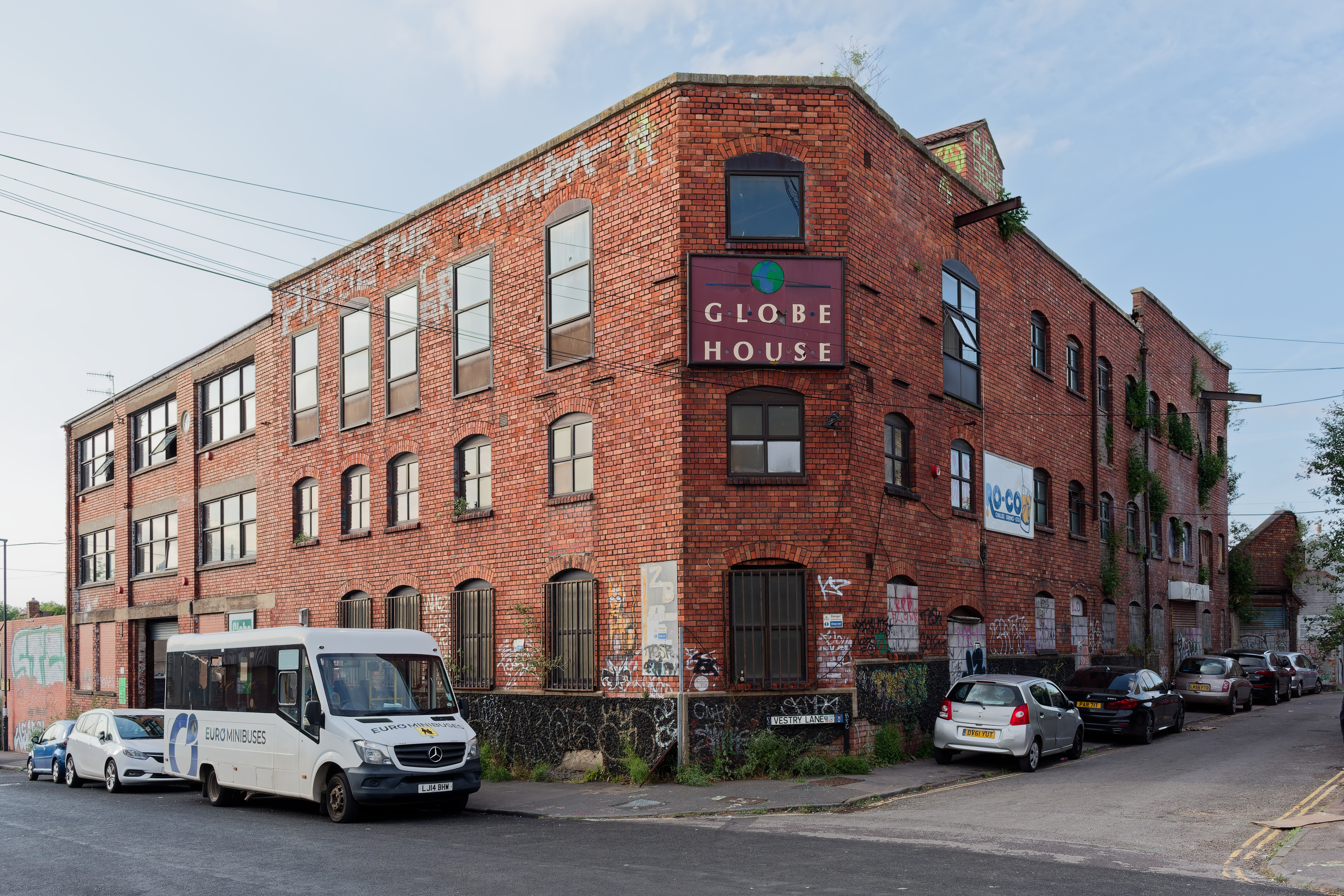
Globe House on Eugene Street

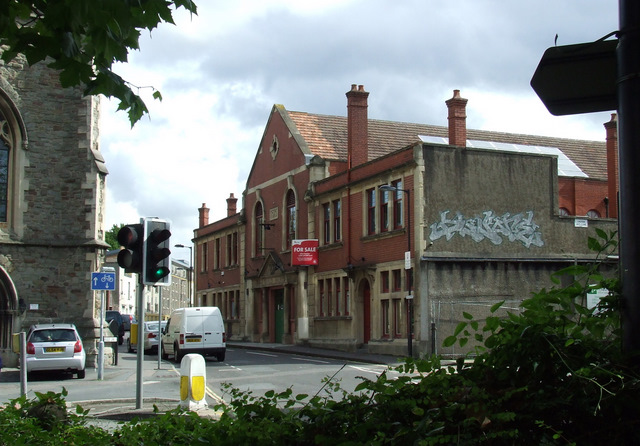
The Guild Heritage Building on Bragg's Lane

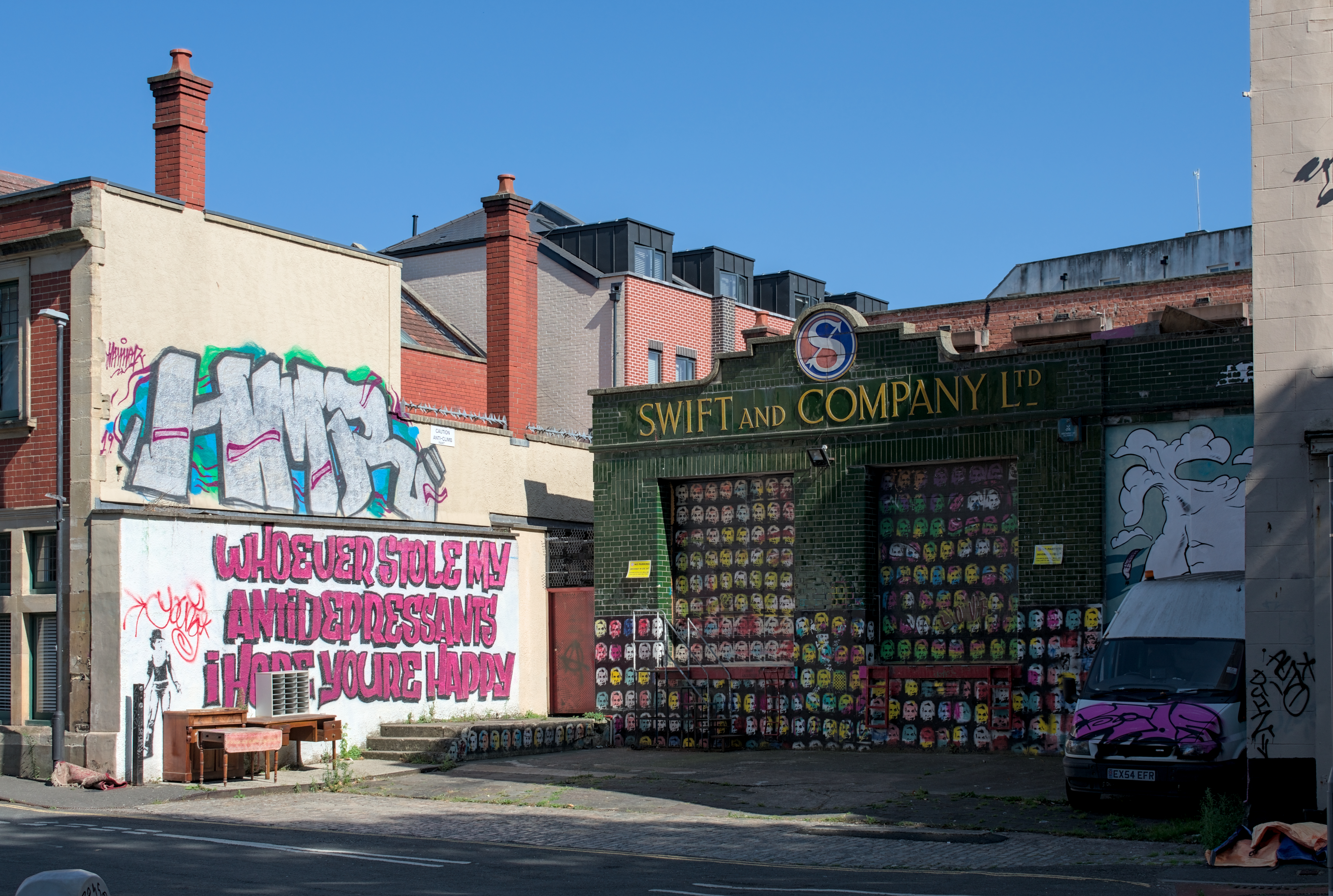
The Swift and Company Warehouse on Bragg's Lane

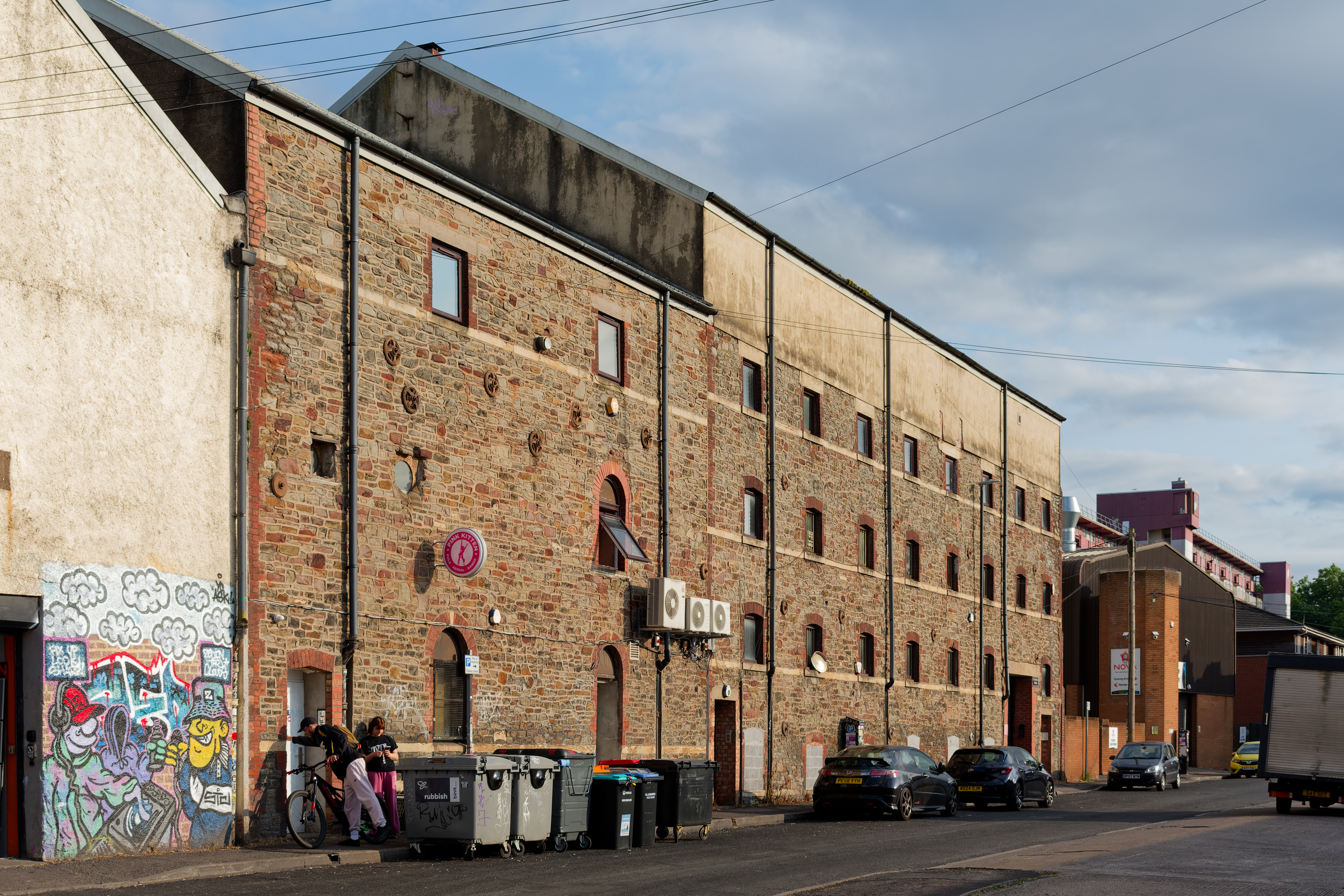
The Old Malt House on Little Ann Street

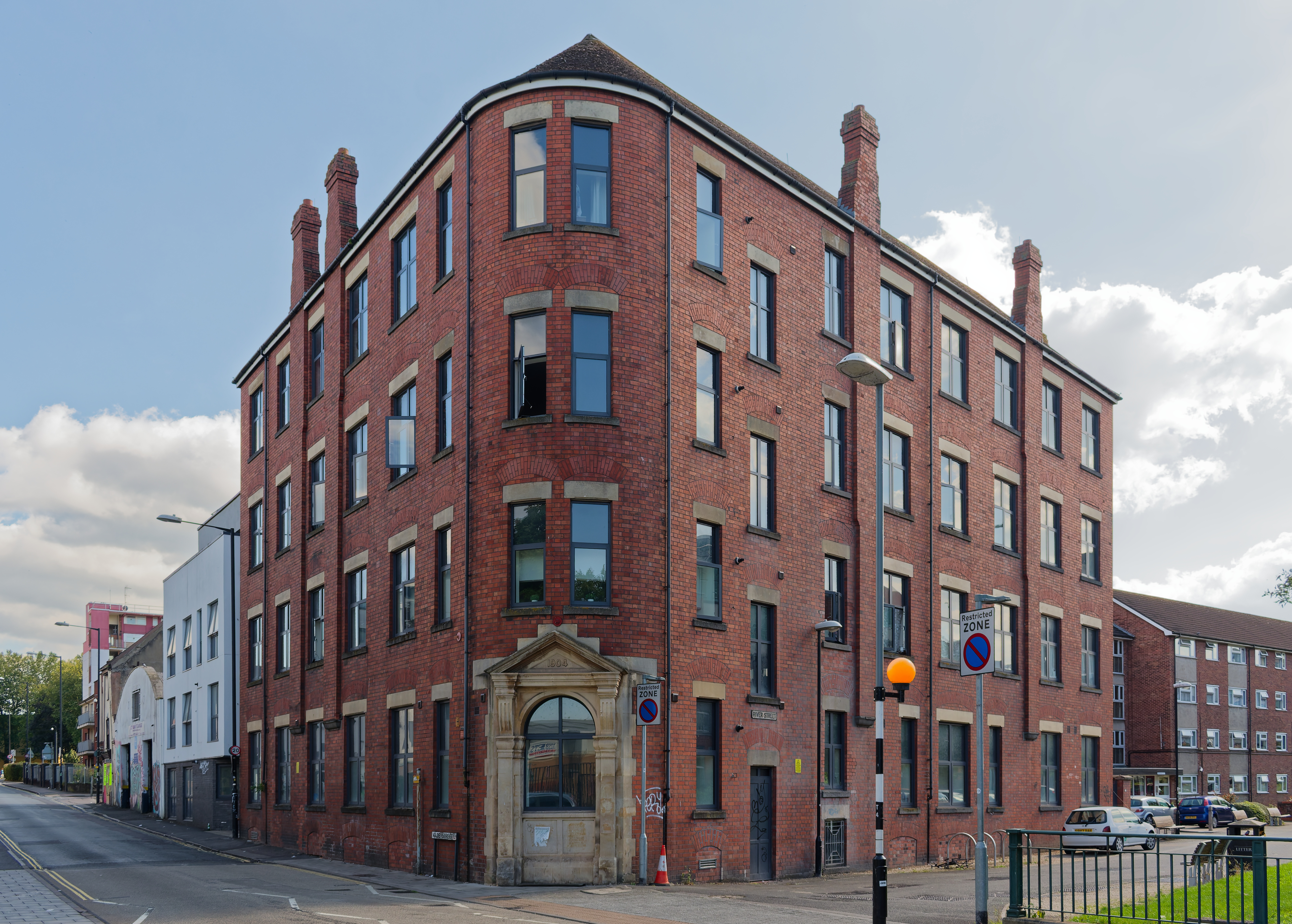
Redwood House on Wade Street

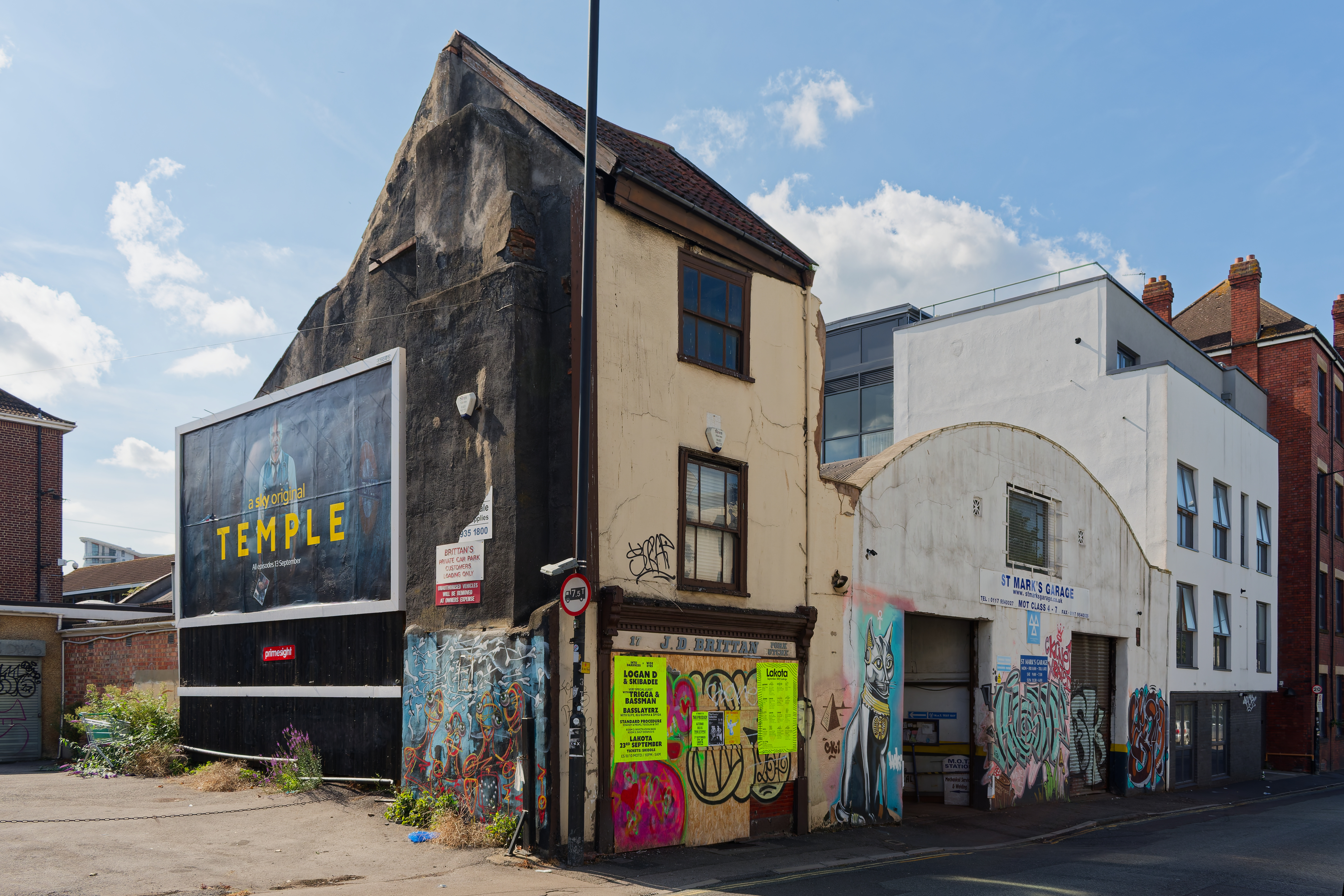
17 and 11–15 Wade Street, now demolished

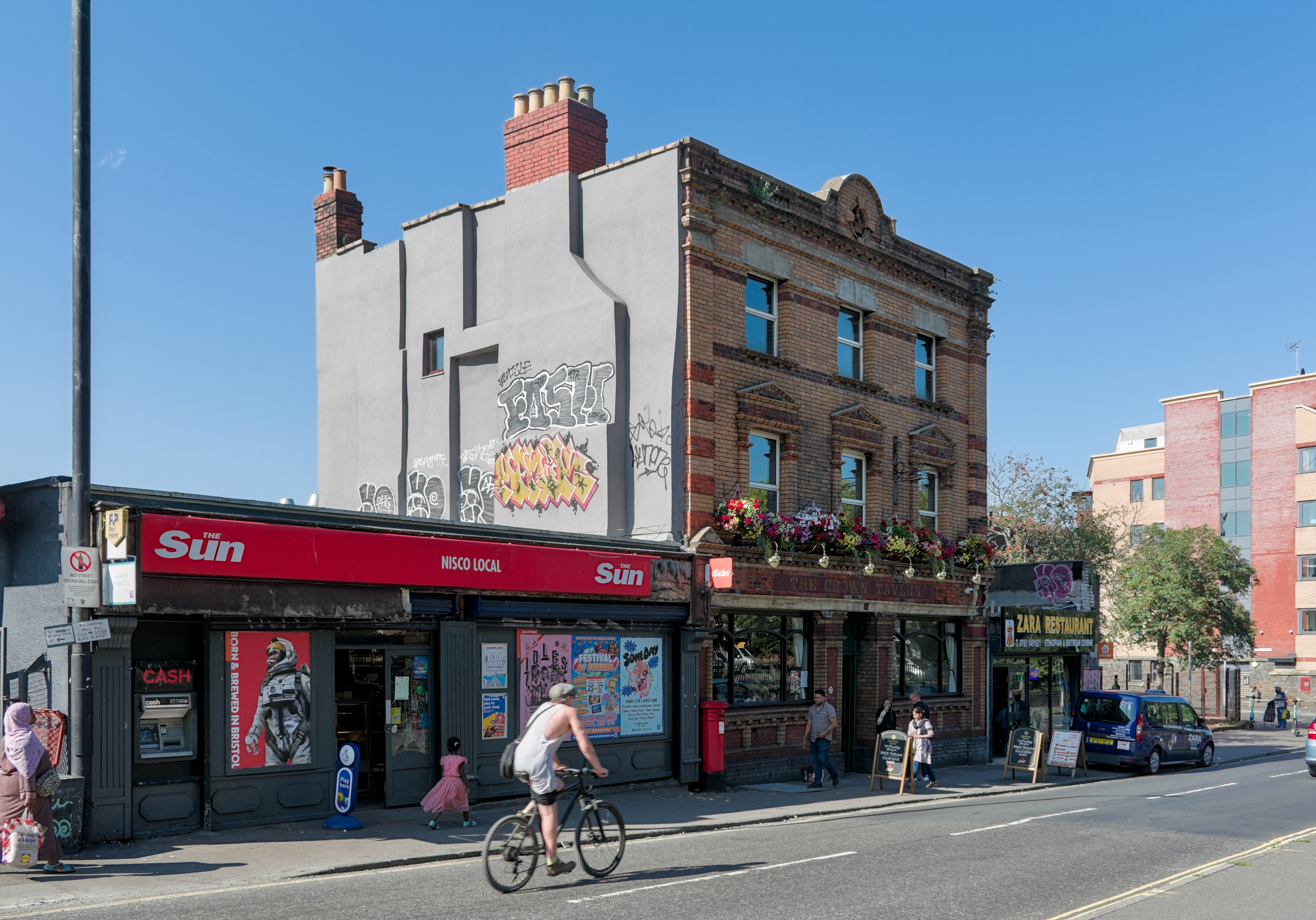
Crown Tavern on Lawford's Gate

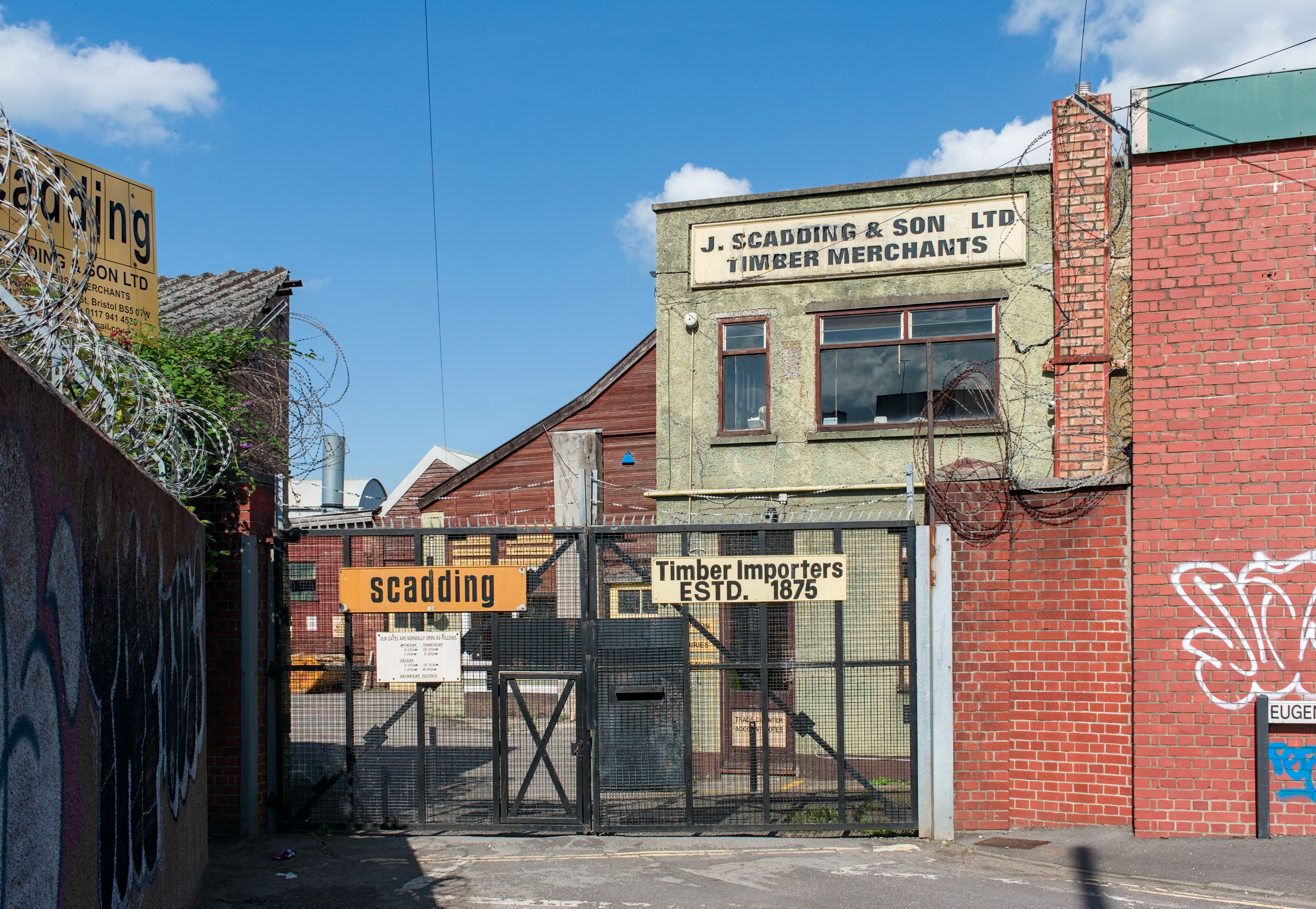
Scadding Timber Importers, former Crown Sawmills, on Eugene Street

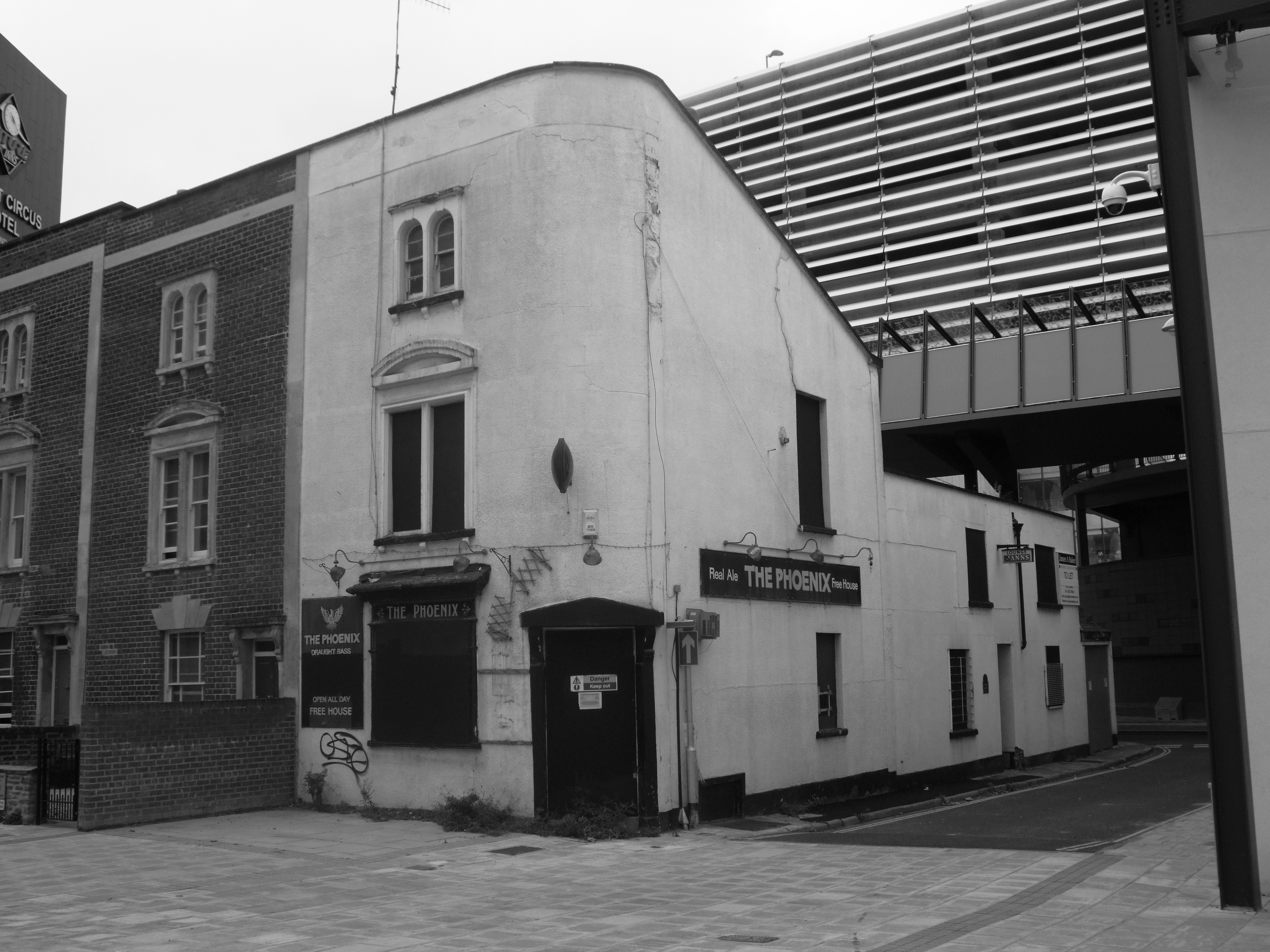
The Phoenix on Champion Square

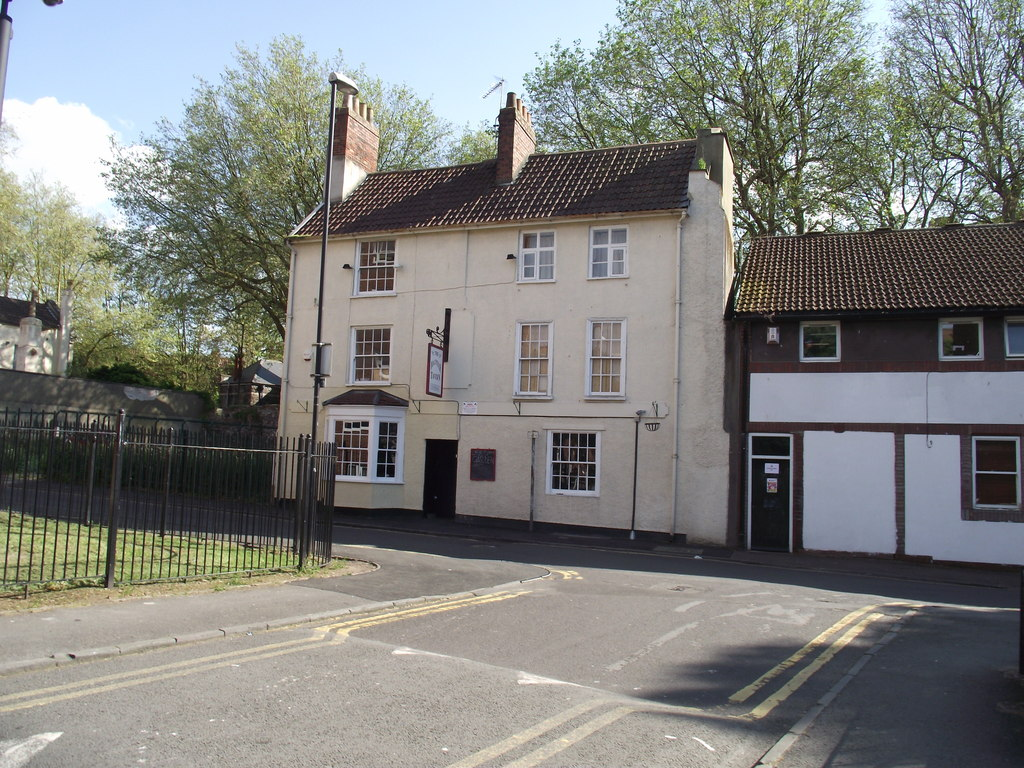
Volunteer Tavern on New Street

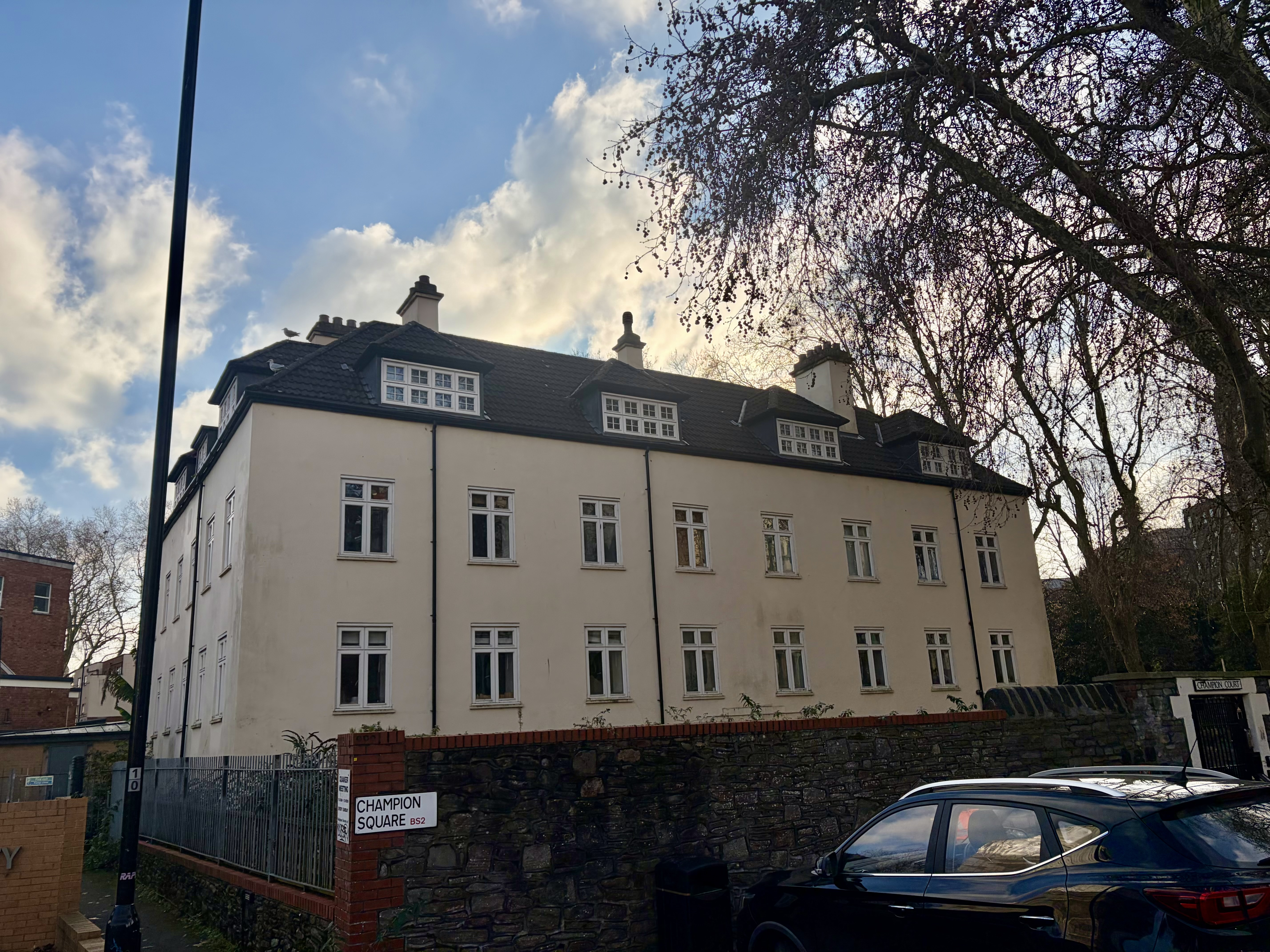
Champion Court on New Street (formerly New Street Flats). Previously a Quaker workhouse, school, and mission hall

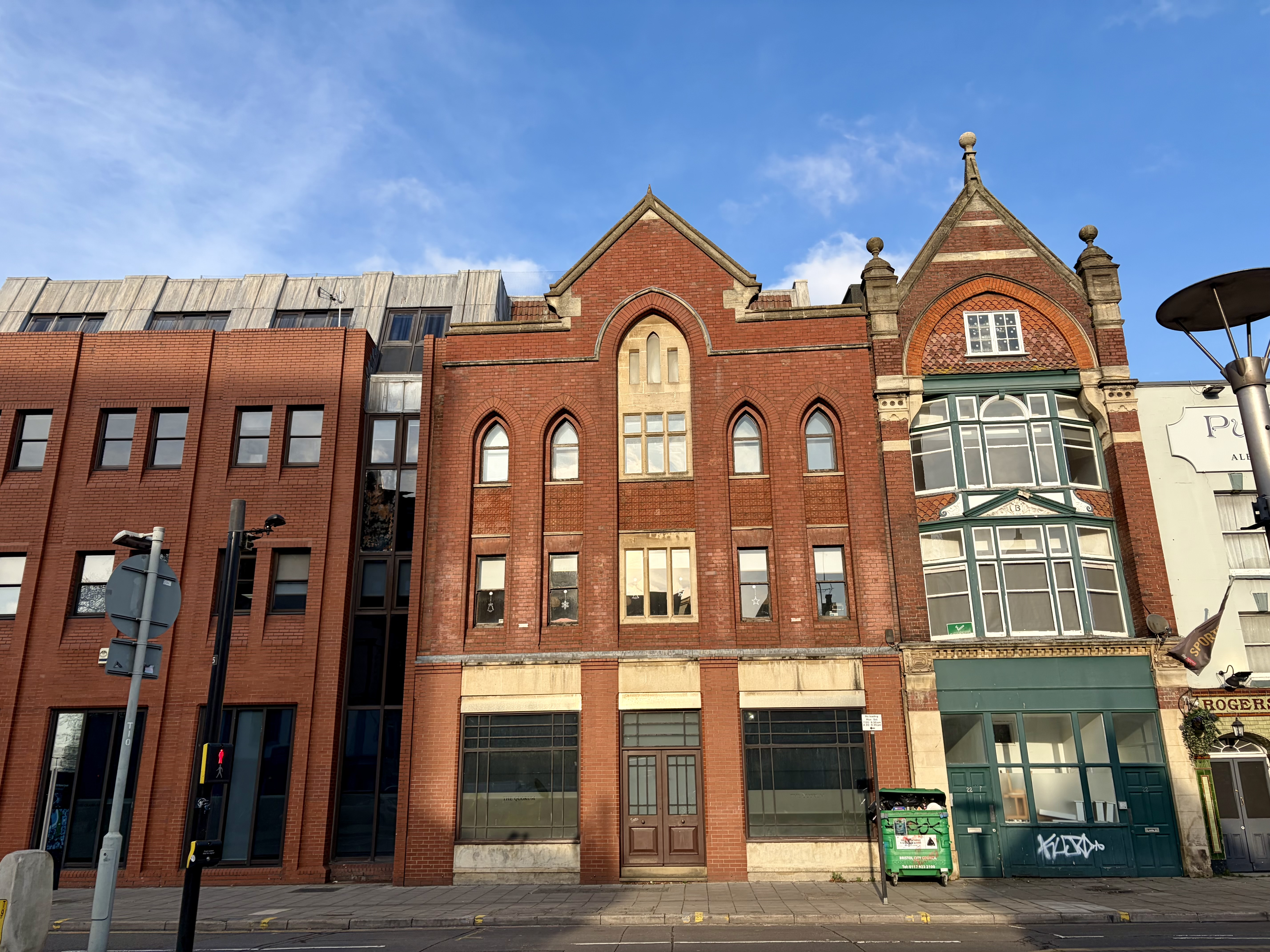
The Quorum (formerly Kings House) on Old Market Street

=== Religious buildings ===
St Jude's contains a number of active and former religious buildings representing various religions and denominations.

==== Churches ====
- St Nicholas of Tolentino Roman Catholic Church; founded in 1848 to serve Irish refugees, the current structure was consecrated in 1895.
- Great George Street Mission, a non-denominational mission.
- The Congregational Centre Chapel on Stapleton Road.
- Central Quaker Meeting House on Champion Square.
- St Mary's Orthodox Eritrean Church.
- Assemblies of the First Born on Goodhind Street, located in the former church hall of St Gabriel's Church.
- Logos House on Wade Street, a Salvation Army centre providing accommodation for homeless people.
- The head office of the Diocese of Clifton is located at Alexander House on Pennywell Road.
- Easton Family Christian Centre, church of Holy Trinity St Philip's, with St Gabriel, St Lawrence, and St Jude.

==== Mosques ====
- Albaseera Bristol Centre, a mosque located on Wade Street. The building historically housed The Sportsman's Arms public house.

==== Former religious buildings and sites ====
Some extant religious buildings have been repurposed for secular use:

- Trinity Centre, formerly the Holy Trinity Church (built 1829–1832), now a community arts centre and music venue.
- St Jude the Apostle Church, the original parish church for the district, built 1848–1849. It has been converted into private residences.
- Methodist Central Hall, facade retained, now housing apartments.
- Bristol Medical Mission operated from 7 Redcross Street from 1871 to 1966; the clinic was run from the mission alongside hymns and texts.
- Vestry Hall at Stapleton Road was used as a mission church and hall amongst many other uses over its lifetime. It is now residential.
- The Guild Heritage Building on Bragg's Lane was used as a church during the Second World War.
- Friends New Street Mission (active c. 1903–1914) was previously a workhouse, almshouse, and school; it is now flats.

Religious buildings and sites that have been demolished include:

- Lawford Gate Prison chapel, which was demolished with the prison in 1926 to be replaced by Gloucester House flats on Trinity Walk.
- Dolman's Burial Ground (cleared), near Vestry Lane. This was closed by the Burial Act of 1853 and was situated at the rear of the present Globe House and 30 Pennywell Road offices.
- St Matthias-on-the-Weir, built in 1846 and merged with St Jude's in 1940. It stood where the Temple Way dual carriageway now runs, adjacent to the road entrance to Champion Square and St Matthias Park.
- A Bible Christian chapel was on the former Gladstone Street from 1861 to 1969; the site is now open space next to Easton Academy.
- An unsectarian Church of Christ stood on Thrissel Street between 1903 and 1951; it is now the car park of Easton Leisure Centre.
- Faith Life Church used to meet at Easton Leisure Centre.
- The former chapel of the Kensington Baptist Church before it moved to the northern section of Stapleton Road; the site of the chapel on Thrissel Street is now City Business Park.
- A mission between Peel Street and Canning Street was located from 1903 to 1971 where the current Pennywell Road entrance to Riverside Park now exists.
- A mission chapel from St Jude, and later a mission hall, stood on the current playpark on Great Ann Street until the 1960s or 1970s, when the area was cleared for flats.
- St Clement's Church stood at the junction of Houlton Street and Newfoundland Road. Built in 1855, it was damaged by bombing during the Second World War and subsequently demolished.

== Social issues ==
Modern St Jude's is frequently described as being isolated from the city's more affluent areas, despite its proximity to the city centre, which was intensified by the development of Cabot Circus. Issues of overcrowding and a lack of green play space have also been noted as challenges for families living in the high-rise blocks.

The Frome Gateway Regeneration Framework has faced criticism from some locals who fear it will lead to the dispersal of existing communities and the loss of essential services such as the Salvation Army's Logos House.

=== Crime ===
St Jude's has a long-standing reputation for high crime rates, with postcodes on Wade Street identified in 2024 as being in the top 1% of the most dangerous in the country. In October 1995, the Avon and Somerset Police conducted dawn raids on 21 homes across the city, including flats in Ropewalk House, targeting suspected crack cocaine dealers. Residents of Ropewalk House subsequently petitioned the council for electronic entry systems to prevent intruders and drug users from accessing the building's communal stairwells.

In the 2020s, residents reported that the area's nightlife and music venues have exacerbated antisocial behaviour, with patrons urinating outside residential windows and consuming drugs in communal areas. Crime data from 2017 showed that Wade Street was a major hotspot for antisocial behaviour and violent offences within the Trinity area.

== Transport ==
Stapleton Road is the principal thoroughfare through St Jude's. The area is served by a number of bus services operated by First West of England, linking it to the city centre and the wider Bristol area. Rail access is provided by a number of nearby railway stations, as the area is only 1.35 kilometres (0.84 mi) north of Bristol Temple Meads station with an additional two local railway stations near to the area: Lawrence Hill station and Stapleton Road station.

St Jude's is located next to the M32 motorway, linking it to the M4 and M5 motorways. It is also bordered by the A4320 linking it to Bath.

== Controversies ==
There are a number of occasions where St Jude's has come under the spotlight due to controversial events, both modern and historic:

Bristol's "remaining" Colston statue

In January 2025 the Daily Express reported that five years on from the toppling of the former MP's statue, a bust of Edward Colston "hidden away near a pair of houses in Armoury Square, St Jude's". The pair of houses being Colston Villas where a replica of a terracotta original was installed in 1981. Edward Colston (2 November 1636 – 11 October 1721) was an English merchant, slave trader, philanthropist and Tory Member of Parliament. With growing awareness and disapproval in the late 20th century of his involvement in Britain's slave trade, there were protests and petitions for landmarks named after him to be renamed.

There was also a residential street named Colston Place nearby that was demolished after the Second World War. It was replaced by part of Robinson Drive and Pennywell Road. The Colston Arms was situated closeby at the junction of Pennywell Road and Beaumont Street.

Savid Javid's "moral cesspit" comments on Stapleton Road

Writing in The Times in September 2017 the then Minister for Communities and Local Government said he spent his childhood living in a flat on Stapleton Road, which he said was "part of the world that the tabloids have branded 'a moral cesspit' and 'Britain's most dangerous street'.

In April 2019 The Guardian reported local pushback with the by-line "Bristolians criticise attempt by home secretary to create tough back story in leadership bid". In December 2022 Javid announced his intention to stand down at the next General Election, which took place on 4 July 2024.

Modern evaluation of scapegoating the 'lower class' and 'outsiders' in the 1831 riots

The 1831 Bristol riots took place on 29–31 October 1831 and were part of the 1831 reform riots in England. Much of the city centre was burnt, up to £300,000 of damage caused and up to 250 casualties incurred. Lawford's Gate Gaol near Old Market was set on fire, as was "the toll house at St Philip's"; toll houses in St Philip's at this time were Lawford's Gate, West Street and Houlton Street. The Bishop of Bristol R Grey opposed reform and was responsible for the construction of the half-built Trinity Church, which needed Police protection from the angry crowd.

According to The Observer on 6 November 1831 thousands gathered: not "mechanics" but "boys, unemployed, wretched and vice in St Philips and Lawfords Gate. Not few women of abandoned character using violent language". The Guardian editorial on 5 November claims 30-50 of the "lowest rabble, Irishmen" set fire to the episcopal palace. Thomas notes the local popular myth was that rioters were from the surrounding and that night "the city was full of strangers" whereas most of them were well-known members of the local community; one eye-witness at the trial of Bristol's mayor said "the respectable part of the artisans were engaged in this riot". In Robinson's detailed description of the riots he noted of Lieut-Colonel Brereton, the commanding officer in Bristol during the riots, that "he knew a lot of the rioters by sight, and they knew him ... many of his neighbours were in Queen's Square that night. Everywhere he went the mob cheered him and people shook his hand". Thomas further notes the riots were "protected" by a crowd of merchants, professional men and tradesmen; Under-Sheriff Hare told the court "the crowd surrounding was of all classes, respectable, well-dressed people - the actual agents in the mischief were the lowest".

Correcting contemporary claims that the riots were driven by the 'lower classes' and outsiders - including the area of modern St Jude's that sat outside the city at this time - and the 'lower classes', modern conclusions are that the rioters were the Bristol working class in 'class unity' of purpose with an absentee middle class.

Controversial church branded 'dangerous cult'

In August 2024 Bristol World reported that the Universal Church of the Kingdom of God (UCKG) has taken on the former Bristol City Mission church on Great George Street in St Jude's, following its £475,000 purchase of the property. The news website said in 2022, ex-followers of the UCKG told the Guardian they felt pressure to give money and were told demons caused mental health issues and that in December 2023, a BBC Panorama investigation found the church tells its congregations it can help with mental health conditions by casting out evil spirits. Following slum clearance of housing the church building, relocated from Great Ann Street, opened in 1958 as part of Bristol City Mission and had become a focal point for food distribution.

Sex industry

In the 1850s or 1860s the Bristol Female Mission Society employed two people to work with prostitutes in "St James, St Judes and St Michael's, the three Bristol parishes identified as having the highest number of brothels and the worst problems with prostitution in the entire City" who were vulnerable due to lack of employment. Before this time sex work was noted as being focused on the city centre, especially between Broadmead and Bristol Bridge. By the mid Victorian period Gloucester Lane was noted as having "a notorious reputation based upon its drinking establishments, lodging houses and brothels" and was described as notorious in a contemporary guide to Bristol in 1893. In 2015 Burton notes the link between times of economic hardship and sex work, and presents an eyewitness account from 2014 of a former resident including historic accounts of "a number of brothels among the slums along Redcross Street, furthermore that along Wade Street the prostitutes 'wore their knickers halfway down their legs'".

Known as Vestry Lane on modern maps but otherwise unmarked, Whore Lane is hand annotated on the 1855 map on the Bristol City Council website. At this time the lane led from Eugene Street, behind the St Philip workhouse to a former burial ground that had been cleared by 1848. Sexualised street names are well documented in Bristol but studies have focused on the old city.

Burton discusses a period after the construction of the ring road cut the area off from the city centre and triggered decline, framing this as a Old Market having "reverted to its 19th century extremes of Virtue and Vice", noting the opening of massage parlours on Redcross Street and West Street, alongside a licensed adult shop. Burton asserts the link between the twentieth century association between the Old Market area and the sex industry coinciding with decline of local cinemas. The Tatler cinema on the corner of Redcross Street and Captain Carey's Lane developed a reputation for screening sub-pornographic films. After the Tatler closed this trade transferred to the King's Cinema around the corner on Old Market before it closed in 1976. The footprint of both cinemas is broadly covered by The Quorum office block today.

== In popular culture ==
Location filming in St Jude's includes:

- 1962 film Some People starring Kenneth More was partly filmed in the Palace Hotel on the corner of Lawford Street and West Street. Scenes filmed in the pub included Harry H Corbett who, by the time the film was released, was better known as the son in Steptoe and Son. Intended as a promotional vehicle for the Duke of Edinburgh award scheme, the "$700,000 production" was made for "less than $200,000" with those waiving fees including Kenneth More.
- The former Waggon & Horses pub on Stapleton Road was an exterior filming location for the Nag's Head pub in Only Fools and Horses, where Del is shown being dragged out by the police; the pub has since been demolished for housing. Other filming locations for the TV series include the Old Market roundabout.
- The 2017 BBC drama Three Girls was partly filmed on Goodhind Street and Beaumont Street.
- Parts of the second season of TV show War of the Worlds were filmed in several locations in the area in July 2021.
- The Outlaws series two filmed scenes at the Pennywell Project in 2022, doubling as a police station.
- In January 2023, filming for The Lazarus Project took place at St Matthias House on Champion Square.
- A film based on a true story in present-day Bristol, Surviving Earth, was partly filmed on Little Ann Street in November 2023.
- In March 2024, filming around St Jude's was believed to be for The Crow Girl on Paramount+.
- TV series The Dream Lands filmed in the former Scadding Timber Yard in St Jude's in April 2025.
- In July 2025, the Bristol Film Office noted three consecutive nights filming on Eugene Street for an unnamed project set in 1970s Michigan.

A Productions (formerly A for Animation) was set up on Little Ann Street in 1985. The studio is now split across two Bristol locations, one of which is at Old Market. Studio productions have included titles for Playbus and the Antiques Roadshow, all episodes of Tweenies, as well as Spitting Image, Sesame Street specials, and promos for Madonna and Elton John.

== Notable people ==
Well-known people who lived or worked in what is now St Jude's include:

- Abraham Darby (1677-1717), British ironmaster, moved to Bristol in 1699 and co-founded the Bristol Brass Company at Bapist Mills. The southern part of the works are where Universal House on Pennywell Road now operates. His work here would help start the Industrial Revolution
- Whittingham family of Earl's Mead on Pennywell Lane (now Pennywell Road):
  - William Whittingham (1740 or 1741-1801), skinner and philanthropist, father of Sarah and Samuel, below. Lived on Pennywell Lane, more specifically at Earl's Mead, until his death in 1801. In 1796 he was President of the Dolphin Society, the first of the 'Colston societies' and at the time considered a Tory society.
  - Sarah Whittingham, wife of Tory for Colchester then Bristol MP Richard Hart Davis, mother of Hart Davis who was elected unopposed as Tory MP for Colchester at age 21. Lived at Earlsmead (sic) on Pennywell Road.
  - Lieutenant-General Sir Samuel Ford Whittingham, British army officer who served in the Napoleonic Wars then as Commander in Chief at Madras (Chennai). Earlier, in 1797 he was enrolled at Bristol in the mounted volunteers, a force organised among the wealthier citizens following a threatened French invasion. Sources note he lived, went to school and joined the mounted volunteers in Bristol but do not explicitly confirm he lived with his father and older sister at Earl's Mead on Pennywell Road when younger.
- John Kimber, English slave trader tried and acquitted in 1792 of torturing a teenage female slave. The case was raised in Parliament by William Wilberforce and established the legal precedent that those who killed slaves could be tried for murder. He lived at 27 Redcross Street where the Bow Street Runners first tried to arrest him.
- Hannah More (1745–1833), English religious writer and abolitionist; she took a strong interest in this destitute area and left one tenth of her estate, along with a subscription from her followers, to build Holy Trinity Church and a school on Trinity Road opposite. The school subsequently moved to New Kingsley Road where it is still named for her.
- Sir Thomas Lawrence (1769–1830), English painter and fourth president of the Royal Academy; he lived on Redcross Street until the age of 10. Painted Richard Hart Davis, above.
- EW Godwin (1833-1886), English architect-designer, was born at 12 Old Market Street, on the corner of Captain Carey's Lane, and spent 'part of his childhood' at Earl's Mead House, now the site of an office building at 162 Pennywell Road. Later, in 1855, Godwin listed 'Earl's mead-house' as his address but by 1857 had moved to Ireland and described the house as a past residence.
- Amelia Dyer (1837–1896), British serial killer and baby farmer; she lived on Trinity Road.
- PC Richard Hill (died 1869), City of Bristol Police Constable; he worked at Trinity Road police station and was murdered in the line of duty on Gloucester Lane.
- Edward Packer (1848–1887), chocolate manufacturer; he lived and established his chocolate-making company on Armoury Square in 1881. Following mergers, H. J. Packer now trades as Elizabeth Shaw.
- W. G. Grace (1848–1915), English cricketer and general practitioner who had his practice on Stapleton Road near present-day Easton Leisure Centre.
- Hardwicke Rawnsley (1851-1920), Anglican priest and co-founder of the National Trust, was a mission curate from 1875-8 for a small part of St Barnabas parish known as Newfoundland Gardens. This open ground of squatters comprised tumble down low huts, around muck heaps and streets one would 'wade through'. Stretching from Newfoundland Lane to the Frome, the area of the colony corresponds to much of modern day Riverside Park and the M32/A4032.
- Sarah Ann Henley (1862–1948), barmaid who survived jumping from the Clifton Suspension Bridge in a suicide attempt; she lived at 30 Twinnell Street at the time, now Wills Drive.
- Israel Zangwill (1864–1926), British author; he attended Redcross School.
- H.J. Wilkins (1865-1941), British vicar and scholar, was curate then Vicar of St Jude's from 1890-1900, living at 39 Little George Street and was an advocate for better housing for the poor. Wilkins was the first person in modern times to write about Edward Colston's links to the Atlantic slave trade.
- Ada Vachell (1866–1923), Bristol worker for people with disabilities who built the Guild Heritage Building on Bragg's Lane as part of her charity the Guild of the Brave Poor Things.
- The Bristol Strike Organising Committee had its office at the British Workman on New Street, St Judes, during the Bristol Strike Wave of 1889-1890 and afterwards. Organisers included Enid Stacy, Helena Born, Miriam Daniell and Robert Nicol.
- Harry Dolman OBE (1897–1977), managing director of Brecknell, Dolman & Rogers, headquartered on Pennywell Road.
- Archibald Leach (1904-1986), production assistant and later actor, had his first job as lime-lighter at age 13 at the Empire Theatre, Old Market. The Empire was on the edge of present day St Jude's, on the junction of Captain Carey's Lane with Redcross Street.
- Amir Esmaeil (1943–2005), gym owner on Redcross Street who trained boxing world champion Glenn Catley and Commonwealth boxing champion Ross Hale.

== See also ==
- Subdivisions of Bristol
