= Miriam Daniell =

English strike organiser and radical thinker

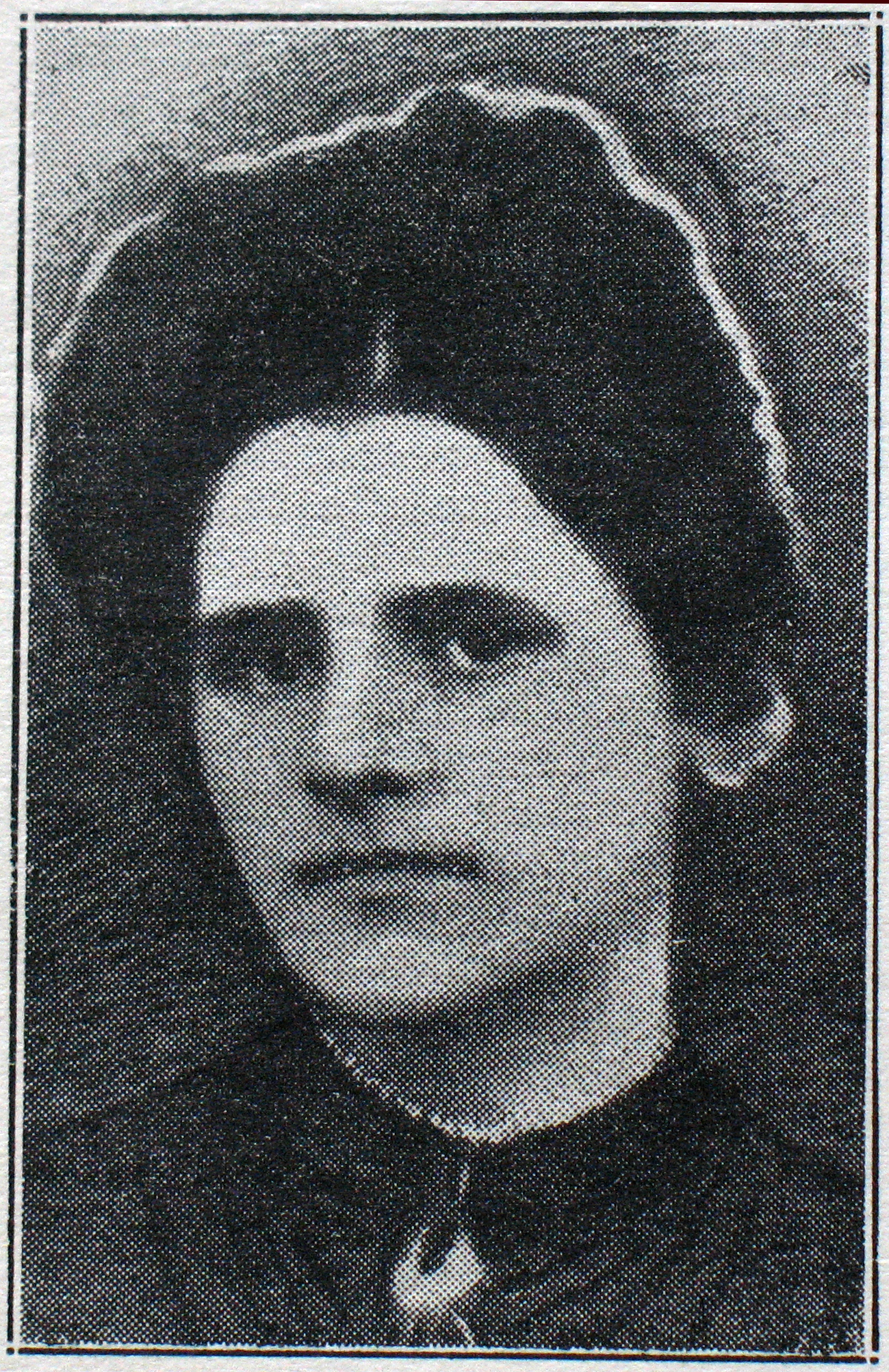
- Born: Elizabeth Miriam Wheeler; October 29, 1861; Bristol
- Died: April 19, 1894 (aged 32); San Francisco, USA

Elizabath Miriam Wheeler Daniell (29 October 1861 – 19 April 1894) was an English strike organiser and radical thinker from Bristol. She gained prominence during the great Bristol floods of 1889 and the Bristol Strike Wave of 1889–90. Miriam emigrated to the USA with her lovers Helena Born and Robert Nicol in 1890 to avoid a scandal in conservative, Victorian Bristol. Miriam died in San Francisco in 1894, aged 32.

Miriam's legacy has variously been interpreted as one of the first free love 'hippies', an early feminist radical or socialist, or as a prominent thinker in the new unionism agenda. In the New Statesman in 2017 of the "menage-a-trois" they reported "these rebels prefigured everything from free love to modern feminism to eco-politics; and, in those Bristol living arrangements, possibly a dash of Habitat-style consumerism as well."

The factual story of Miriam's life was written by Professor Sheila Rowbotham as Rebel Crossings in 2016. The book also chronicled the lives of her partners after Miriam's death: Helena Born and her later partners Helen Tufts and William Bailie, as well as Robert Nicol and his later partner Gertrude Dix.

A fictionalised account of a short period of Miriam's life in Bristol was the subject of a short story in 2022 by historical novelist Cynthia Sally Haggard, told from the perspective of her later divorced husband: solicitor Edward Daniell. Cynthia is a member of the Haggard family and married to Robert Nicols grandson.

Miriam's nephew was Major Sir Mortimer Wheeler, husband of noted archaeologist Tessa Verney Wheeler, and her great-nephew was QC Michael Mortimer Wheeler. Her ancestor was sixteenth century martyr John Rogers.

LGBT historian Elisa Rolle asserts that Miriam's great-niece was American film-maker Elizabeth Wheeler, in turns cousin of Hollywood photographer George Daniell and daughter of newspaper magnate John N Wheeler.

== Family life and divorce ==
Born Elizabeth Miriam Wheeler into a wealthy Clifton family of tea importers and grocers, Miriam and her siblings were educated by a governess from Zurich. Her father was a leading member of the Pembroke Road Congregational Chapel where, at age 19, she married local solicitor Edward Daniell. Miriam's older brother was radicalised at University in Scotland and one of her sisters went on to join the Bristol Socialist Society at the same meeting as Enid Stacy.

With husband Edward Miriam lived in Westbury-on-Trym and then at 28 Hampton Park, Redland. Following a holiday to Scotland in summer 1889, where she had previously had surgery for an unknown illness, Miriam returned to Bristol with young socialist Robert Nicol protégé and 'close companion' of Patrick Geddes. Nicol moved into the family home before moving to 9 Louisa Street near Old Market, a two-up two-down in the working-class district of St Philip's, and was shortly joined there by both Miriam and Helena Born. Miriam considered the house at Louisa Street to be basic and unsanitary.

The move was seen as a scandal at the time, but Rowbotham reports that perception of the arrangement was softened by Helena's presence in the household.

When Miriam discovered she was pregnant in 1890 she felt this scandal would be too acute, even in more liberal circles, so all three emigrated to the USA later that year. Socialist women's private lives were open to particular scrutiny at that time.

Robert Nicol was cited in the later divorce proceedings, brought by Edward Daniell, which concluded in 1894. There is no indication that Miriam's pregnancy became public knowledge and was not noted in the divorce proceedings.

== Political life in Bristol ==
Miriam and Helena Born joined the Bristol Women's Liberal Association in 1888 and by February 1889 Miriam was hosting discussion events in her Redland home. Both went on to join the Bristol Socialist Society in 1890 with Miriam serving on its committee.

The Bristol flood of 1889 left a string of new, working-class communities along the River Frome under water from Broadmead to Stapleton. Wetlands, such as Earl's Mead, being developed for housing estates and the Bristol Corporation came under intense scrutiny from the middle classes for failing to address east Bristol flooding following major flooding events as recently as 1882. Miriam took a prominent role in flooding relief efforts: fronting the public appeal for funds and relief operations being split between her Redland home and the Newfoundland Mission established by Rawnsley in the previous decade. Direct work with some of the poorer communities in the city gave middle class Miriam and Helena a new perspective in their emerging political awareness.

Following the floods Miriam spent the summer of 1889 in Edinburgh and returned with Glaswegian medical student Robert Nichol. Miriam, Helena and Robert were living at 9 Louisa Street by the end of the year. As the Bristol Strike Wave of 1889-90 began to heat up all three took active roles on the Bristol Strike Committee, taking an office in the British Workman on New Street in St Jude's, and on local committees of the National Union of Gasworkers and General Labourers. Miriam again took a higher profile role to Helena and Robert’s background roles. Miriam, alongside Hugh Holmes Gore, directly engaged in negotiations with major local employers and was criticised through local newspapers by vested interests in the city: Miriam was accused of single-handedly triggering the Great Western Cotton Factory workers strike.

Miriam, Helena and Robert deepened their involvement in the new unionism movement: writing pamphlets, hosting visiting dignitaries and supporting striking workers. Miriam delivered lectures including Cosmopolitanism not Patriotism, and Evolution of women, Nihilism and Socialism and Art. Miriam’s written works included The Truth about Chocolate Factories or Modern White Slavery; and a treatise on the importance of sex equality to the success of new unionism.

Miriam and Helena developed a close friendship with Edward Carpenter. In 1890 Miriam, Helena and Robert moved to Lower Eastville adjacent to Robert Gilliard's house and were frequent visitors, alongside others.

== Emigration and death ==
By May 1890 Miriam was pregnant and the three concluded that this would be one scandal too many, Victorian Bristol being a socially conservative place. They moved to Boston, USA, setting sail on 20 August 1890 where 'Sunrise' Miriam Elinor Nicol was born. In 1893 they relocated to rural California and built a house on a commune that was quickly destroyed. By this time Edward Daniell was pursuing their divorce through the British courts, citing Robert Nicol as a co-respondent.

Miriam's medical condition degraded and she sought medical treatment, an unknown operation, in San Francisco where she died on 19 April 1894.

Edward Daniell was granted his divorce by the Supreme Court of Judicature on 30 April 1894.
