= What Child Is This? =

Christmas carol

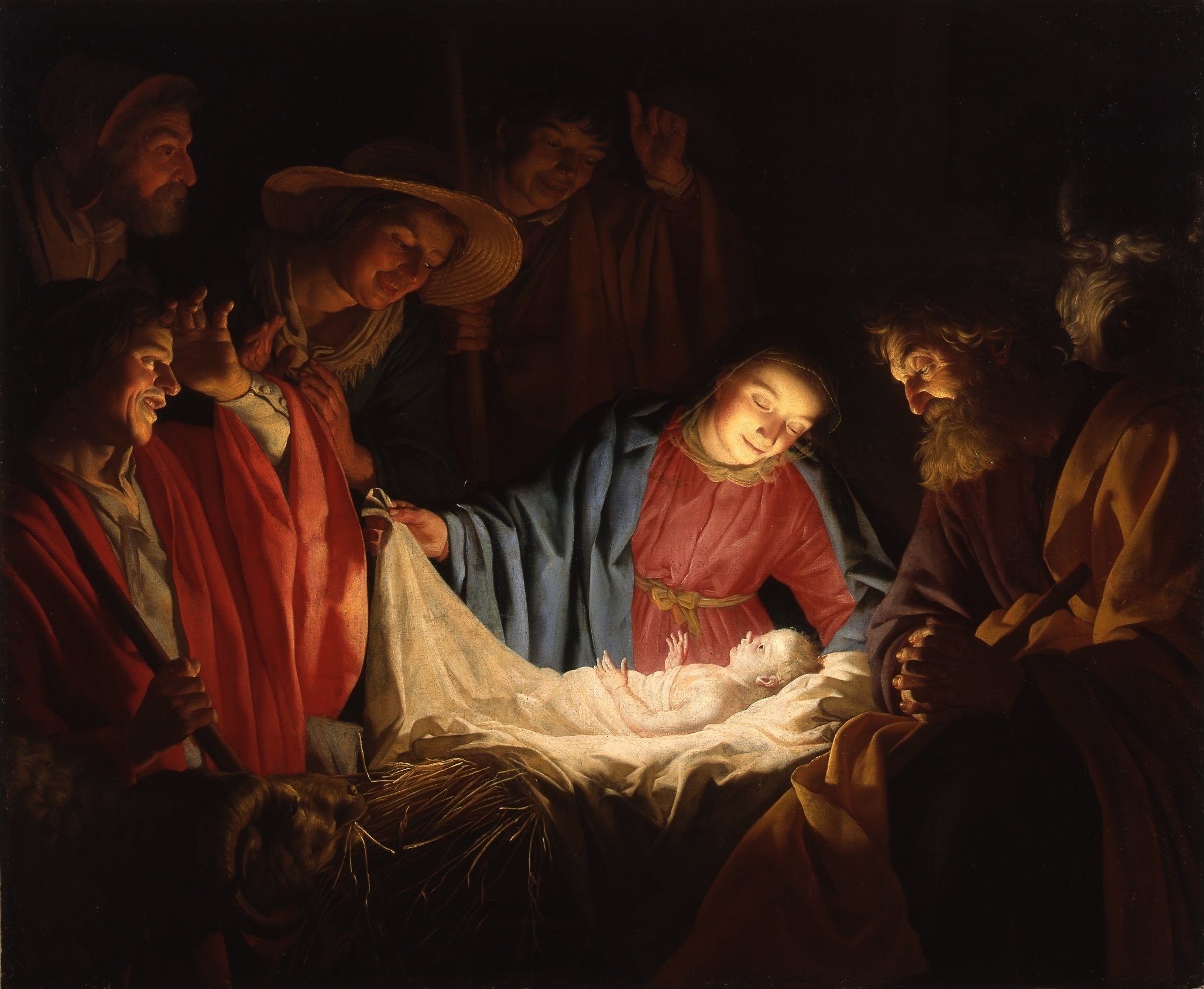
- The Adoration of the Shepherds by Gerard van Honthorst
- Genre: Hymn
- Written: 1865
- Text: William Chatterton Dix
- Based on: Isaiah 9:6-7
- Meter: 8.7.8.7 with refrain
- Melody: "Greensleeves"
- Published: 1871

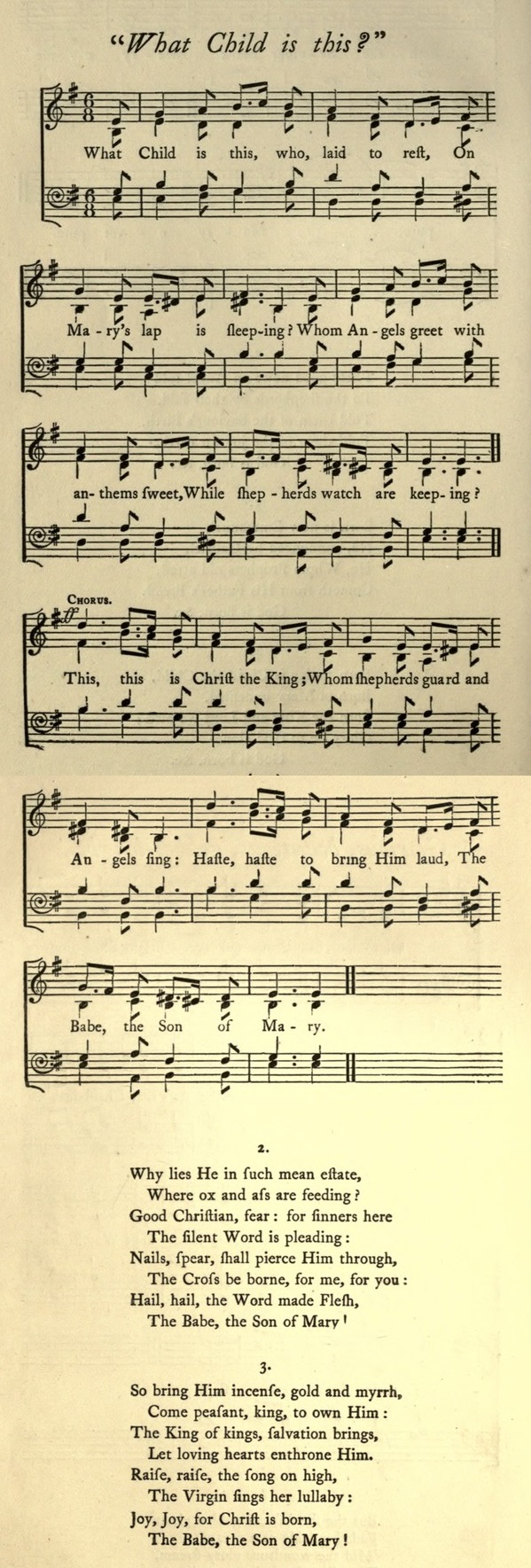
What Child is this? (1870), set to the tune of "Greensleeves

"What Child Is This?" is a Christmas carol with lyrics written by William Chatterton Dix in 1865 and set to the tune of "Greensleeves", a traditional English folk song (possibly by Richard Jones), in 1871. Although written in Great Britain, the carol today is more popular in the United States than its country of origin.

== Lyrics ==
Tune: Greensleeves

=== Composition ===
The first verse poses a rhetorical question in the first half, with the response coming in the second half. The second verse contains another question that is answered, while the final verse is a universal appeal to everyone urging them "to accept Christ". The carol's melody has been described as "soulful", "haunting and beautiful" in nature.

=== Context ===
The context of the carol centres around the Adoration of the Shepherds who visit during the Nativity of Jesus. The questions posed in the lyrics reflect what the shepherds were possibly pondering to themselves when they encountered Jesus, with the rest of the carol providing a response to their questions.

=== Text ===
What child is this, who, laid to rest
On Mary's lap, is sleeping?
Whom angels greet with anthems sweet
While shepherds watch are keeping?
This, this is Christ the King,
Whom shepherds guard and angels sing;
Haste, haste to bring him laud,
The babe, the son of Mary.

Why lies he in such mean estate
Where ox and ass are feeding?
Good Christian, fear: for sinners here
The silent Word is pleading.
Nails, spear shall pierce him through,
The cross be borne for me, for you.
Hail, hail the Word made flesh,
The babe, the son of Mary.

So bring him incense, gold, and myrrh,
Come, peasant, king, to own him;
The King of kings salvation brings,
Let loving hearts enthrone him.
Raise, raise a song on high,
The virgin sings her lullaby.
Joy, joy, for Christ is born,
The babe, the son of Mary.

== Background and influences ==
At the time he was writing the lyrics to "What Child Is This?" in 1865, William Chatterton Dix was working as the manager of an insurance company. He was afflicted by an unexpected and severe illness that resulted in him being bedridden and suffering from severe depression. His near-death experience brought about a spiritual renewal in him while he was recovering. During this time, he read the Bible comprehensively and was inspired to author hymns like "Alleluia! Sing to Jesus!" and "As with Gladness Men of Old". The precise time in 1865 when he wrote the poem "The Manger Throne" is disputed. While the St. Petersburg Times details how Dix penned the work after reading the Gospel for Epiphany that year (Matthew 2:1–12) recounting the journey of the Biblical Magi; Singer's Library of Song: Medium Voice contends that it was actually authored during the Christmas of 1865.

== History ==
Although written in 1865, "What Child Is This?" was only first published six years later in 1871, when it featured in Christmas Carols New and Old, a "prestigious" and "influential" collection of carols that was published in the United Kingdom. The hymnal was edited by Henry Ramsden Bramley and John Stainer; even though it is not known with certainty who paired the three stanzas from "The Manger Throne" with the music from "Greensleeves", the third edition of The Christmas Encyclopedia by William D. Crump and Stories of the Great Christmas Carols both suggest that Stainer – who was also responsible for "harmoniz[ing] the musical setting" – may have done so.

== See also ==
- List of Christmas carols
