= Gertrude Dix =

British writer and socialist (1867–1950)

- Born: Gertrude Mary Dix; 12 December 1867; Kennington, London, UKGBI
- Died: 30 October 1950 (aged 82); San Francisco, California, US
- Other name: Gertrude Mary Nicol
- Occupation: Writer
- Spouse: Robert Nicol (m. 1903)
- Children: 3
- Father: William Chatterton Dix
- Relatives: John Ross Dix (grandfather)

Gertrude Mary Dix (married name Nicol; 12 December 1867 – 30 October 1950) was a British writer and socialist active in Great Britain and America.

== Early life ==
Dix was born on 12 December 1867 in Kennington, London to William Chatterton Dix, a hymnwriter and writer of devotional works who was at the time employed as an insurance clerk, and Juliet Dix (née Wartnaby). Through her father, Dix was the granddaughter of the surgeon, writer and poet John Ross Dix.

The family moved to Bristol sometime before 1871, and Dix was raised in a middle class High church Anglican household. The eldest of eight siblings, Dix was the older sister of the illustrator Hilda Dix Sandford and Frank Dix, a writer, actor and director.

== Career ==
As a young adult, Dix joined the Bristol Socialist Society, the Christian Socialists and later the Bristol Fabian Society. An admirer of Havelock Ellis, Dix adopted Ellis' ideals of female emancipation and sexual freedom. During the Bristol strikes waves of 1889 and 1890, Dix was elected to the workers' organising committee where she met the socialists Helena Born, Miriam Daniell, and her future husband, Robert Nicol.

On 9 January 1891, Dix was asked to speak about Plato to the Bristol Socialist Society. As means of independence, Dix left home to train as a nurse the same year. Qualifying after a year of training, Dix resigned within a few months of working as a nurse due to the harsh working and living conditions. In 1893, Dix published a well received article in the The Westminster Review in which documented her experience and called for reform, and in March 1896 spoke on the subject at the Socialist Club in London.

By June 1892, Dix was living in Limpsfield and was working for the civil servant and Fabian Sydney Olivier, 1st Baron Olivier as teacher for his daughters Margery, Brynhild and Daphne.

== Personal life ==
On 8 April 1903, Dix married Robert Nicol with whom she had three children.

On 30 October 1950, Dix died in San Francisco aged 82.

== Bibliography ==
- Dix, Gertrude (1895). The Girl from the Farm. London: John Lane.
- Dix, Gertrude (1897). The Portrait of Daphne.
- Dix, Gertrude (1900). Veronica's Mill.
- Dix, Gertrude (1900). The Image Breakers.
