= Helen Tufts Bailie =

American social reformer

- Helen Tufts Bailie, ca. 1928
- Born: Helen Matilda Tufts; January 9, 1874; Newark, New Jersey, United States
- Died: May 1962 (aged 88)
- Known for: Social reformer

Helen Tufts Bailie (January 9, 1874 – May 1962) was an American social reformer and activist. Tufts is known for outing the Daughters of the American Revolution for blacklisting certain individuals and organizations in 1928. This controversy led Tufts to be banned from the organization and to become an advocate for women's, labor, and social rights.

== Early life ==
Helen Matilda Tufts was born in Newark, New Jersey in 1874. Her father was a Unitarian minister and her mother was a suffragist. In 1875, the family moved to Massachusetts, where Helen graduated from Cotting High School in Lexington in 1892. After graduation, she worked as a proofreader and typesetter at Riverside Press. She then moved on to be a secretary at Houghton Mifflin in Boston. In April 1895 she met Helena Born, a writer, anarchist, and labor organizer. Born became a major influence on Tufts' lifestyle and activities; Tufts became vegetarian, acquired an interest in the writing of Walt Whitman, and became active in dress reform, anarchism, communism, and socialism.

== Daughters of the American Revolution ==
In 1915 Tufts joined the Anne Adams Tufts chapter of the Daughters of the American Revolution (DAR). In 1927 she discovered that the DAR maintained lists of "doubtful speakers." These lists included the organizations such as the National Federation of Women's Clubs, the American Peace Society, and individuals like Jane Addams, William Allen White and Mary Wooley. After investigating, she made the lists public in February 1928.

In March 1928 she wrote a pamphlet called "Our Threatened Heritage" to protest the blacklists. Fifteen DAR members, called the Committee on Protest and headed by Bailie, signed the pamphlet and helped to distribute it throughout the United States. Both members and officers of three greater Boston area chapters were involved in the group. At the annual DAR Congress in Washington, D.C., Tufts was accused of "disturbing the harmony" of the DAR organization and harming its reputation, after the pamphlet distributions and her persistence pushing for an explanation about the blacklists. One year later she failed to appeal for reinstatement in DAR.

== Later life ==
After Tufts struggles with DAR and the blacklisting controversy, she continued to be active in the early women's movement and social movements. She formed a letter writing campaign to legalize birth control and in 1935, Tufts organized a campaign against legislation requiring Massachusetts teachers to take an oath affirming the United States and state constitutions. In 1947, Tufts and Bailie moved to Nantucket. The couple moved again in 1954 due to Tufts deteriorating eyesight and Bailie's Alzheimer-like symptoms, moving to Yellow Springs, Ohio to live with their daughter and her husband, Water Jolly. In 1956 Tufts book, Darling Daughter, a satire about the DAR blacklists and the red scare, was published.

== Personal life ==
Through Born, Tufts met William Bailie, originally from Belfast, who lived in and owned a vegetarian restaurant co-op. Born and Bailie were romantically involved. In January 1901 Born was diagnosed with uterine cancer and died later that month. Bailie and Tufts lived together starting in the fall of 1901, and in October 1908 the two married. Bailie started a basket weaving business, which he ran until his retirement in 1946. The couple had two children: daughter Helena Isabel, born in 1914, and son Terrill (nicknamed Sonny), born in 1916. The latter died of spinal meningitis at age 3.

== Death ==
In May 1957 William Bailie died in a nursing home. Tufts moved to Miami, Florida in 1958 and later to Ft. Lauderdale. She died in 1962.

== In popular culture ==
Sheila Rowbotham's Rebel Crossings: New Women, Free Lovers, and Radicals in Britain and the United States is an account of the activist life of Tufts, along with William Bailie (her husband), Helena Born, Miriam Daniell, Gertrude Dix, and Robert Nicol.

== Works ==
- Darling Daughter: A Satire (1956) New York: Greenwich Book Publishers
- Perverted Patriotism: A Story of D.A.R. Stewardship (1929) Cambridge, Mass.
- Our Threatened Heritage: A Letter to the Daughters of the American Revolution (1928) Cambridge, Mass.: D.A.R. Committee of Protest
