= William Chatterton Dix =

British hymnwriter and writer(1837–1898)

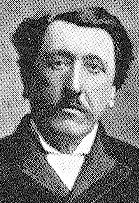
- Born: 14 June 1837; Bristol, UKGBI
- Died: 9 September 1898 (aged 61); Cheddar, Somerset, UKGBI
- Resting place: St Andrew's Church
- Occupations: Hymnwriter; writer
- Spouse: Juliet Dix (m. 1864)
- Children: 7, including Gertrude Dix
- Father: John Dix

William Chatterton Dix (14 June 1837 – 9 September 1898) was a British hymnwriter, writer of devotional works and high-church Anglican. Dix is known for the hymns As with Gladness Men of Old and Alleluia! Sing to Jesus, and the carol What Child Is This?.

== Biography ==
Dix was born on 4 June 1837 in Bristol to John Dix (later John Ross Dix), a surgeon, writer and poet, and Susanna Dix (née Moore; 1808–1888). Born the same year his father published a biography of Thomas Chatterton, Dix was named after the poet. The youngest of three siblings, both of Dix's elder sisters were music teachers.

Initially raised in a Nonconformist household, Dix was later baptised into the Church of England at St Thomas the Martyr on 16 July 1844. In 1850, Dix's father abandoned the family and settled permanently in America. Educated at Bristol Grammar School, Dix also attended a private school in Frome.

== Career ==
Upon leaving school Dix first worked as a clerk in his maternal grandfather's soap and candle manufacturing works in Bedminster. Joining the choir at St Raphael's Church, Dix wrote his first collections of hymns Hymns of Love and Joy around 1859 which was later published in 1861.

His original hymns are found in most modern hymn-books. He wrote also felicitous renderings in metrical form of Richard Frederick Littledale's translations from the Greek in his Offices of the Holy Eastern Church; and of John Medows Rodwell's translations of Abyssinian hymns. Some of his carols, such as The Manger Throne, have been very popular. His hymns and carols also include As with Gladness Men of Old, What Child Is This?, To You, O Lord, Our Hearts We Raise and Alleluia! Sing to Jesus.

At the age of 29 he was struck with a near fatal illness and consequently suffered months confined to his bed. During this time he became severely depressed. Yet it is from this period that many of his hymns date.

== Personal life ==
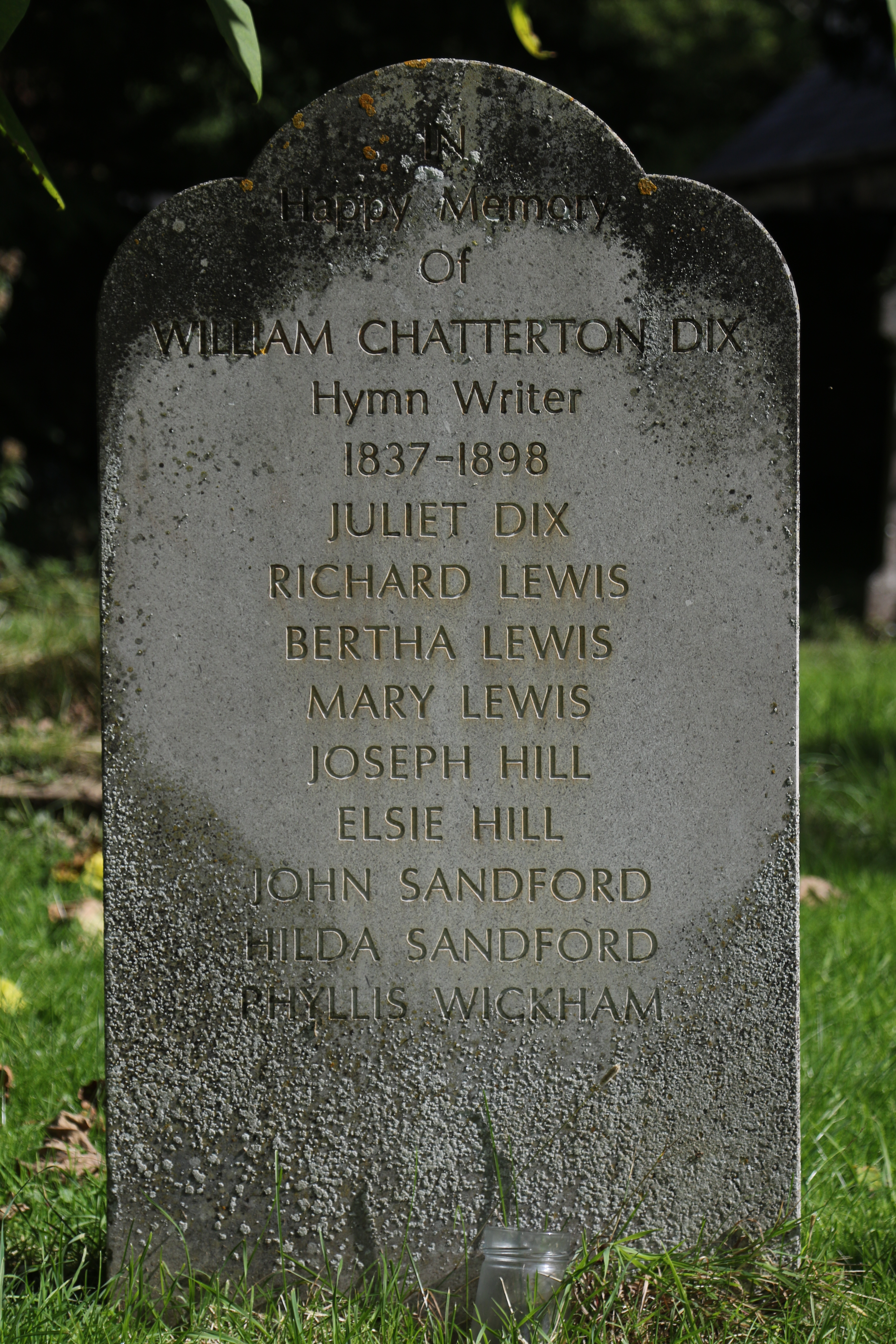
Tomb in the churchyard of St Andrew's Church

On 30 June 1864, Dix married Juliet Dix (née Wartnaby: 1837–1913) in Liverpool. The couple had eight children, including the Gertrude Dix, a writer and socialist, the illustrator Hilda Dix Sandford and Frank Dix, a writer, actor and director.

On 9 September 1898, Dix died in Cheddar, Somerset aged 61. Dix was buried at St Andrew's Church on 12 September 1898.

== Selected works ==
=== Hymns ===
- As with Gladness Men of Old
- Alleluia! Sing to Jesus

=== Carols ===
- What Child Is This?

=== Devotional literature ===
- Light. 1882.
- The Risen Life. 1883.
- The Pattern of Life. 1885.
