= As with Gladness Men of Old =

Hymn based on the visit of the Magi

- Genre: Hymn
- Written: 1859
- Text: William Chatterton Dix
- Based on: Matthew 2:1-12
- Meter: 7.7.7.7.7.7
- Melody: "Dix" by Conrad Kocher

"As with Gladness Men of Old" is an Epiphany hymn, written by William Chatterton Dix on 6 January 1859 (Epiphany) while he was ill in bed. Though considered by many as a Christmas carol, it is found in the Epiphany section of many hymnals and still used by many churches. The music was adapted by William Henry Monk in 1861 from a tune written by Conrad Kocher in 1838. The hymn is based on the visit of the Biblical Magi in the Nativity of Jesus.

== History ==
Dix, as the son of poet John Ross Dix and named after Thomas Chatterton, would regularly write Christian poetry in his spare time. Dix wrote "As with Gladness Men of Old" on 6 January 1859 during a months-long recovery from an extended illness, unable to attend that morning's Epiphany service at church. As he read the Gospel of Matthew's account of Epiphany in The Bible, he was inspired and started to reflect on the text. He then started to write about his thoughts and did so for the whole day with the eventual result being "As with Gladness Men of Old".

Dix kept the text private until a year later when it was published in Hymns for Public Worship and Private Devotion, which was written for St Raphael's Church in Dix's hometown of Bristol. It was also added to the trial version of Hymns Ancient and Modern before being included in the original publication of that hymnal in 1861. Most hymn writers in the Church of England at the time were clergymen, so Dix, a layman and marine insurance agent living in Glasgow, Scotland, was delighted that his carol was included. It was also self-published by Dix in his own Hymns of Joy and Love hymnal.

The editor of Hymns Ancient and Modern, William Henry Monk, adapted a tune by Stuttgart organist Conrad Kocher as the music for "As with Gladness Men of Old". The tune originally consisted of a 7.6.7.6.7.7.6 metre, but Monk removed the fifth phrase to create a more balanced tune. Dix personally did not like the tune, which was ironic as it was later titled "Dix" as a tribute to him. Despite Dix's opinion of it, the tune became popular and is used for the majority of performances of the hymn. The same melody is also used in the hymn "For the Beauty of the Earth", an example of what is often considered to be a seasonal hymn melody given to a more general hymn text for use in Ordinary Time.

== Publication and use ==
After publication, the hymn proved popular in both the Church of England and in other Anglican churches throughout the British Empire. This rise in popularity is attributed to the future Lord Chancellor, Sir Roundell Palmer praising it in his "English Church Hymnody" academic paper published and read at the Church Congress in York in 1866. The lyrics of the hymn would be included in pieces of artwork that would adorn Anglican churches around the world. Though by the 1950s to 1970s, the hymn lost popularity as a Christmas carol, it was still held in high regard as a hymn with a pleasing positive message. The hymn eventually regained popularity as a carol and continued to be published in hymnals as well as in Christmas chapters of them. It has continued to be used in the Church of England. "As with Gladness Men of Old" has also been performed in concerts outside of a church setting.

In 1871, the hymn was first published in the United States in the Episcopal Church of the United States' hymnal. It was later included in The Hymnal 1982 with amended lyrics for the fourth verse. By 1875, the Baptist Church's Triennial Convention in the United States had started publishing "As with Gladness Men of Old" in The Service of Song for Baptist Churches hymnal. When the hymn is used in the United Methodist Church, it can be presented as a church reading for Epiphany as well as in its regular musical setting. The Church of Jesus Christ of Latter-day Saints use the hymn, though set to a piece of music by Dan Carter instead of "Dix". It has also been published in The Harvard University Hymn Book.

== Analysis ==
"As with Gladness Men of Old" used Matthew 2:1–12 as a theme to compare the journey of the Biblical Magi to visit the baby Jesus to each Christian's personal pilgrimage and as a reminder that it is not the value of the gifts, it is the value of giving and adoration to Jesus that is what Christians should seek. It is the only well-known Epiphany hymn or carol about the Biblical Magi that avoids referring to them as either "magi" or "kings" and does not state how many there were.

== Lyrics ==
As with gladness men of old
Did the guiding star behold
As with joy they hailed its light
Leading onward, beaming bright
So, most gracious God, may we
Evermore be led to Thee

As with joyful steps they sped
To that lowly cradle bed
There to bend the knee before
Him whom heaven and earth adore
So may we with willing feet
Ever seek Thy mercy-seat

As they offered gifts most rare
At that cradle rude and bare
So may we with holy joy
Pure, and free from sin's alloy
All our costliest treasures bring
Christ, to Thee, our heavenly King

Holy Jesus, every day
Keep us in the narrow way
And, when earthly things are past
Bring our ransomed souls at last
Where they need no star to guide
Where no clouds Thy glory hide.

In the heavenly country bright
Need they no created light
Thou its light, its joy, its crown
Thou its sun, which goes not down.
There forever may we sing
Hallelujahs to our King

== See also ==
- List of Christmas carols
