= Earl's Mead =

Historic district, estate and thoroughfare in Bristol

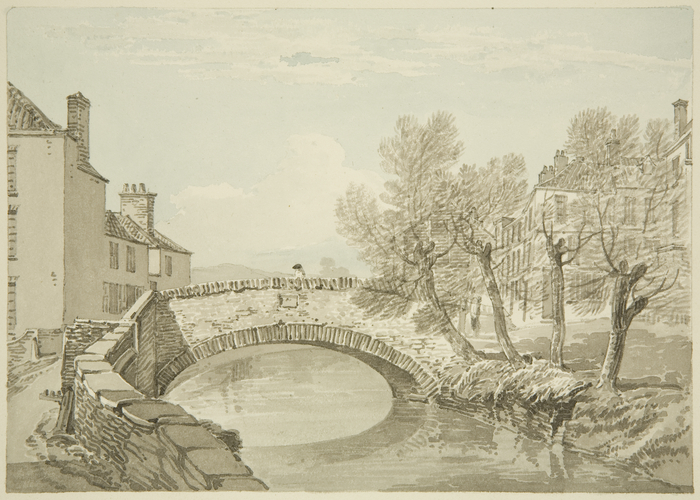
Frome Bridge in Wade Street, 1821, Braikenridge Collection

Earl's Mead (Earlsmead, Earles Mead, Erlesmead or Erlysmede) was a historic district, estate and major thoroughfare in what is now central and east Bristol. The area was noted as an asset of St James Priory in the mid thirteenth century, and the name was in use until the twentieth century. The meadows around the river were a noted location in the city of Bristol's civic calendar by 1682 for annual fishing in the River Froom [sic] and "mighty feasting" by the mayor's party at Earl's Mead, before being gradually developed and redeveloped for light industrial, residential and retail use.

The "principal house" of the district was Earl's Mead House, variously occupied by the Whittingham family, including military leader Sir Samuel Ford Whittingham, and Sarah, wife of Bristol MP Richard Hart Davis and mother of Colchester MP Hart Davis. The Godwin family also occupied the house, including the influential Victorian architect-designer Edward William Godwin.

Earl's Mead was featured in the song of the Antient Society of St. Stephen's Ringers (est. c. 1470) and in letters by John Wesley, founder of Methodism, referencing early Methodists. John Audley, described by Pennsylvania founder William Penn as a "first and most eminent" Quaker, preached in the open fields at Earl's Mead.

In 1480 Earl's Mead ran from the present-day Broadmead shopping district to Baptist Mills. Earl's Mead Street (or Erlys Mede Stret) was the main road into Bristol on the Bristol City Council map depicting Bristol of 1480, running from the present-day Horsefair and then following the line of what is now Newfoundland Road/Way and the lower end of the M32. The housing estates known as Earl's Mead until the twentieth century gradually became known as part of St Paul's and Baptist Mills, later St Jude's, St Werburgh and St Agnes. Part of Earl's Mead is now Riverside Park and the surrounding area where regeneration is planned as part of the Frome Gateway development.

== Geography and extent ==
Earl's Mead comprised wetlands and pasture fields around the lower River Frome. The area was historically prone to flooding and was recorded as flooding on various occasions after the pasture had been turned to housing and is still an area at risk of flooding. The flood of 1889 hit the area especially hard and became a focus of middle-class philanthropists pressing the Bristol Corporation to take action, as well as helping with rectifications and fundraising.

In 1815 the area was surrounded by open countryside, with Earl Street (Earl's Mead) having open views of the Duchess of Beaufort's house, described by local estate agents. A later map depicting William Worcester's 1480 Bristol shows only the western edge of Earl's Mead, around the present-day Cabot Circus car park, Houlton Street, and the western parts of Wellington Road and Clement Street. This map shows a beggar's well to the immediate north-west of the Earl's Mead boundary, corresponding to today's Moxy Hotel.

Millerd's more detailed map of 1673 shows the western extent of Earl's Mead as reaching nearly as far as "The Meeting House", or present-day Quakers Friars. This is described in Bristol City Council open monument data as "between the River Frome and the Castle Mill leat, extending from the Narrow Weir to the Roaring Bridge" (around present-day Wellington Street).

By Rocque's 1742 map the western edge had shifted to present-day Houlton Street, entirely contained between the River Frome to the south and Newfoundland Lane (now Road/Way) to the north. Depictions of the 1610 map of Kingswood place Earl's Mead with a similar western border as Millerd, running east to Baptist Mills and again entirely north of the River Frome.

In 1808 title deeds for Ashley Row (now Lower Ashley Road in St Werburgh) state that the land on which it was built was called Earl's Mead. Later, in 1872, plans to build Byron and Dermot Streets were also cited as Earl's Mead, although these streets are on the west side of Newfoundland Road.

The 1828 Ashmead map describes the area as being in the out-parish of St Paul but shows a substantial Earl's Mead House just south of the River Frome, on Pennywell Lane (now Road). In 1830 plans to build Hill Street and Dale Street (currently the Cabot Circus car park) on land known as both Earles Mead and as Newfoundland in St Paul were recorded.

In 1862 the Bristol Town Clerk reported the findings of a meeting of the town Finance Committee on the planned creation of sewers and roadworks at Earlsmead, the area to then be made available for building purposes. The clerk described Earlsmead as "the piece of ground immediately adjoining St Clement's Church. The church and schools stood on a part of Earlsmead".

By the time of the 1874 Ashmead map the area was mainly residential, with streets including Morton, Elton, Clement, Monk and Albion, along with Newfoundland Road and Newfoundland Gardens. The small number of non-residential buildings included St Clement's Church and school, a hat factory and a school off Newfoundland Road.

By 1894 the remaining open space was developed for the Corporation Depot on Wellington Street, and the remainder of the controversial Newfoundland Gardens was redeveloped for residential St Agnes Road.

Residential Canton Street and Eldon Road were in place by this time; plans for development of these in 1881 described the land as "First Earls Mead". Following redevelopment for housing the district was still called Earl's Mead. In 1882 E. W. Godwin wrote in the Ulster Journal of Archaeology, "the district is still known as 'Earl's Mead', and the principal house in the neighbourhood, which was for some time my residence, is still called 'Earl's Mead House'.".

Bristol City Council established a district-level office on Wellington Street known as the Earlsmead Depot, which at times included the City Housing Department and Surveyor's Office, now a joinery.

=== South of the River Frome ===
Contemporaneous maps indicated that Earl's Mead existed between the Frome and Newfoundland Road. Bristol City Council sources also described the historic Earl's Mead as being crossed by Pennywell Road on the south of the Frome. The Itinerarium of William Worcester describes Earl's Mead as the land bordering the River Frome.

Place names south of the Frome included the Earlsmead Tannery on Eugene Street, Earl's Mead Joinery Works on Pennywell Road, and Earl's Mead House and later Earlsmead Stores on Pennywell Road. Deeds in the first half of the nineteenth century indicate houses on Pennywell Lane, south of the Frome, that were previously known as Earl's Mead. By 1874 Earl's Road at the south of Pennywell Lane had been renamed Earlsmead Terrace.

=== Decline of the Earl's Mead era ===
There is no evidence of the name being used to describe the wider district beyond the 1920s. By this time various buildings and streets carried the name Earl's Mead. The area has been significantly redeveloped since that time.

The only known standing buildings in the Earl's Mead district before the twentieth century are parts of the soon-to-be-redeveloped Wellington Street council depot, which was last recorded as being called Earlsmead Depot in 1990, and the adjoining number 5 Elton Street, which is part of Wogan Coffee.

South of the Frome there are old walls potentially from the former Earlsmead Tannery, later called the J. Scadding timber yard, now vacant for redevelopment. Apart from Eugene Street no buildings from the period remain in the area between the River Frome and Pennywell Road. Byron Street, west of Newfoundland Road at present-day St Werburgh, is still standing, as are a small number of houses on the former Ashley Row (now Lower Ashley Road).

== History ==
The origin of the name Earl's Mead is uncertain but is probably derived from its early owner, the illegitimate son of King Henry I, Robert FitzRoy, 1st Earl of Gloucester, and half-brother of the Holy Roman Empress Matilda. Alternative accounts for the name include Leofwine Godwinson or Sweyn Godwinson, brothers of King Harold.

In Anglo-Saxon times the area later known as Earl's Mead, on the western edge of Kingswood Forest, sat adjacent to the hypothesised pre-Norman settlement and fortification in the district that would become Bristol Castle.

By 1066 this set of riparian wetland pastures was owned by William the Conqueror as part of the royal estate of Barton Regis Hundred. By 1086 half of the hundred had an unnamed Bristol church as a tenant. By the time of the first known mention of Earl's Mead in the mid thirteenth century it was administered as part of St James Priory lands.

Millerd's map records the road known as Erlys Mede Stret as Newfoundland Lane, running along the northern edge of Earl's Mead. The map shows The Whitstry, elsewhere described as Earl's Mead Lodge, bordering the area, and a pest house adjacent along Newfoundland Lane. This was later found to sit a greater distance away.

By 1746 maps showed a ropewalk along the narrow section of Earl's Mead from Narrow Weir to the Frome bridge at Wade Street, then known as Traitor's Bridge for Nathaniel Wade.

Earl's Mead north of the Frome remained part of St James parish until 1798, when it was separated into the new parish of St Paul. In 1828 this area was mainly open fields. There was a public house by the river called Mother Day's on Earl's Mead, opposite Earl's Mead House, according to a letter to the newspaper in 1829 from "a solicitor and brother ringer". The letter recalls a popular song, The Golden Days of Good Queen Bess, connected with the St Stephen's Ringers.

By the turn of the twentieth century Earl's Mead was densely developed mainly for housing, with some light industrial uses at the southern end around Houlton Street and Wellington Road. In the intervening time a field of allotment squats called Newfoundland Gardens caused social concern and was cleared for housing including St Agnes Road.

In the early twentieth century the district name persisted both in describing the area and in the names of a local Earlsmead football team and Earlsmead scout group. By the Second World War the district name Earl's Mead had fallen out of use in favour of St Paul's, with a number of local buildings, streets and businesses retaining the Earlsmead name until as late as 1990. By the 1970s almost the whole area had been cleared for retail, light industrial and Riverside Park in St Jude's.

== Associated buildings and sites ==
- The Whistry. The building, also known as Earl's Mead Lodge and Newfoundland, lay on the south side of Newfoundland Lane. It was constructed in the seventeenth century, and among the owners of the house was the Harris family, Bristol brewers. It was first recorded on Millerd's 1673 map of Bristol. Jean Rocque's survey of the city in 1742 records the building as an L-shaped building, end-on to the lane, which is named as the Pest House. The antiquarian Samuel Seyer, writing in the early nineteenth century, wrote that "within memory" the house had stood separate from the other houses "as usual".
- Earls Mead House, located on the north-western side of Pennywell Road. The building was in existence by 1828 but had apparently been demolished by the early 1880s.
- Earlsmead Tannery, now vacant for redevelopment.
- The Roperies, a ropewalk located in the section of the land parcel known as Earl's Mead which lay between the River Frome and the Castle Mill leat, extending from the Narrow Weir to the Roaring Bridge. The ropewalk was apparently in existence by the seventeenth century and James Millerd's map of c. 1670 calls it "ye Roperie". The ropewalk is not shown on his 1673 map, but the revision of c. 1715 does show "Roperies". Jean Rocque's plan of the city of 1742 shows three rows of trees marked as "The Rope Walk", and it was also recorded in 1751 as "the Rope Yard" during the perambulation of St James parish. The ropewalk is not, however, recorded by the Plumley and Ashmead map of 1828, suggesting that it had gone out of use by that date.
- Latimer reported that a "peste-house" (plague house) had been established "in Earl's Mead" around the time of the 1611 outbreak. This was later found to be north of Earl's Mead corresponding to modern-day St Paul's.
- Bristol City Council Earlsmead Depot, later Wellington Road Depot. Due to be vacated for redevelopment.
- Earlsmead Porter Beer Stores, an off-licence, stood where Earl's Mead House had previously stood.
- Earlsmead Terrace, off Pennywell Road between White Street and the Vestry Hall and burial ground, now redeveloped.
- Earlsmead Stone Yard, Clement Street.

== Legacy ==
Earl's Mead was used locally in the present tense as late as 1990 in the name of the Bristol City Council Earlsmead Depot on Wellington Street. Veronica Smith's Street Names of Bristol (2001) discusses Earl's Mead, BS2. The Antient Society of St. Stephen's Ringers was still operating in 2026. According to Maurice Fells in The Bristol Year: Ancient and Modern Traditions (2003), the society still ceremonially sang The Golden Days of Good Queen Bess. It is unknown whether the lyrics still refer to Mother Day's or Earl's Mead.

In 2006 the BBC ran a public consultation on the search for a name for what would eventually be called Cabot Circus. Earlsmead was one of the public suggestions published on the BBC website.

=== Earls Mead, BS16 ===
A residential street north of Eastville Park, Earls Mead was built after 1949; like the historic district it is adjacent to the River Frome (Bristol) as well as its tributary Fishponds Brook.

The housing estate containing Earls Mead was opposite the former Stapleton Workhouse, which itself replaced the Pennywell Road Workhouse adjacent to the historic Earl's Mead district.

Stapleton Workhouse later became Blackberry Hill Hospital until closure in 2007, with redevelopment for housing starting in 2017 and ongoing in 2024. Pennywell Road Workhouse was replaced by the Vestry Hall, now apartments.

=== Future plans ===
Much of the historic Earl's Mead district is due for regeneration as part of the major Frome Gateway development. Bristol City Council's Frome Gateway Story draws particular attention to the historic Earl's Mead but does not note what role the Earl's Mead name will have in the redeveloped district.
