= Samuel Ford Whittingham =

British army officer

Lieutenant-General Sir Samuel Ford Whittingham KCB KCH
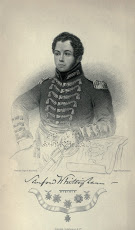
- Born: 29 January 1772; Bristol
- Died: 19 January 1841 (aged 68); Madras Presidency, British India
- Burial place: Fort George
- Military career
- Allegiance: United Kingdom; Spain
- Branch: British Army; Spanish Army; Madras Army
- Service years: 1803–1841
- Rank: Lieutenant-General
- Conflicts: Napoleonic Wars
- Awards: Knight Commander of the Order of the Bath; Knight Commander of the Royal Guelphic Order

Lieutenant-General Sir Samuel Ford Whittingham, KCB, KCH (29 January 1772 – 19 January 1841), whose Christian names were contracted by himself and his friends into "Samford", was a British army officer who served in the Napoleonic Wars. Following the conflict he served in the British Army predominantly in India.

== Biography ==
Whittingham was the elder son and second child of William Whittingham of Bristol. Born in Bristol on 29 January 1772, Samuel Ford was educated at Bristol and was intended for the law. He was determined to become a soldier, but unwilling to oppose his father's wishes during his lifetime, he temporarily entered the mercantile house of his brother-in-law, travelling for it in Spain.

In 1797 he was enrolled at Bristol in the mounted volunteers, a force organised among the wealthier citizens following a threatened French invasion. On his father's death, on 12 September 1801 (aged 60), at Earl's Mead, Bristol, Samford, who was in Spain, became independent, and took steps to enter the army. On his return to England he was gazetted ensign on 20 January 1803. He bought a lieutenancy on 25 February, and was brought into the 1st Life Guards on 10 March the same year. He went to the military college at High Wycombe, and joined his regiment in London towards the end of 1804. Introduced by Thomas Murdoch, an influential merchant, to William Pitt the Younger, the then Prime Minister, as an officer whose knowledge of the Spanish language would be useful, Whittingham was sent by Pitt at the end of 1804 on a secret mission to the Iberian Peninsula, and during absence promoted, on 14 February 1805, to be captain in the 20th Foot. On his return he was complimented by Pitt, and on 13 June 1805 he was transferred to the command of a troop in the 13th Light Dragoons.

On 12 November 1806 Whittingham sailed from Portsmouth as deputy-assistant quartermaster-general of the force, under Brigadier-general Robert Craufurd, intended for Lima; but on arrival at the Cape of Good Hope on 15 March 1807 its destination was changed, and on 13 June it reached Montevideo, recently captured by Sir Samuel Auchmuty. General John Whitelocke had arrived to take command of the combined forces, and as Whittingham's staff appointment ceased on the amalgamation of the forces, Whitelocke made him an extra aide-de-camp to himself. He took part in the disastrous attack on Buenos Aires and in the capitulation on 6 July, and sailed for England on 30 July. He gave evidence before the general court-martial, by which Whitelocke was tried in London in February and March 1808. Owing to his having served on Whitelocke's personal staff, Whittingham's position was a delicate one; but he acquitted himself with discretion.

Whittingham was immediately afterwards appointed deputy-assistant quartermaster-general on the staff of the army in Sicily. On arrival at Gibraltar, however, he acted temporarily as assistant military secretary to Lieutenant-general Sir Hew Dalrymple, the governor, and, hearing of a projected campaign of the Spaniards under Don Xavier Castaños against the French, obtained leave to join Castaños as a volunteer, with instructions to report in detail to Dalrymple on the progress of affairs. This special duty was approved from home on 2 July 1808, and on the 18th of the same month Whittingham was appointed a deputy-assistant quartermaster-general to the force under Sir Arthur Wellesley, but was ordered to remain with Castaños. He took part under La Peña on 18 July 1808 in the victorious battle of Baylen, and for his services was made a colonel of cavalry in the Spanish army on 20 July.

On his recovery from a severe attack of rheumatic fever, Whittingham was sent to Seville on a mission from the Duke of Infantado, and in February 1809 joined the army corps of the Duke of Alburquerque in La Mancha, where he took part in several cavalry affairs with such distinction that he was promoted to be brigadier-general in the Spanish army, to date from 2 March 1809. He was present at the battle of Medellin on 28 March, when the Spanish general Cuesta was defeated by the French general Victor-Perrin. On this occasion Whittingham re-formed the routed cavalry and led them against the enemy. He reported constantly throughout these campaigns to the British minister in Spain, John Hookham Frere, as to the state and operations of the Spanish army.

A short time previous to Wellesley's advance into Spain Whittingham joined the British headquarters on the frontier of Portugal, and became the medium of communication with the Spanish general Cuesta. On 28 July at the battle of Talavera he was severely wounded when gallantly bringing up two Spanish battalions to the attack, and was mentioned in Sir Arthur Wellesley's despatch of 29 July 1809. He went to Seville to recover, and lived with the British minister, Lord Wellesley; employing himself during his convalescence in translating Dundas's Cavalry Movements into Spanish. He was promoted to be major-general in the Spanish army on 12 August.

On the appointment of Castaños to be captain-general of Andalusia, Whittingham became one of his generals of division. At Isla-de-Leon, whither he went by Sir Arthur Wellesley's direction to see General Venegas about the defence of Cadiz, he was given the command of the Spanish cavalry, which he remodelled upon British lines.

Whittingham served in command of a force of Spanish cavalry and infantry under La Peña at the battle of Barrosa, on 5 March 1811, and kept in check a French corps of cavalry and infantry which attempted to turn the Barossa heights by the seaward side. In June he went to Palma, Majorca, with the title of inspector-general of division, and, in spite of the opposition and intrigues of Don Gregorio Cuesta, captain-general of the Balearic Islands, raised a cavalry corps two thousand strong, and established in February 1812 a college in Palma for the training of officers and cadets of his division.

On 24 July 1812 the Majorca division embarked for the eastern coast of Spain to co-operate with the troops under Lord William Bentinck from Sicily. In October Whittingham's corps (increased to seven thousand) was employed on outpost duty with its headquarters at Muchamiel, three miles from Alicante. In March 1813 Whittingham was appointed inspector-general of both the cavalry and infantry troops of his division. He was engaged on the 7th of the month in the affair of Xegona, and on the 15th in the affair of Concentayña was wounded by a musket-ball in the right cheek, and was on both occasions most favourably mentioned by Sir John Murray in despatches. On 13 April he took part in the victorious battle of Castalla, and was again mentioned in despatches. When Murray invested Tarragona on 3 June Whittingham's division occupied the left. On Suchet's advance to relieve the place Whittingham vainly suggested to Murray that a corps of observation should be left before Tarragona, and that Murray should move to meet Suchet with all his force. The siege was raised. Murray was relieved in command of the army by Lord William Bentinck, and Whittingham covered the retreat, checking and repulsing the French column in pursuit, and joining the main army again at Cambrils. In July he was given the command of the cavalry of the II and III army corps in addition to his own division.

In March 1814 Whittingham escorted King Ferdinand VII in his progress to Madrid, and was presented with a mosaic snuffbox by the king, who on 16 June 1814 promoted him to be lieutenant-general in the Spanish army. On 4 June Wellington wrote from Madrid to the Duke of York, in anticipation of Whittingham's return home: "He has served most zealously and gallantly from the commencement of the war in the peninsula, and I have had every reason to be satisfied with his conduct in every situation in which he has been placed". Whittingham was promoted to be colonel in the British army and appointed aide-de-camp to the prince regent from the date of Wellington's letter.

In January and February 1815 Whittingham gave evidence in London before the general court-martial for the trial of Sir John Murray. On 3 May he was made a companion of the order of the Bath, and also knighted. On Napoleon's escape from Elba Whittingham returned to Spain, at the special request of King Ferdinand, who conferred upon him the grand cross of the order of San Fernando. He was employed as a lieutenant-general in the Spanish army under General Castaños. When the war was over he resided at Madrid, enjoying the favour of the court, and using for good such influence as he possessed with the king. In July 1819 he took leave of the Spanish court, upon accepting the Lieutenant-governorship of Dominica. Sir Henry Wellesley wrote at this time to Lord Castlereagh, expressing the sense he entertained of Whittingham's services both during the war and after, and reporting that he left Spain with the testimony of all ranks in his favour, "but without any other reward from the government for the valuable services rendered by him to the Spanish cause than that of being allowed to retain his rank in the Spanish army". His private means had been reduced by losses, and he was at this time a poor man with an increasing family. He arrived at Dominica on 28 March 1820. On his departure to take up the appointment, dated 5 October 1821, of quartermaster-general of the king's troops in India, the inhabitants presented him with the grand cross of San Fernando set in diamonds, while the non-resident proprietors of estates in the island gave him a sword of honour. On his arrival in England he was made a knight commander of the Hanoverian Guelphic Order.

Whittingham reached Calcutta on 2 November 1822. He was busy in 1824 with the preparations for the expedition to Ava, and in November of that year with the Barrackpur Mutiny. On 27 May 1825 he was promoted to be major-general, retaining his appointment as quartermaster-general until a command became vacant. He took part in the siege of Bhartpur, was slightly wounded on 13 January 1826, but was present at the capture on the 18th. He was made a knight commander of the order of the Bath, military division, on 26 December, for his services at Bhartpur, and received the thanks of the House of Commons. In February 1827 he was appointed to command the Cawnpore Division. On 1 November 1830 he was transferred to the Mirat Command, on exchange with Sir Jasper Nicholl. His tenure of command came to an end in August 1833, and he then acted temporarily as military secretary to his old commander, Lord William Bentinck, the governor-general, with whom he returned to England in 1835.

On arrival in England in July he was near fighting a duel with Sir William Napier, on account of the slur which he considered that Napier had cast on the Spanish troops in his History of the War in the Peninsula, but the matter was arranged by Sir Rufane Donkin. In October 1836 Whittingham was appointed to the command of the forces in the Windward and Leeward Islands of the West Indies. He sailed for Barbados on 22 December, with the local, exchanged in a few months for the substantive, rank of lieutenant-general. In September 1839 he was given the command of the Madras Army; he arrived at Madras on 1 August 1840, and died there suddenly on 19 January 1841. He was buried with military honours at Fort George on the following day, salutes being fired at the principal military stations of the presidency. A tablet to his memory was placed in the garrison church, Madras.

== Works ==
Whittingham published:

- (1811) Primera Parte de la Táctica de la Caballeria Inglesa traducida, 8vo
- (1815) A System of Manœuvres in Two Lines
- A System of Cavalry Manœuvres in Line, London and Madrid, 8vo.

He was the author of several unpublished papers on military and political subjects, which in 1900 were in possession of the family. A list of them is given in the Memoir of Whittingham's Services (1868), which has as frontispiece a portrait engraved by H. Adlard from an original miniature.

== Family ==
Whittingham married at Gibraltar, in January 1810, Donna Magdalena, elder of twin daughters of Don Pedro de Creus y Ximenes, intendant of the Spanish royal armies, by whom he had a large family, and several of his sons were in the army. After his death she remarried to Prince Paul of Württemberg.

== Notes ==
Military offices
Preceded by Sir Jasper Nicolls	C-in-C, Madras Army; 1839–1841	Succeeded by The Marquess of Tweeddale
