= John Ross Dix =

British surgeon, writer and poet (1811–1865)

- Born: John Dix; 21 September 1811; Bristol, UKGBI
- Died: 8 November 1865 (aged 54); Brooklyn, New York City, US
- Other name: John Ross
- Occupations: Surgeon; writer; poet
- Notable work: The Life of Thomas Chatterton (1837)
- Spouse: Susannah Dix (m. 1832; sep. 1850)
- Children: 3, including: William Chatterton Dix
- Relatives: Gertrude Dix (granddaughter)

John Dix, later known as John Ross Dix, (21 September 1811 – 8 November 1865) was a British surgeon, writer and poet active in Great Britain and America.

== Early life and family ==
Dix was born John Dix on 21 September 1811 in Redcliffe, Bristol to John Dix, a lead merchant, and Elizabeth Dix (née Ross), whom Dix claimed was taught by Mary Newton the sister of Thomas Chatterton. The fourth of six known siblings, Dix was a Scottish descent.

On 22 March 1832, Dix married Susannah Dix (née Moore; 1808–1888), with whom he had three children. The couple's son, the hymnwriter William Chatterton Dix, was named after Thomas Chatterton.

== Career ==
Dix began writing poetry for the Bristol Mirror, which was later published in the 1829 anthology Lays of Home. Alongside his wife Susannah, Dix started a business in Wellington in Somerset, but this soon failed.

In 1837, Dix published The Life of Thomas Chatterton. The book contained not only a biography but many of Chatterton's poems. This book contained some of Chatterton's unpublished early work but it was said to be full of half truths and even had a now discredited portrait.

Dix quickly took classes to study medicine at the expense of his friends and obtained work as a surgeon in Monmouth just over the border in Wales. His need for alcohol meant that his medical business failed and he took again to writing poems in 1837 that were combined with engravings by Edward Villiers Rippingille to create Progress of Intemperance.

Dix served time in Cardiff Gaol for debt despite applying to the Royal Literary Fund. His claims of employment around this time included editor of the Monmouth Beacon, esquire, bodyguard and traveller.

In 1845 his biography of Chatterton was published in Boston, Massachusetts after he had worked his passage as ship's surgeon. By 1847 he was back again in London asking for money from the Royal Literary Fund and despite taking a pledge of temperance he was ill and alcoholic. Dix's writings included fantasies of his friendship with Hannah More and Robert Southey and also longer descriptions of major poets like William Wordsworth. Actually one of Dix's poems, Church Wreck had once "ill advisedly" been compared to Wordsworth.

By 1850 Dix was back in America writing books on temperance, but having abandoned his family in England and having taken the name John Ross Dix. Dix was writing also on religious subjects. In 1860 he published The New Apostles, an attack on the Catholic Apostolic Church. Based on this book, he had a theological dispute with Edward Eddis, member of the Catholic Apostolic Church. In 1864 he published at least a dozen ballads that supported the Unionist cause in the Civil War.

== Personal life ==
Dix was the grandfather of Gertrude Dix, a writer and socialist, the illustrator Hilda Dix Sandford and Frank Dix, a writer, actor and director.

On 8 November 1865, Dix died in Brooklyn, New York City aged 54.
