= Riverside Park, Bristol =

Park in Bristol, England

Riverside Park
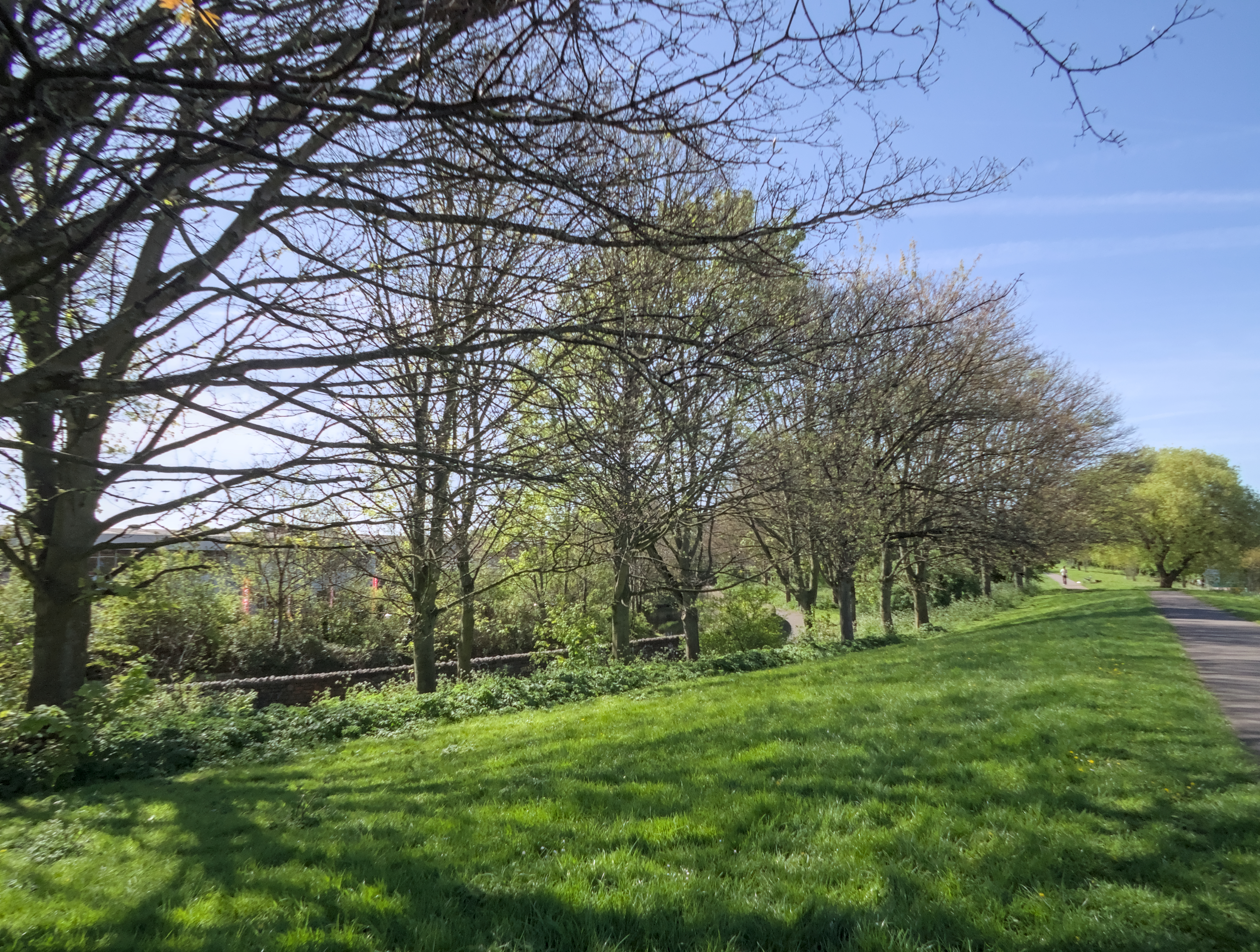
- Interactive map of Riverside Park
- Type: Public park
- Location: St Jude's, Bristol, England
- Coordinates: 51.463386°N 2.577345°W
- Area: 10.9 acres (4.4 ha)
- Created: 1975
- Operated by: Bristol City Council
- Status: Open

Riverside Park is a park located in the St Jude's area of Bristol, England. Bounded by the M32 motorway (formerly Newfoundland Way) to the west and the River Frome to the south and east, the park was established in the mid-1970s as part of a wider redevelopment of Easton and St Paul's.

The site has served as a location for youth facilities, including the St Paul's Adventure Playground and the Riverside Youth Project. In the 2020s, the park became a focal point of the Frome Gateway Regeneration Framework. It is part of the Frome Valley Walkway.

== History ==
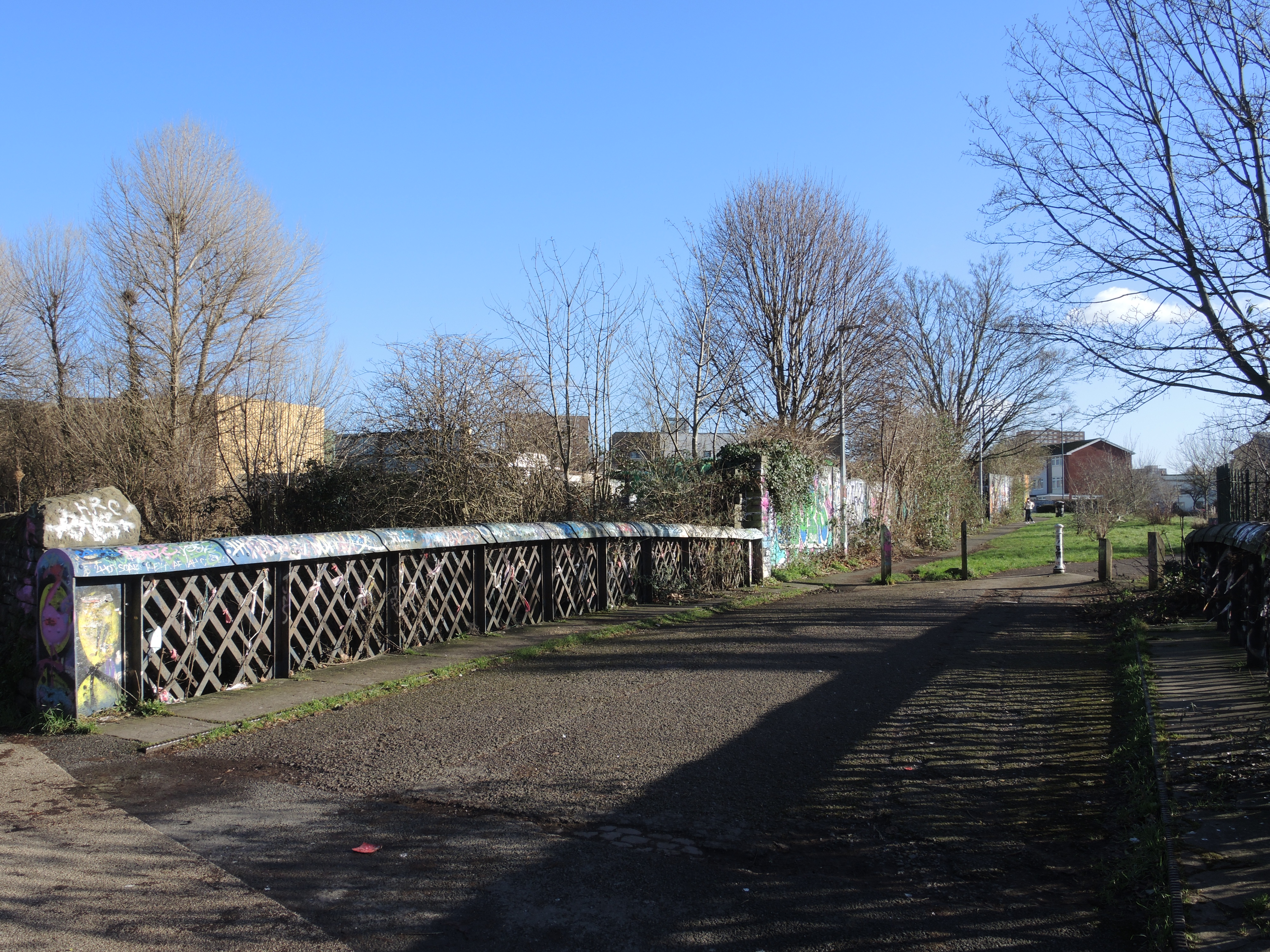
The Peel Street bridge still spans the River Frome despite closure of the road to motor vehicles. It was constructed by the Bristol Sanitary Authority in 1884–1885.

Proposals to create a riverside park were submitted to Bristol city planners in 1974. The project required the clearance of approximately 12.6 acres (5.1 ha) of land situated between Newfoundland Road and the River Frome, entirely subsuming Monk Street, St Agnes Road, Cowley Road, and Howes Road. While the total clearance area was large, approximately 1.7 acres (0.69 ha) were later reserved for future development of the Outer Circuit Road, resulting in a final area of 10.9 acres (4.4 ha). The plans approved in 1975 included provisions for artificial landscaping and areas for sports.

During the early construction period in 1975, complaints were recorded regarding broken pavements, bent lamp-posts, and earthworks. City planners proceeded to implement permanent road closures, specifically blocking Peel Street and Wellington Road, to prevent motorists from using the residential streets as rat runs to the main road, arguing that traffic reduction was essential for safety in the park.

=== St Paul's Adventure Playground ===
From approximately 1980 to 1991, Riverside Park was the home of the St Paul's Adventure Playground. The playground had been relocated from Ashfield Place following the construction of a new primary school. The new facility became a hub for local youth. By 1988, the site was one of only four adventure playgrounds in Bristol managed by local committees.

In 1991, the playground was forced to close to allow Wessex Water to construct a sewer pipeline through the park. As part of the arrangement, the company donated £170,000 toward the playground's relocation. A new £400,000 facility was subsequently opened at Thomas Street, adjacent to St Agnes Church, in 1994.

=== Riverside Youth Project ===
The park has also hosted the Riverside Youth Project (formerly the Broad Plain Boys' Club). In 1984, the Federation of Boys Clubs received a Sports Council grant of £200,000 to develop a sports centre at Riverside Park.

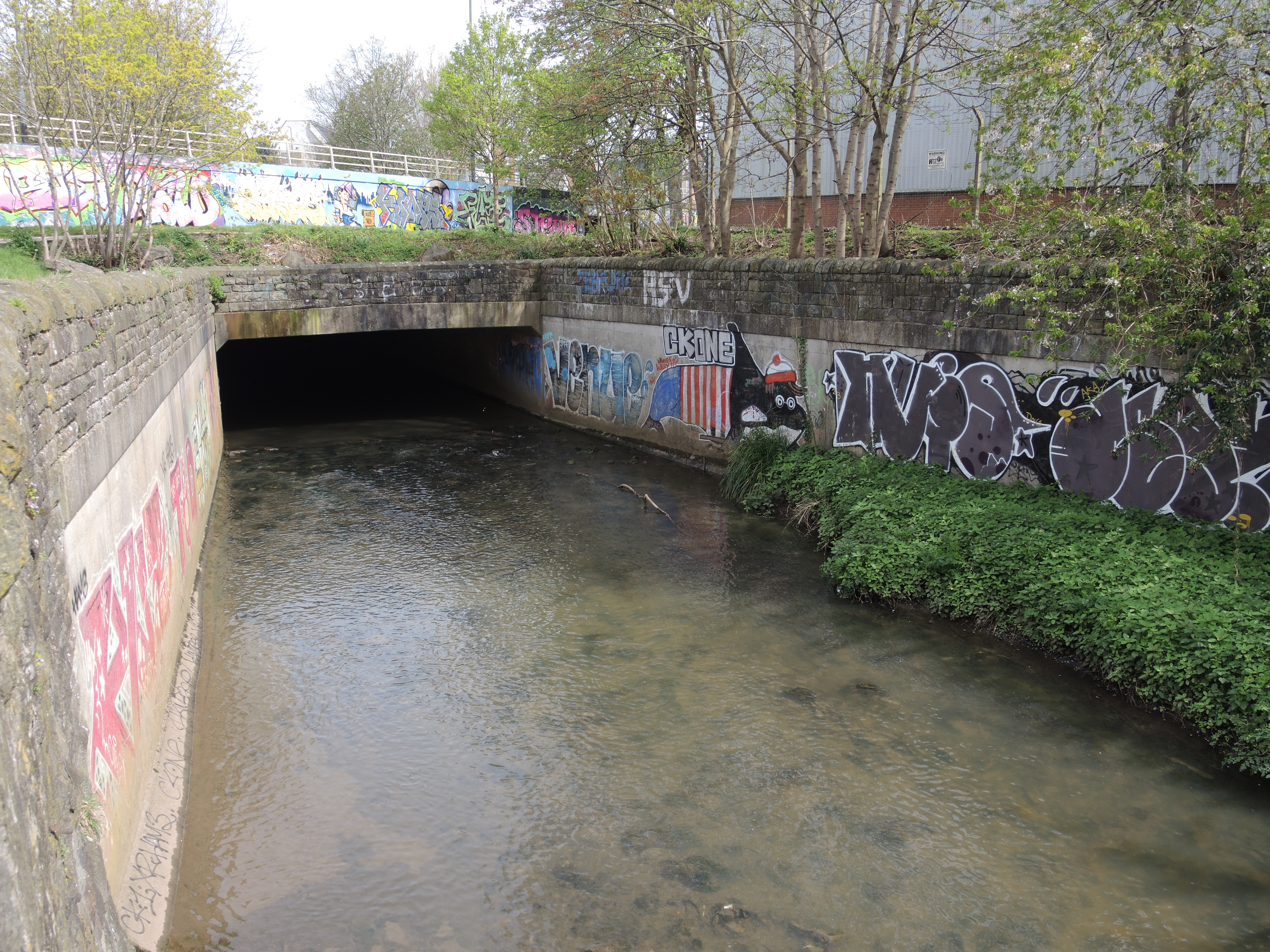
The River Frome emerges from a culvert below Junction 3 of the M32, before retreating through a similar culvert downstream on the west end of Wellingtom Road

== Geography and hydrology ==
The park is situated in an urbanised and industrial area. It is bordered by the M32 motorway to the west, which separates St Jude's from the St Paul's area. The River Frome runs along the southern edge of the park. In this section of the city, the river is semi-culverted; it disappears entirely underground beneath the Cabot Circus parking garage shortly after passing the park.

== Frome Gateway Regeneration Framework ==
In the 2020s, Riverside Park was incorporated into the Frome Gateway Regeneration Framework, a planning initiative by Bristol City Council and the West of England Combined Authority. It proposes the transformation of the industrial land surrounding the river into a mixed-use neighborhood, with a goal of constructing approximately 1,000 new homes by 2035.

The regeneration plan places emphasis on Riverside Park as an asset capable of addressing ecological concerns. A 2025 proposal outlined a flood resilience scheme for the park, including the construction of an amphitheater and improved lighting. The framework also aims to restore the River Frome to a wildlife corridor by naturalising sections of the riverbank.

The River Frome Reconnected Partnership has identified the redevelopment as an opportunity to enhance the nature conservation value of the park. During public consultations, the Bristol Civic Society expressed its support for the design of the flood resilience measures. The Bristol Walking Alliance (BWA) criticised the design, claiming it would create a risk of collision between pedestrians and cyclists due to the path's use as a cycle route as part of Concorde Way.

== See also ==
- Parks of Bristol
