= Helena Born =

British–American anarchist, labor activist, and feminist

- Born: 1860; Devon, England
- Died: 1901 (aged 40–41)
- Occupations: Activist, typesetter

Helena Born (1860–1901) was a labor and feminist activist. After leaving a life of privilege, she and her friend Miriam Daniell became labor union organizers in the late 1880s. They emigrated to the United States in 1890, where they joined the Boston anarchists and Born attempted to live a life of feminist and anarchist principles.

== Life ==
Helena Born was born and raised near Black Torrington in Devon by an affluent family. Born and her family moved to Bristol when she was 15. She attended a girls' academy and her family restricted her from learning a trade or advancing to university study. Her family supplied Born with an income such that she did not need to work, but Born additionally chose not to participate in the gentry. Born collected labor and women's rights newspaper articles in her youth and later joined the feminist organization Bristol Women's Liberal Association in her twenties. Born and her friend, Miriam Daniell, joined the British socialist movement and moved into a Bristol working class neighborhood. Born became the secretary of the Bristol Gas Workers and General Laborers Union. Born supported their 1889 strike with fundraising, picketing, and speeches. She attempted to organize local seamstresses unsuccessfully. In 1890, she and Daniell emigrated to the United States.

Born changed her focus in America. Whereas she was politically active in Britain, she did not participate in American politics, and instead focused on living a principled, feminist life. She found that these principles overlapped with that of the Boston anarchists, which provided a theoretical basis for her goals. In seeking to live a life of feminist practice, she forwent her family's passive income and took up typesetting. Born believed that her most useful political activism was her personal commitment to noncooperation with repressive social institutions. To further extricate herself from these norms, she and Daniell built a house on a California commune, where they hoped to stay indefinitely. The house, however, was soon destroyed, and Daniell died in 1894. Born traveled back to Boston, where she opened a restaurant with her lover William Bailie. Though Bailie was married, they did not hide their relationship. Born died of uterine or cervical cancer in 1901.

== Bibliography ==
- Gay, Kathlyn; Gay, Martin (1999). "Born, Helena (1860–1901)". Encyclopedia of Political Anarchy. ABC-CLIO. pp. 34–35. ISBN 978-0-87436-982-3.
- Marsh, Margaret S. (1981). Anarchist Women, 1870–1920. Philadelphia: Temple University Press. ISBN 978-0-87722-202-6. OCLC 708544972.
