= James Millerd =

Bristol cloth merchant and cartographer (1637 to 1715)

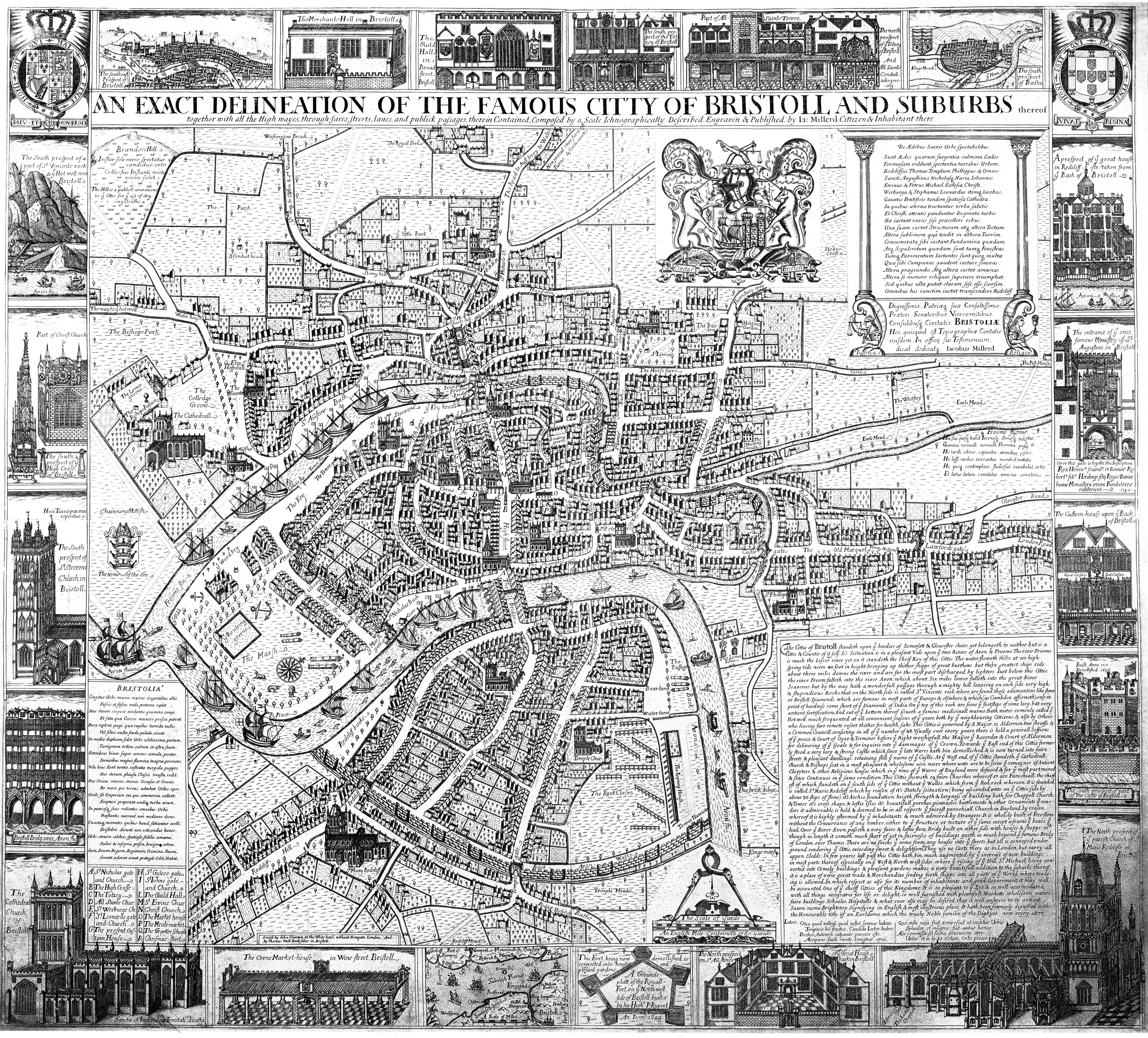
- Millerd's 1673 map of Bristol
- Born: c. 1637; Chewton Mendip, Somerset
- Died: 1715
- Occupations: Bristol cloth merchant and cartographer
- Known for: His 1673 map of Bristol and related prospect of the city
- Spouse: Rachel (nee) Lewis

James Millerd (Millard) (c. 1637–1715) was a Bristol cloth merchant and cartographer, best known for his 1673 map of the city and his associated illustrations of Bristol.

== Life ==
Relatively little is known about James Millerd. The only published discussion of his life is by John E. Pritchard, who was responsible for locating and recovering the only known copy of Millerd's 1673 map.

James 'Millard', son of William Millard, a 'husbandman' (tenant farmer) from Chewton Mendip, Somerset, was apprenticed on 5 June 1651 to the Bristol mercer (cloth dealer) George Atwood. Apprentices typically began their training around the age of 14, with the apprenticeship lasting at least 7 years. On this basis, it seems likely that Millerd was born c. 1637. 'Millard' became a freeman of Bristol, as a mercer, on 29 August 1659. This would not have been possible until he had completed his apprenticeship. As a freeman, Millerd would have been able to set up a business, vote in elections, hold public offices and recruit his own apprentices. One of his later apprentices would be George Atwood, son of his former (deceased) master, who was indentured to Millerd and his wife, Rachel, on 11 February 1676.

A 1662 Hearth Tax return records that James Millard was living in a house with 3 hearths on the east side of Bristol Bridge, in the parish of St. Thomas. On 7 February 1663 he married Rachel Lewis of St Nicholas parish, whose family were linendrapers (dealers in linen cloth). In August 1663 and October 1664, James Millerd, mercer of St Thomas, acted as a bondsman in support of two marriage licences in Bristol.

On 29 June 1669, Millerd and his wife Rachel took on an apprentice, John Saunders, son of a gentleman from Keynsham. By 1670 Millerd was living in a house in St Thomas ward with 5 hearths. The following year he was elected Master of the small Mercers and Linen Drapers Company of Bristol.

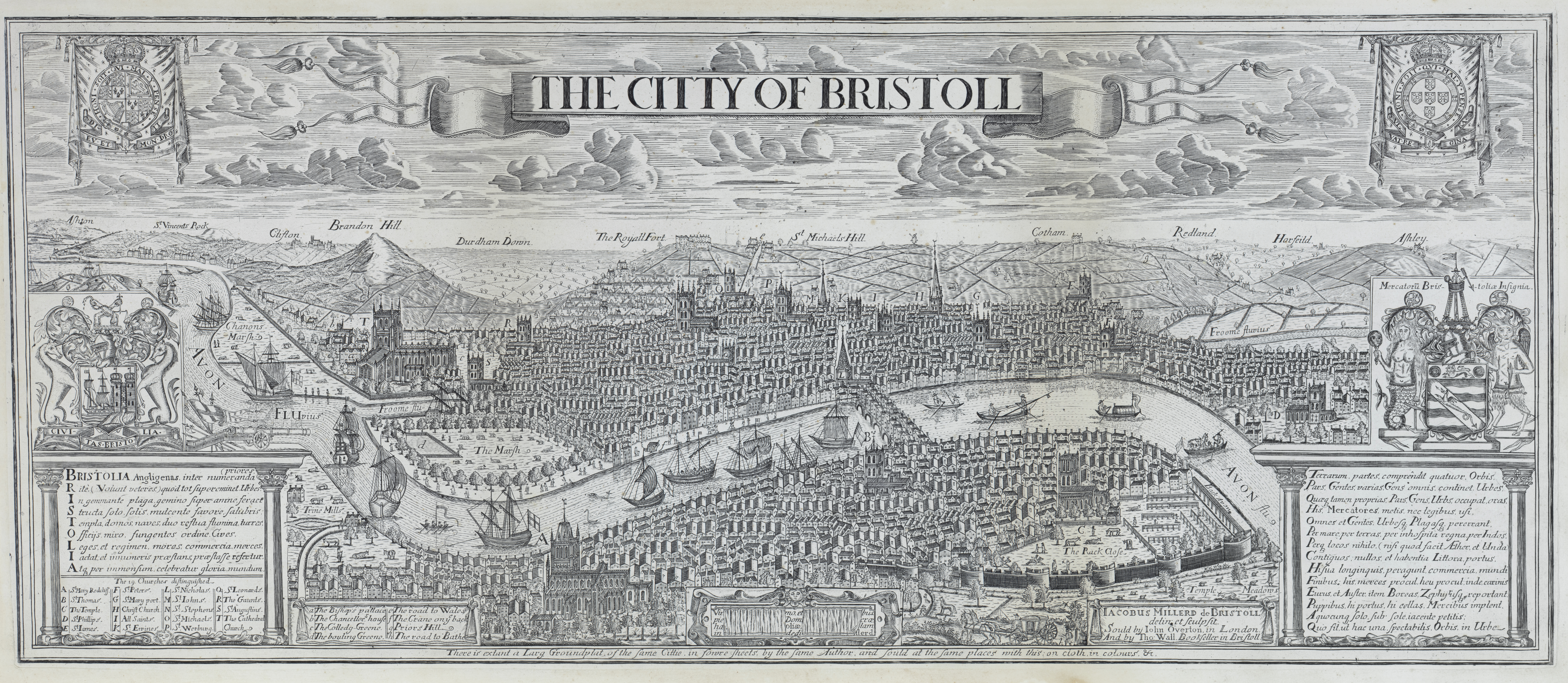
James Millerd, prospect of The Citty of Bristoll (1673)

In 1671 Millerd created a map of Bristol—9 inches x 10 inches (23 cm x 25 cm). This was the most detailed and accurate map of the city produced to date. It sold so well that Millerd was persuaded to create a much larger map, printed over 4 sheets. The large map was presented to the Corporation in 1673, which voted him a reward of £10 in silver plate, which took the form of a tankard. On 10 November, the Society of Merchant Venturers made a similar gift, to the value of £5, on receipt of their copy. Following this, Millerd produced a 'prospect' (city view) of the city, as seen from the south east—12 inches x 28 inches (30 cm x 71 cm). This time there was no official recognition or reward, which presumably explains Millerd's decision to engrave closed curtains over the dedication at the bottom. For a draper to draw drapes over his dedication seems to have been a double visual pun. This was his last known cartographic or illustrative work. However, he did later undertake a further minor revision to his plate, incorporating the arms of the Earls of Bristol below the title. This presumably predated the 1677 death of George Digby, 2nd Earl of Bristol, since the arms of the third earl, John Digby, are not depicted.

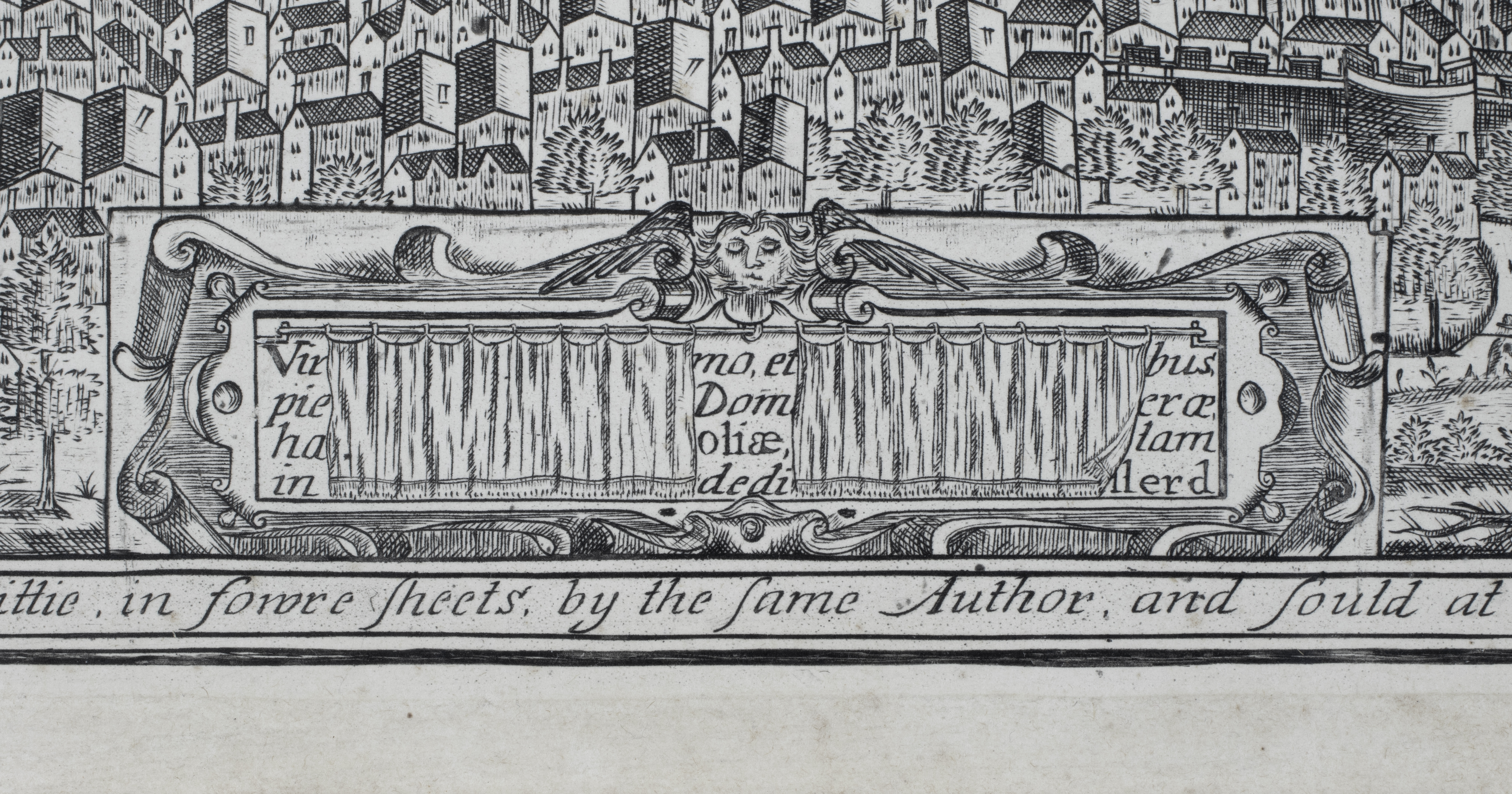
Dedication on the Millerd's 1673 prospect, obscured by drapes

On 29 October 1677, James 'Millard', mercer, acted as patron to his former apprentice, John Saunders, to be made a freeman of Bristol. On 19 June 1682 he took on another apprentice, James Hasell, the son of a deceased Bristol merchant, William Hasell. Having completed his apprenticeship under Millerd, Hasell was made free of the city on 14 December 1691. On 10 May 1688, Millerd (described as a merchant) and his wife Rachel apprenticed John Pinford, of Stinchcombe. Whether he completed his apprenticeship is unknown, but he appears not to have gained his freedom in Bristol. On 3 April 1694, James 'Miller' (sic), mercer, and his wife Rachel apprenticed Matthew Rogers, the son of a deceased Bristol merchant, also called Matthew. He was made free of the city as a mercer on 24 March 1702, under Millerd's patronage. These apprenticeship records and burgess rolls suggest that Millerd remained active as a cloth merchant in Bristol throughout the late seventeenth century, rarely taking on more than one apprentice at a time.

On 30 January 1679, James Millerd of St Thomas parish was one of 25 men who signed a certificate in support of their minister, the Rev Richard Thompson, who had been accused of being a supporter of the supposed Popish Plot. They testified to the orthodoxy of Thompson's sermons, practices and teaching as a loyal Anglican.

In 1696, James Millerd and his wife, Rachel, and daughter, also called Rachel, were living in a house on Bristol Bridge. They had two servants, his apprentice Matthew Rogers, and a female servant called Mary Parker. Millerd paid only the standard tax, which suggests that he was not wealthy.

James Millerd was elected as one of the Guardians for the Corporation of the Poor of Bristol on 19 May 1696, representing the Ward of St Thomas. At its first Court he was selected to 'consider of a seal' for the new body, which suggests that he had maintained his reputation as a draughtsman. On 23 December 1697 he was appointed to a committee of 21 guardians who were to decide on punishments for those who misbehaved while in the New Workhouse. The records of the Corporation of the Poor suggest that Millerd served as a Guardian for 4 years, but that he also held the post of Coroner in the city.

On 22 November 1698, James Millerd stood as a candidate to become Chamberlain of Bristol, which would have made him responsible for the city's administrative functions. However, he lost to another Councillor. On 18 March 1702 James Millerd was appointed as one of the two Coroners in the city, serving in the post till his death in 1715.

== Cartography ==
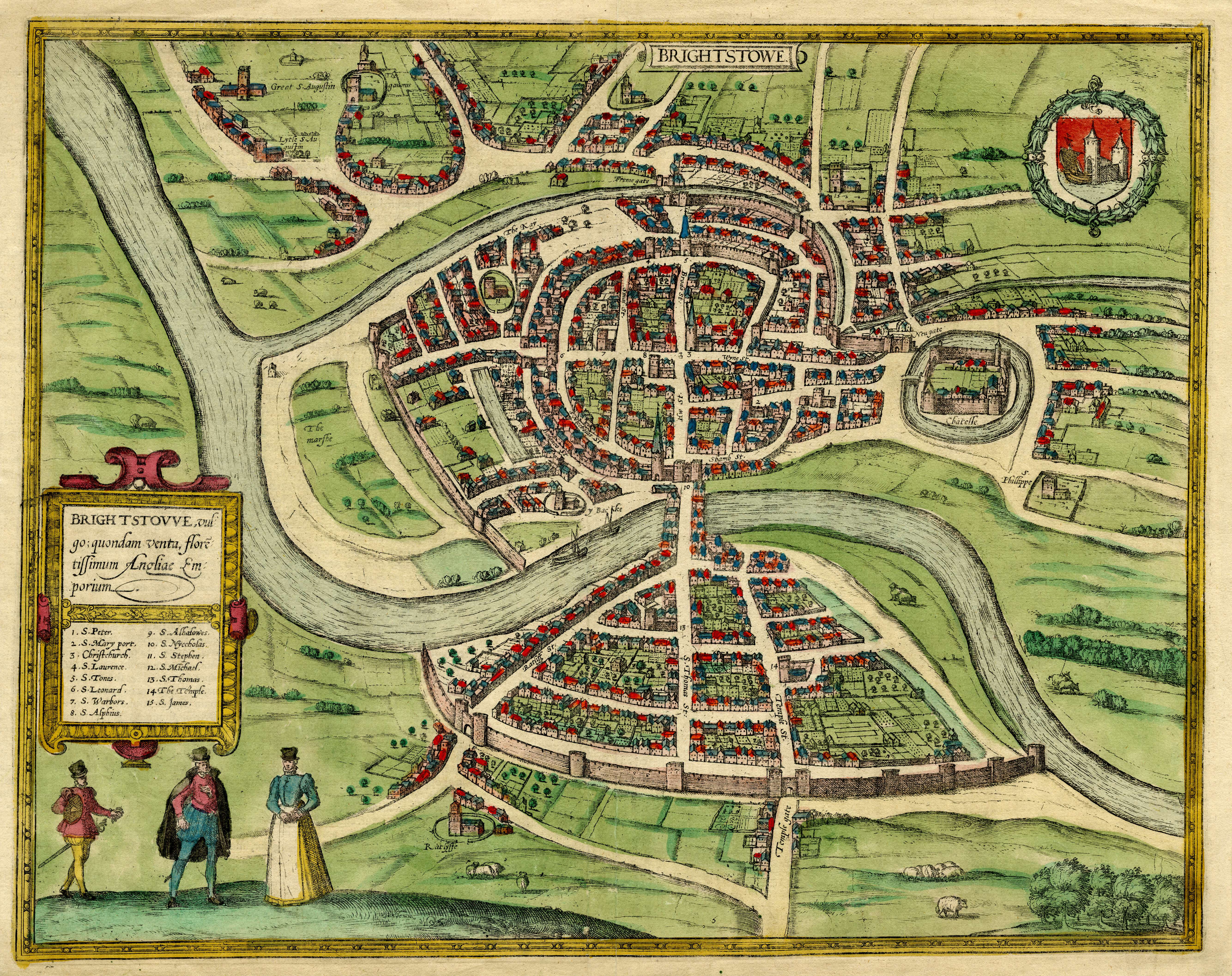
Braun and Hogenberg's map of c. 1574 was previously the most detailed map of the city.

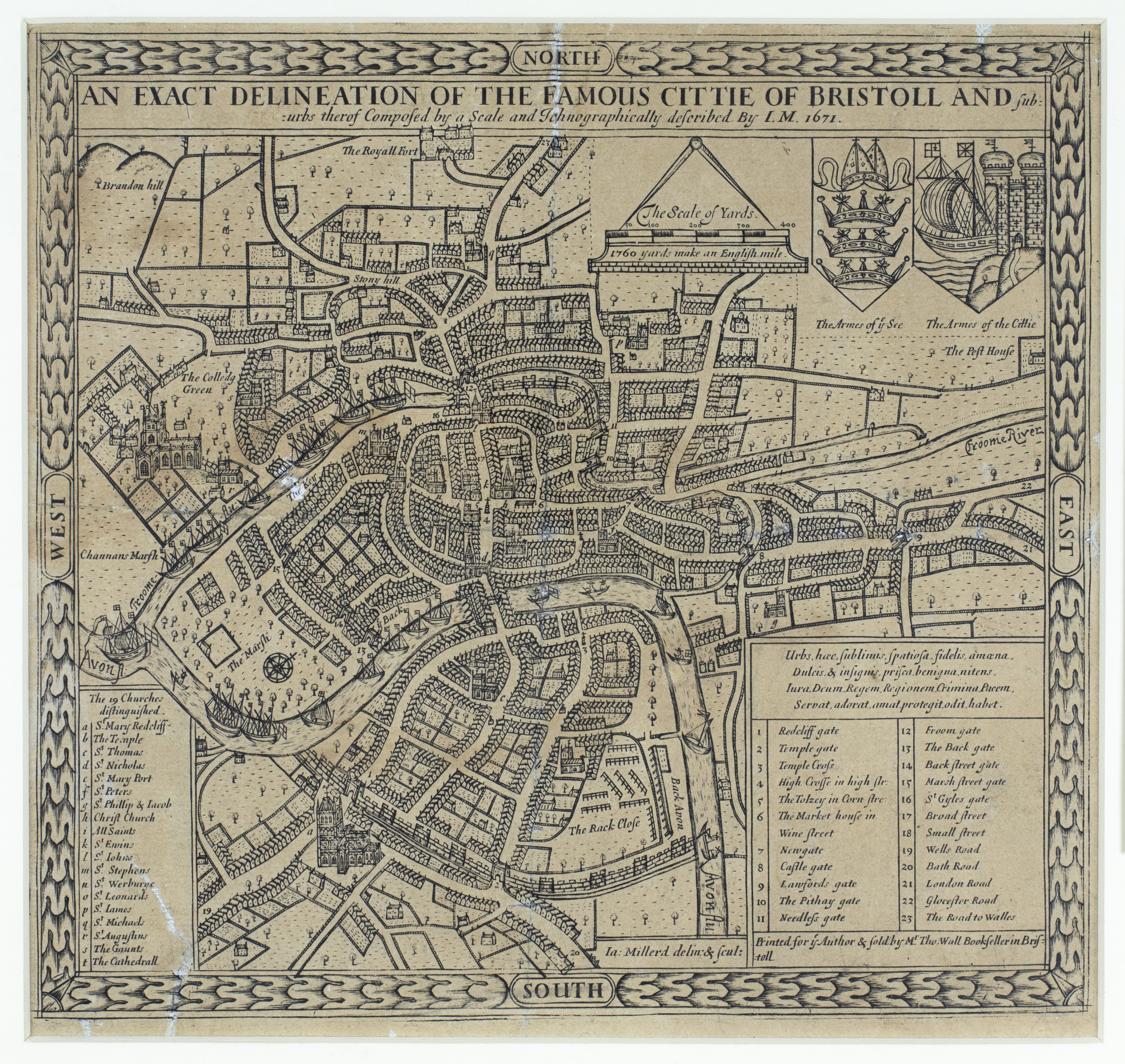
Millerd's plan of 1671

In 1671 Millerd produced a map of the city, entitled An Exact delineation of the famous cittie of Bristoll and suburbs thereof composed by a scale and ichnographically described in a plate of 9 inches x 10 inches (23 x 25 cm). This was a properly surveyed map and much more detailed than Braun and Hogenberg's c. 1574 map, which was previously the most detailed map.

Encouraged by the reception and sales of his 1671 map, Millerd went on to produce the 1673 map, for which he is best known. On its presentation to the City Corporation, to whom it was dedicated, the Council House rewarded him 'for his present of a map of the citty, being the largest, exactest, and handsomest that was ever yet drawn of this citty.' The map incorporated a number of short Latin jokes, or humorous comments that relate to different parts of Bristol.

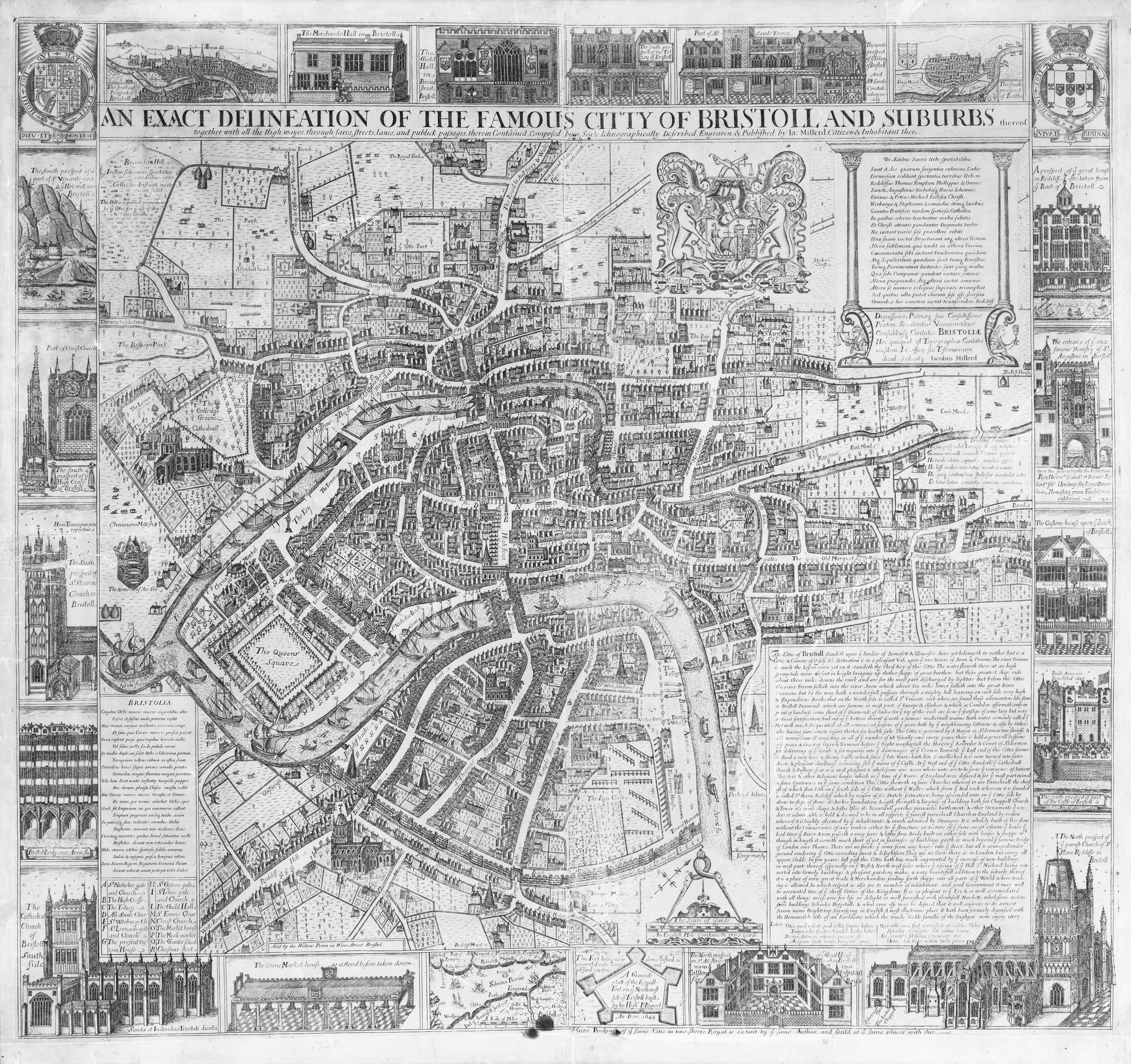
1728 edition of 'Millerd's' map, incorporating new features, such as the recently developed Queen Square.

At least three more editions of the 1673 map were published, which included updates to reflect Bristol's growth and development. The surviving later editions date to 1684, 1696 and 1728. The last edition was produced posthumously and incorporates numerous changes to the city that occurred in the early 18th century, including the development of Queen Square. This map was digitised by the Bristol Record Society in 2020, with the general map and many details from it then being made available as high-resolution jpg files on Wikimedia (see 'Gallery', below).

Millerd's map was only superseded in terms of accuracy and detail when John Rocque produced a new 'Plan of the City of Bristol' in 1742–3.

Millerd's 1673 map and its border illustrations have been widely used and reproduced by historians since the 19th century. His map serves as a key reference point for Professor Roger Leech's reconstruction of the medieval and early modern city.

While copies of the original 1673 map were long unknown, in the early 20th century one was relocated and acquired by the city. This is now on display in Bristol Museum & Art Gallery, which also sells facsimile copies of Millerd's 1671 map, the 1673 map, and the prospect. Following the acquisition of the 1673 copy, Thomas Chubb, Keeper of Maps at the British Museum, said of it:

This must, I think, be one of the most valuable documents you have in your public archives. So far as I know there is no plan of any other town in the Country, at that period, on the same scale and with similar interesting and valuable pictures in the margin. I consider it of the greatest value, and everything possible should be done for its preservation in order that it may be handed down to posterity in its present good condition.

== Galleries of Millerd's topographic works ==
Millerd's 1671 plan in sections (high resolution)

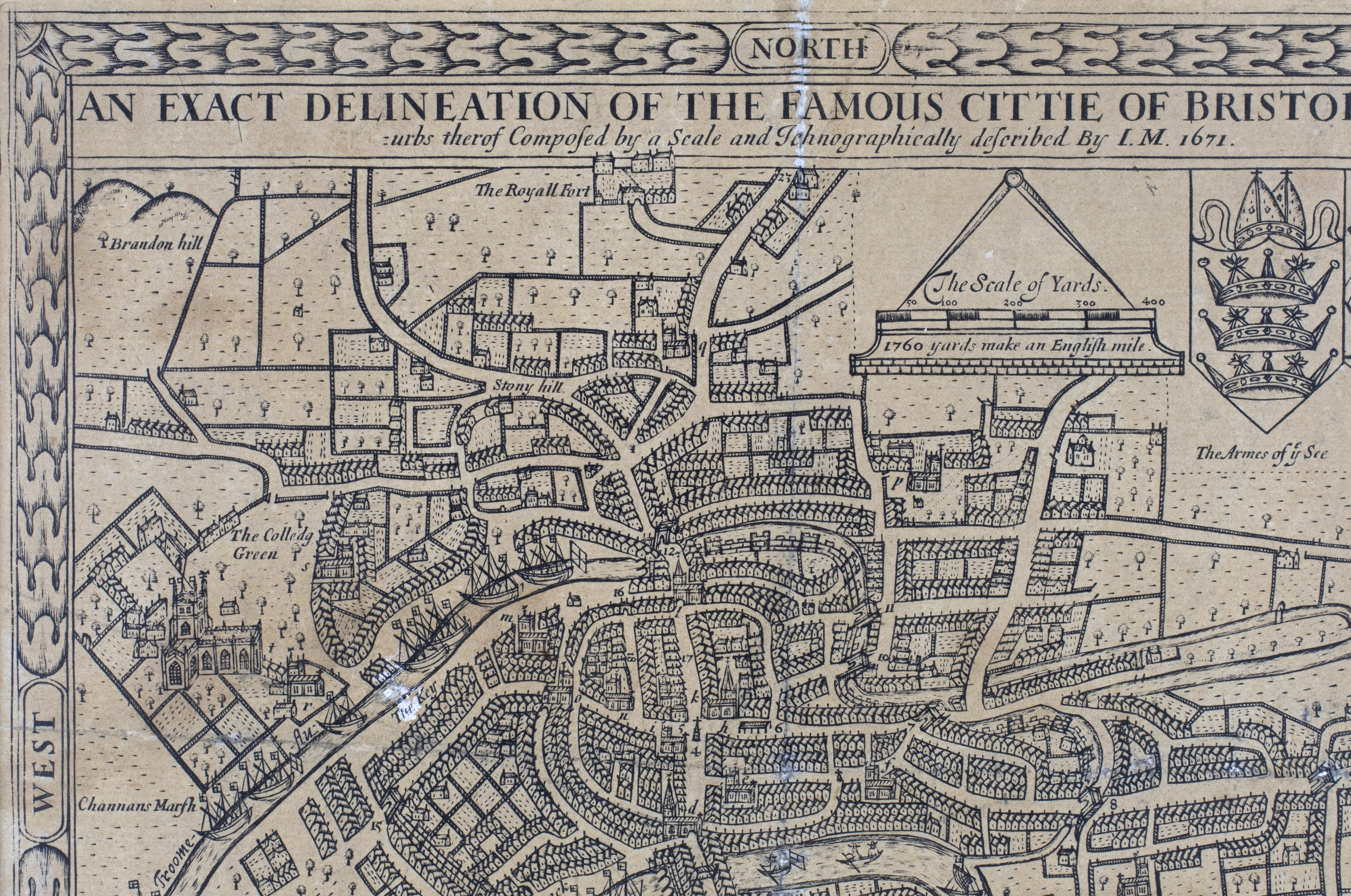
Northwest

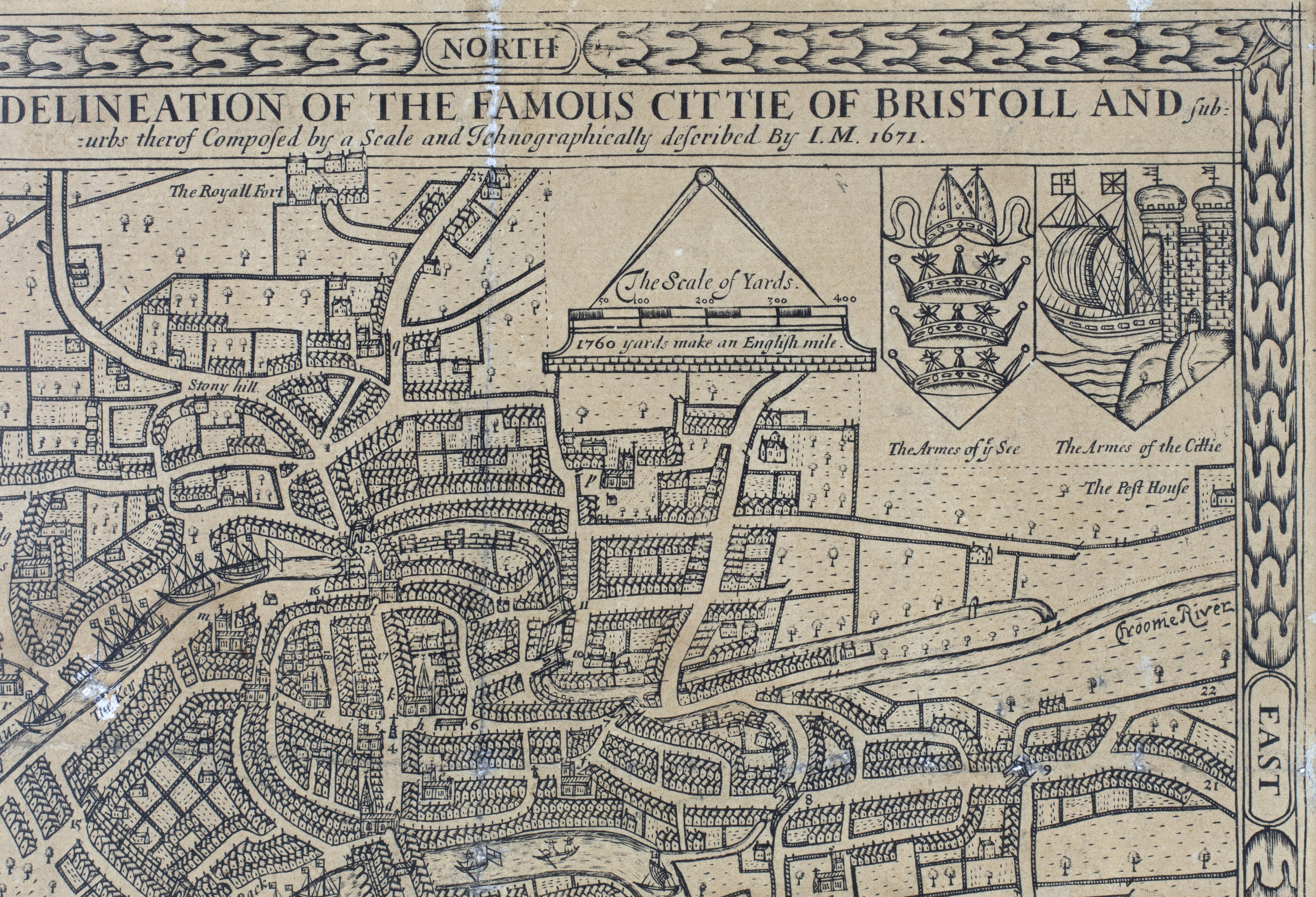
Northeast

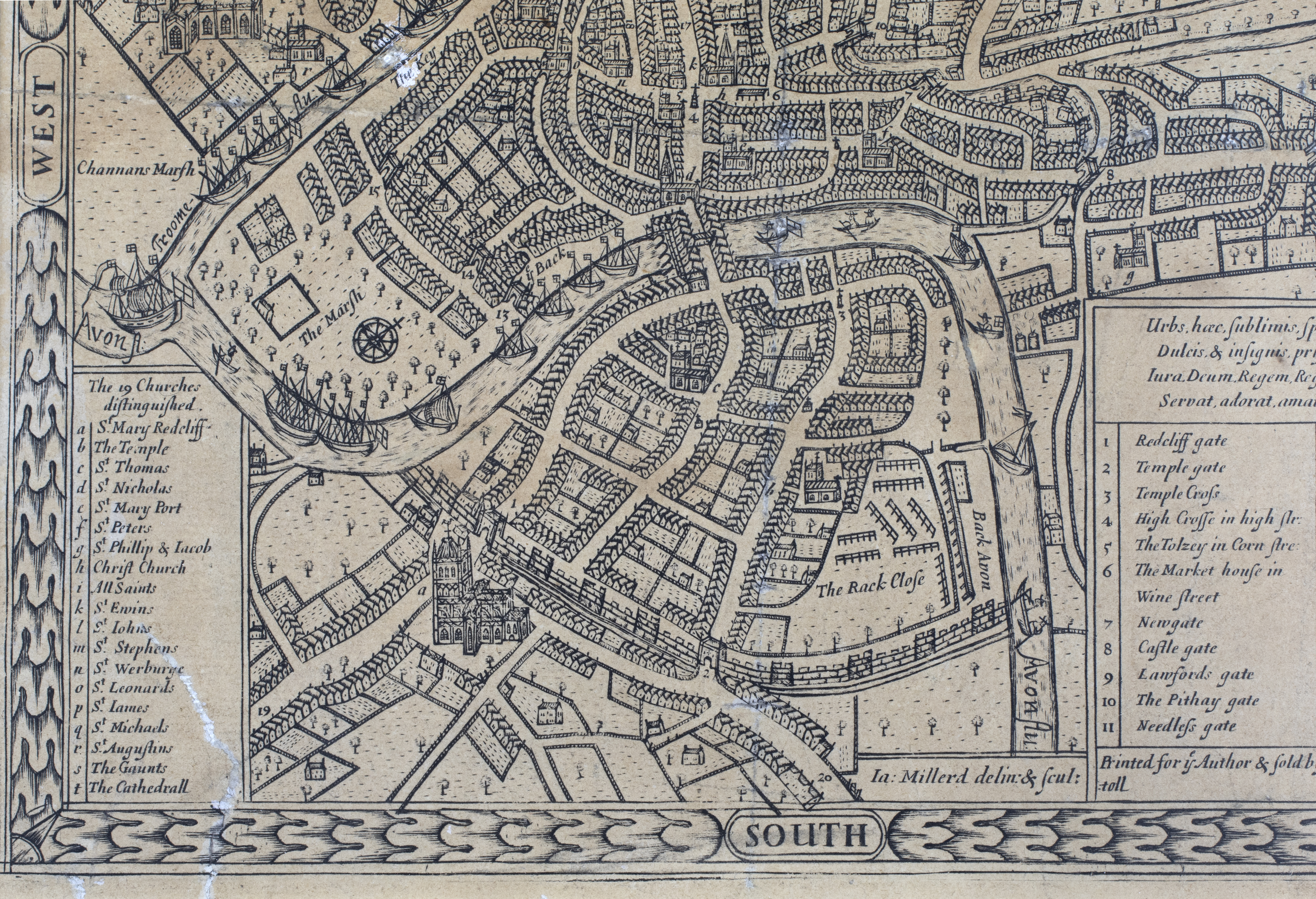
Southwest

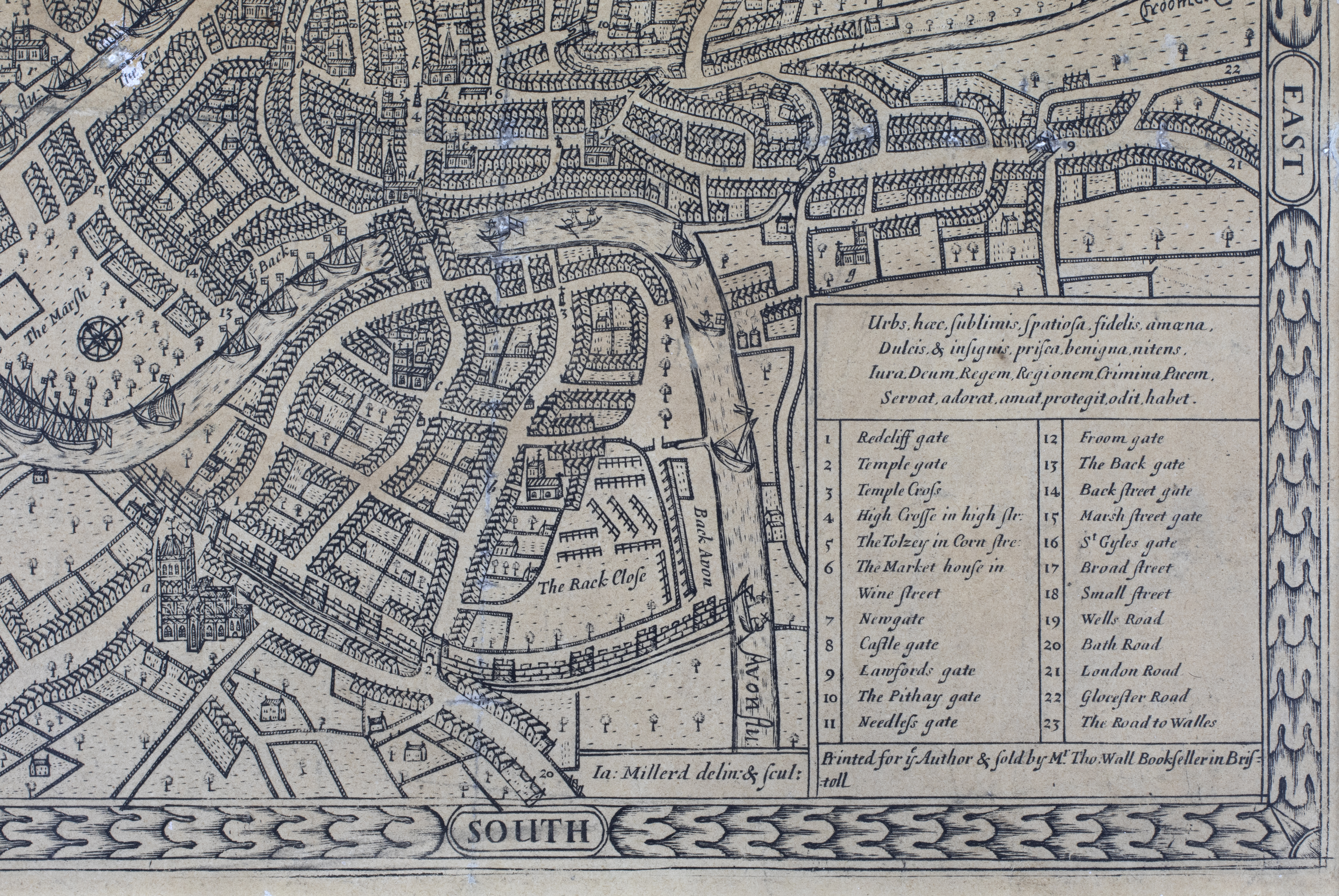
Southeast
Marginal images from Millerd's map of Bristol

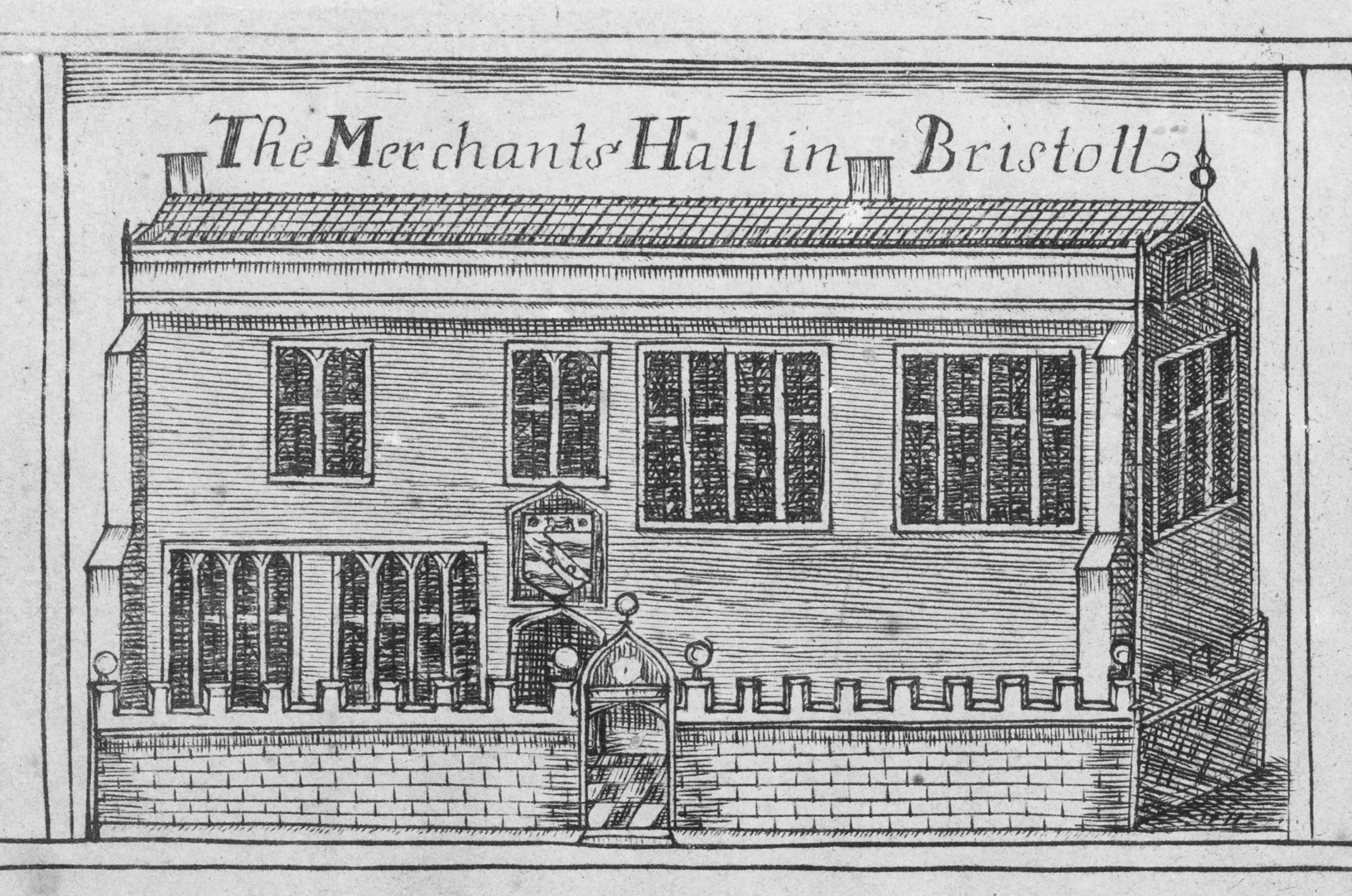
Merchant's Hall

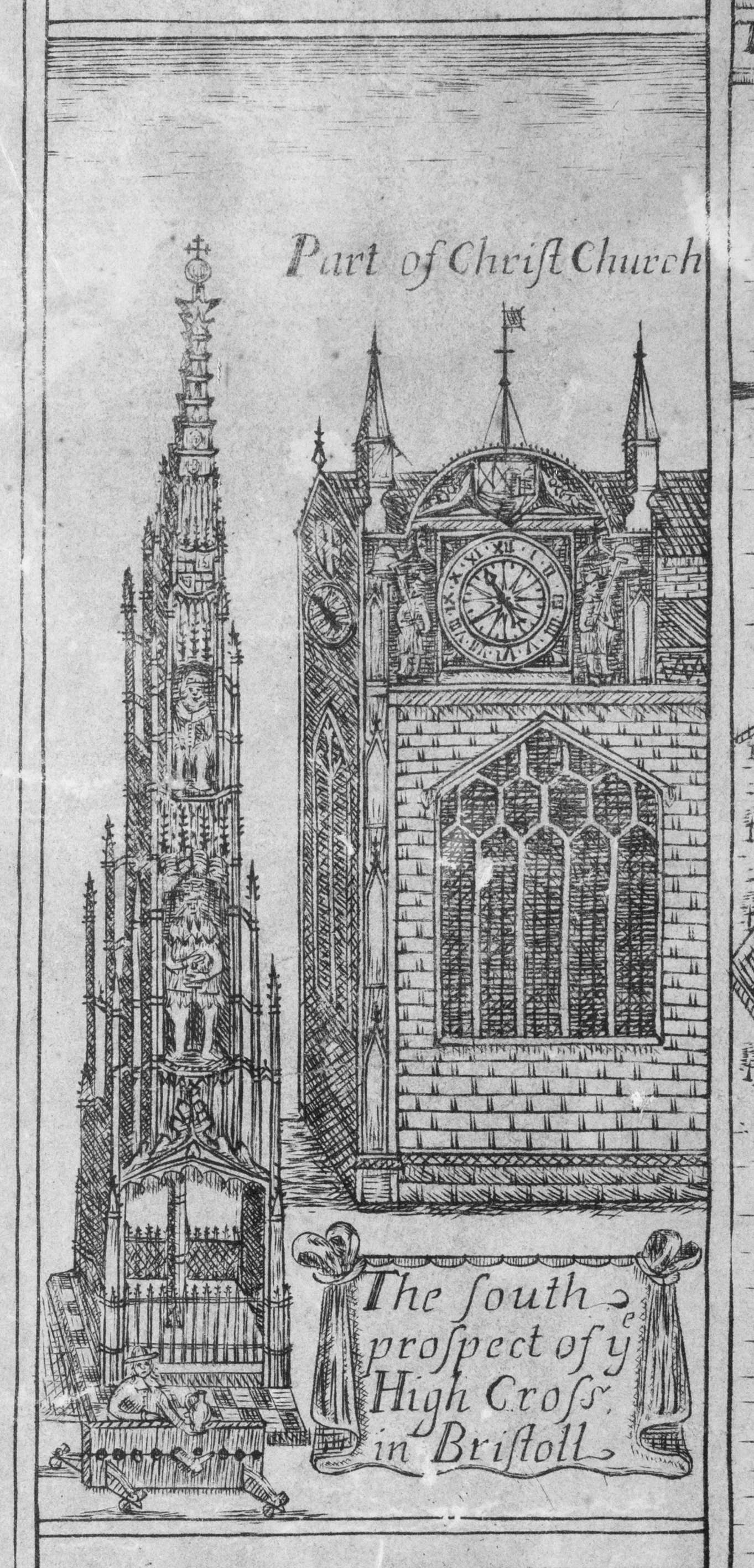
High Cross

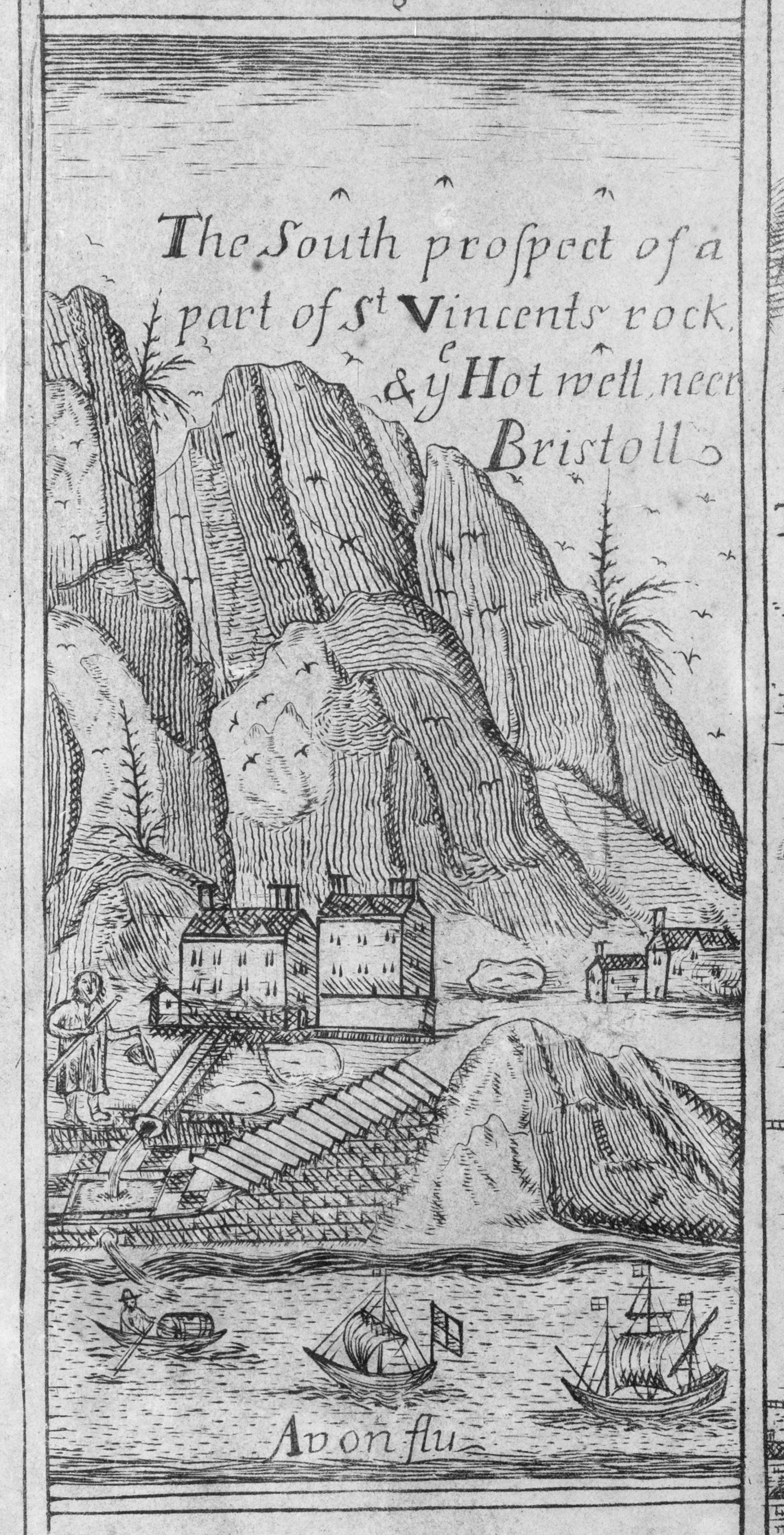
Hotwells

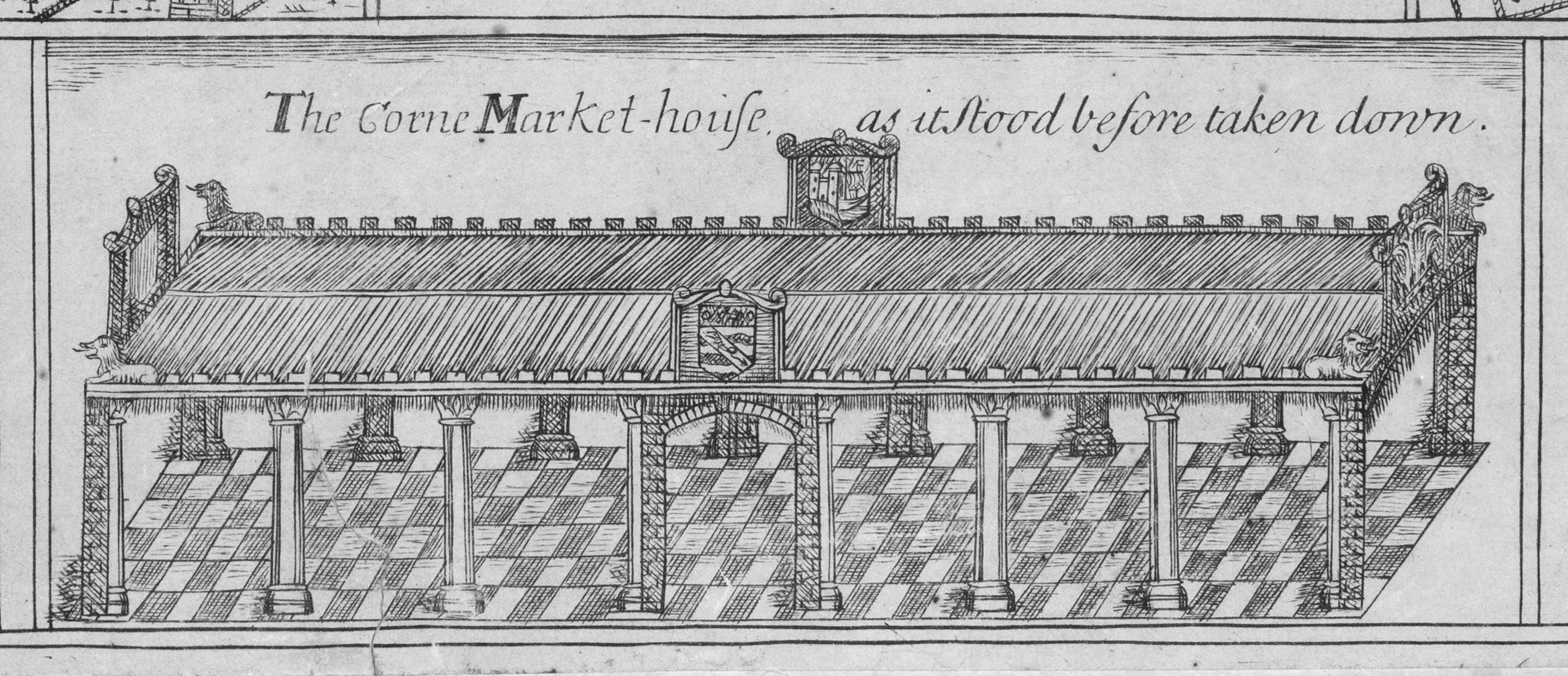
Corn Market

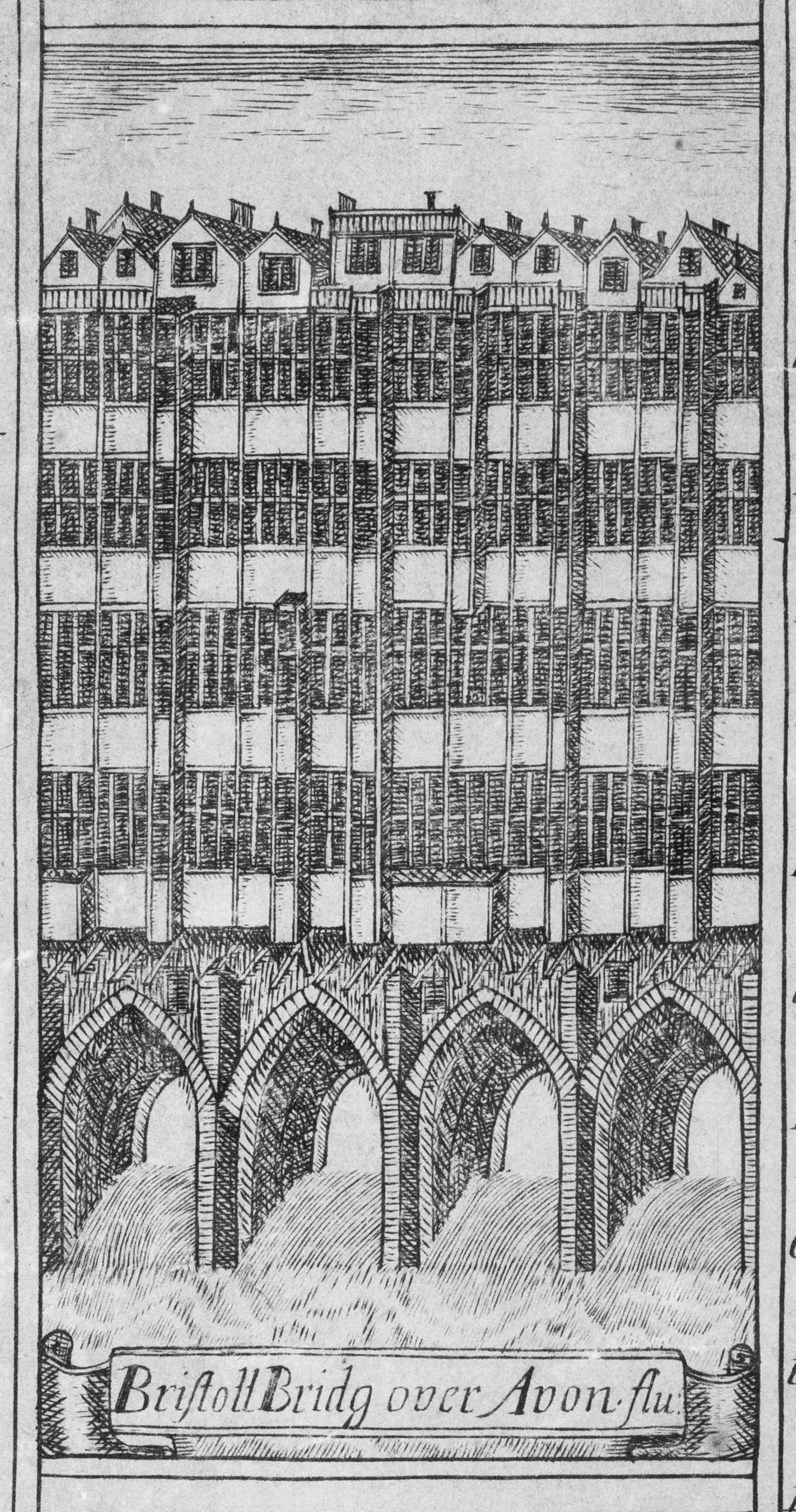
Bristol Bridge

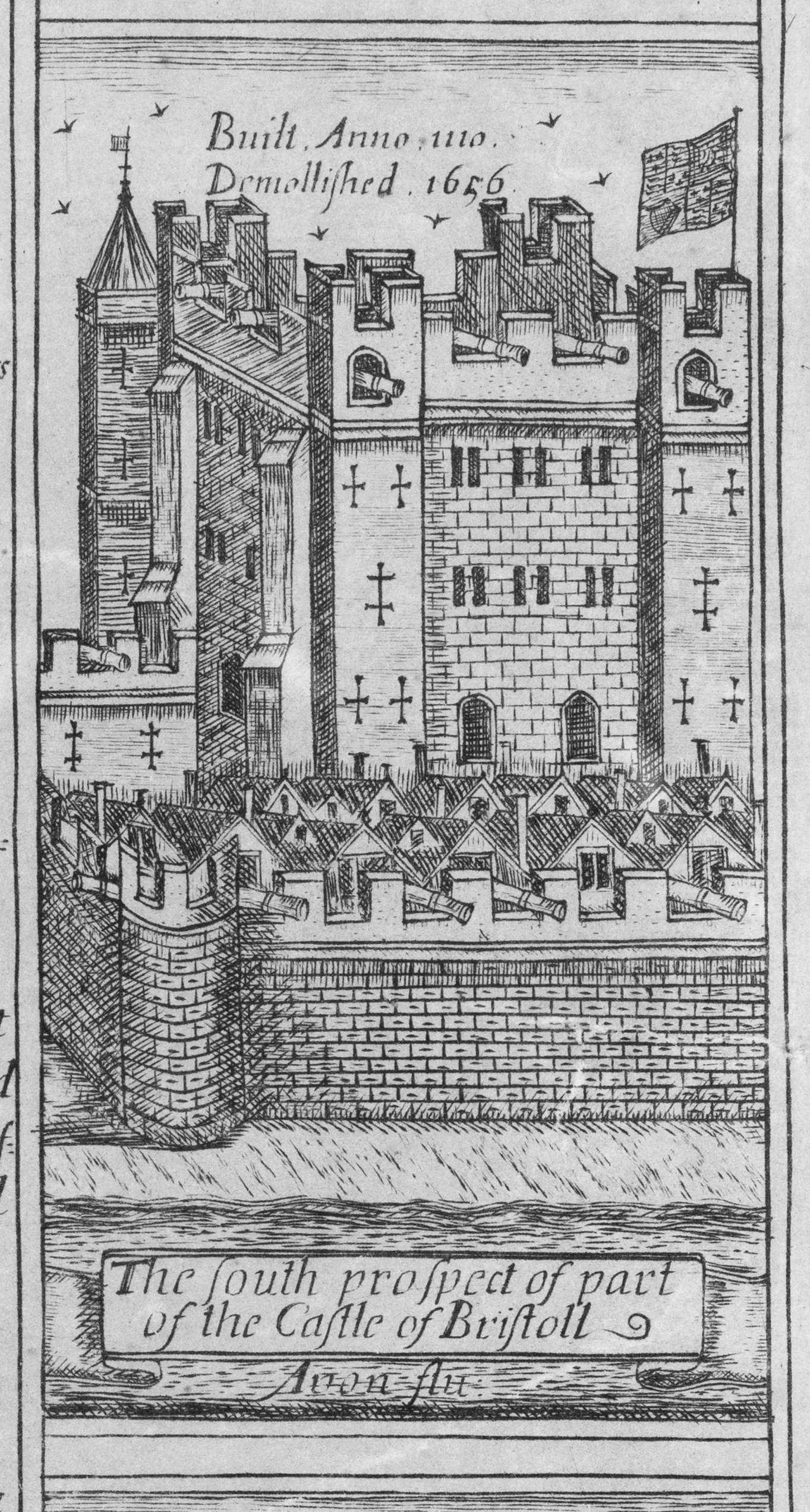
Bristol Castle

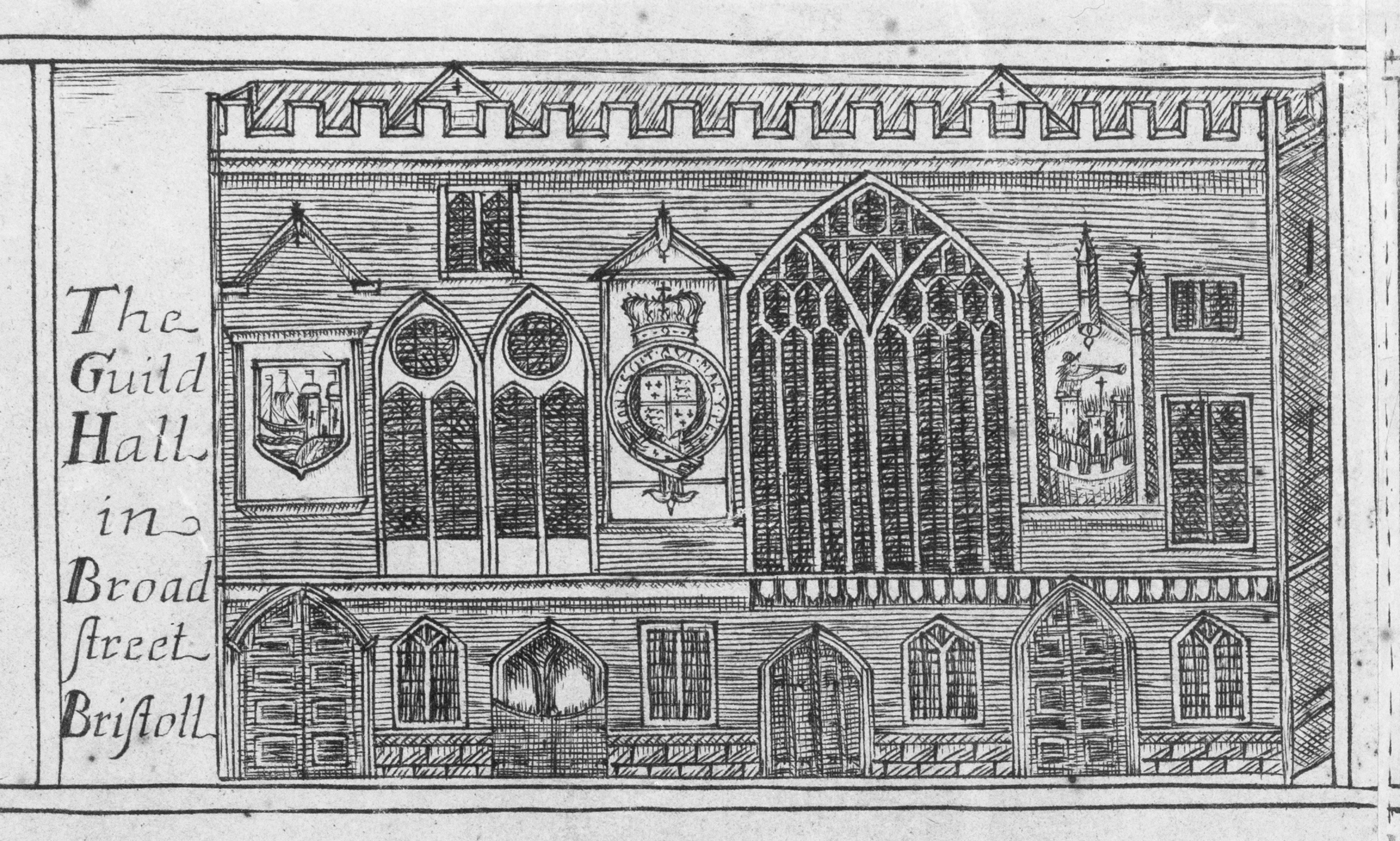
Bristol Guildhall

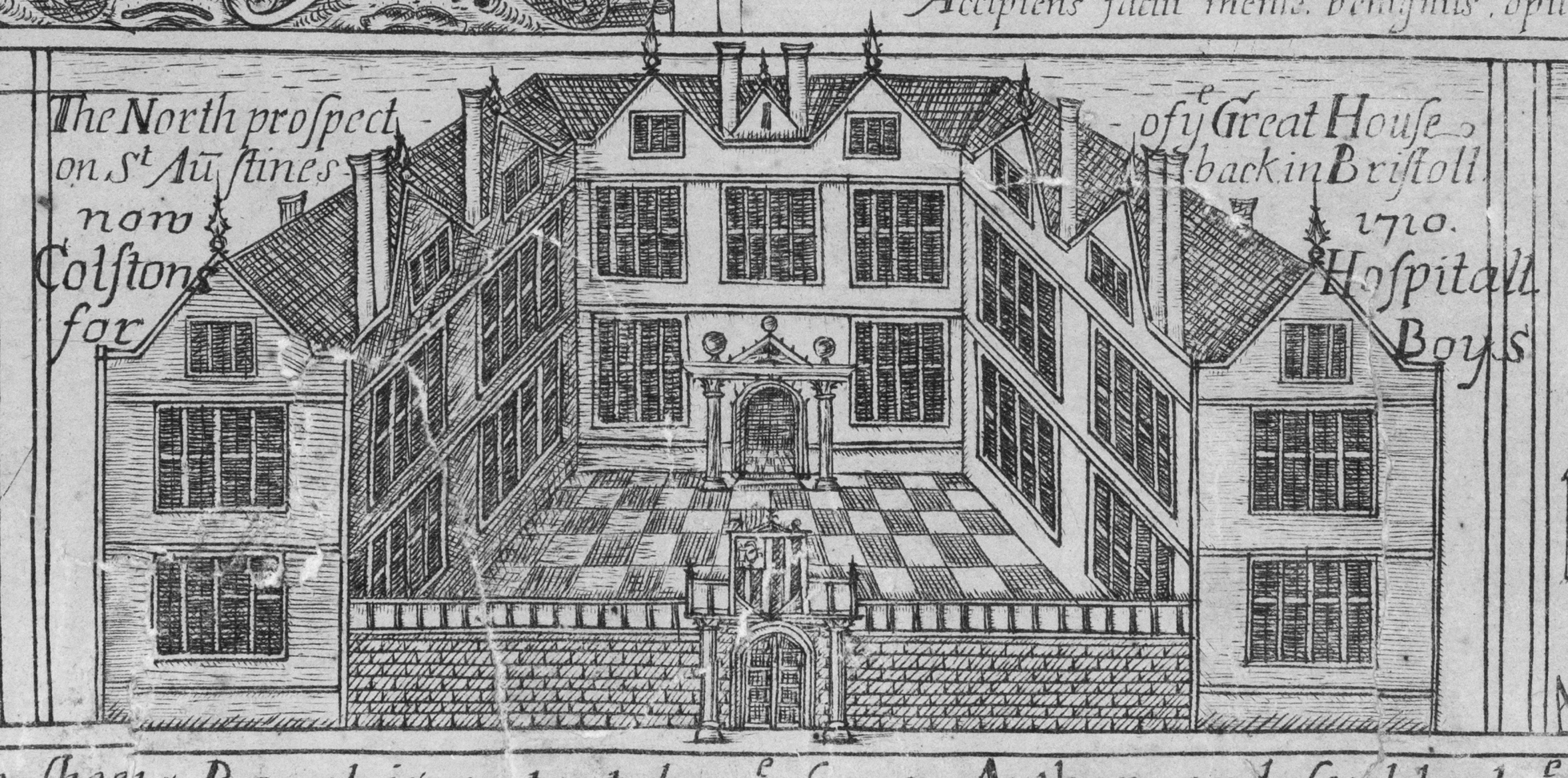
Great House

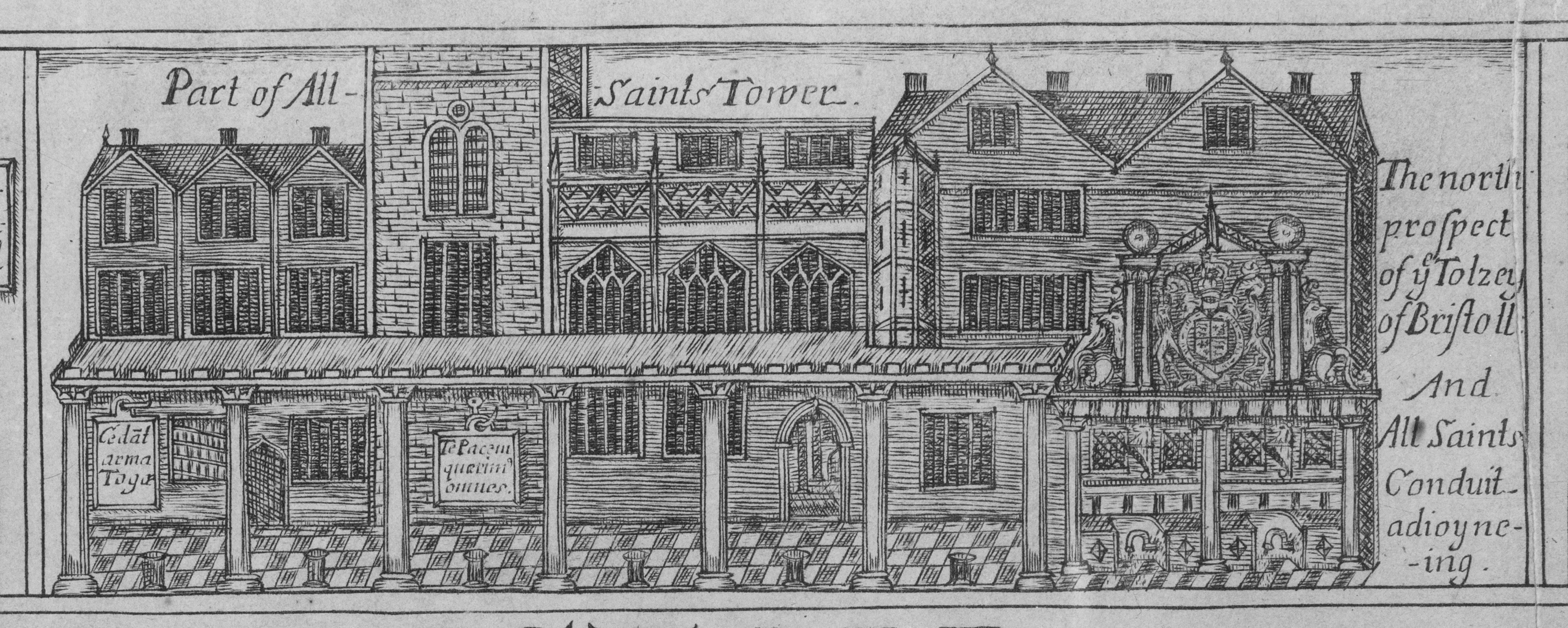
All Saints and Tolzey Court

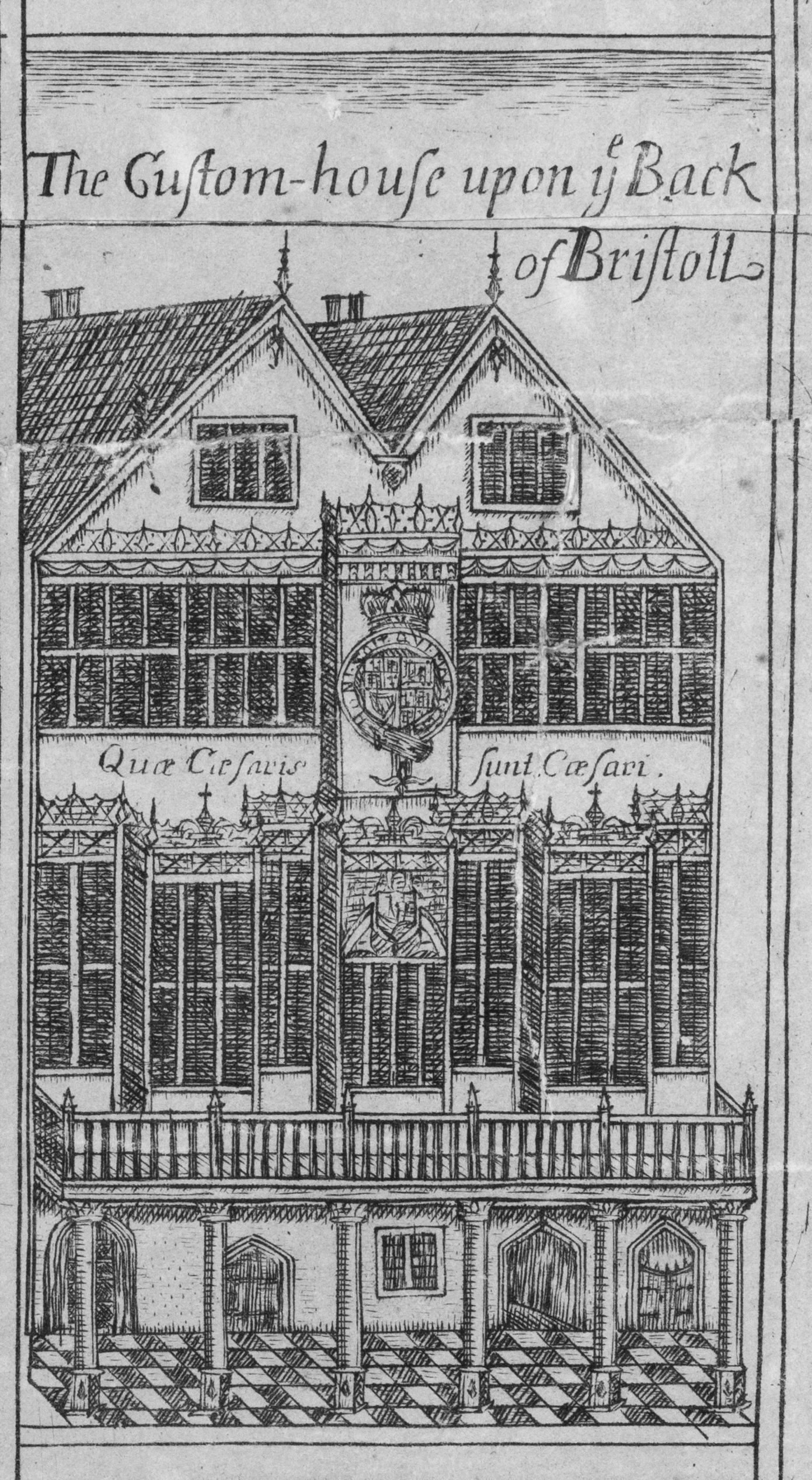
Custom House

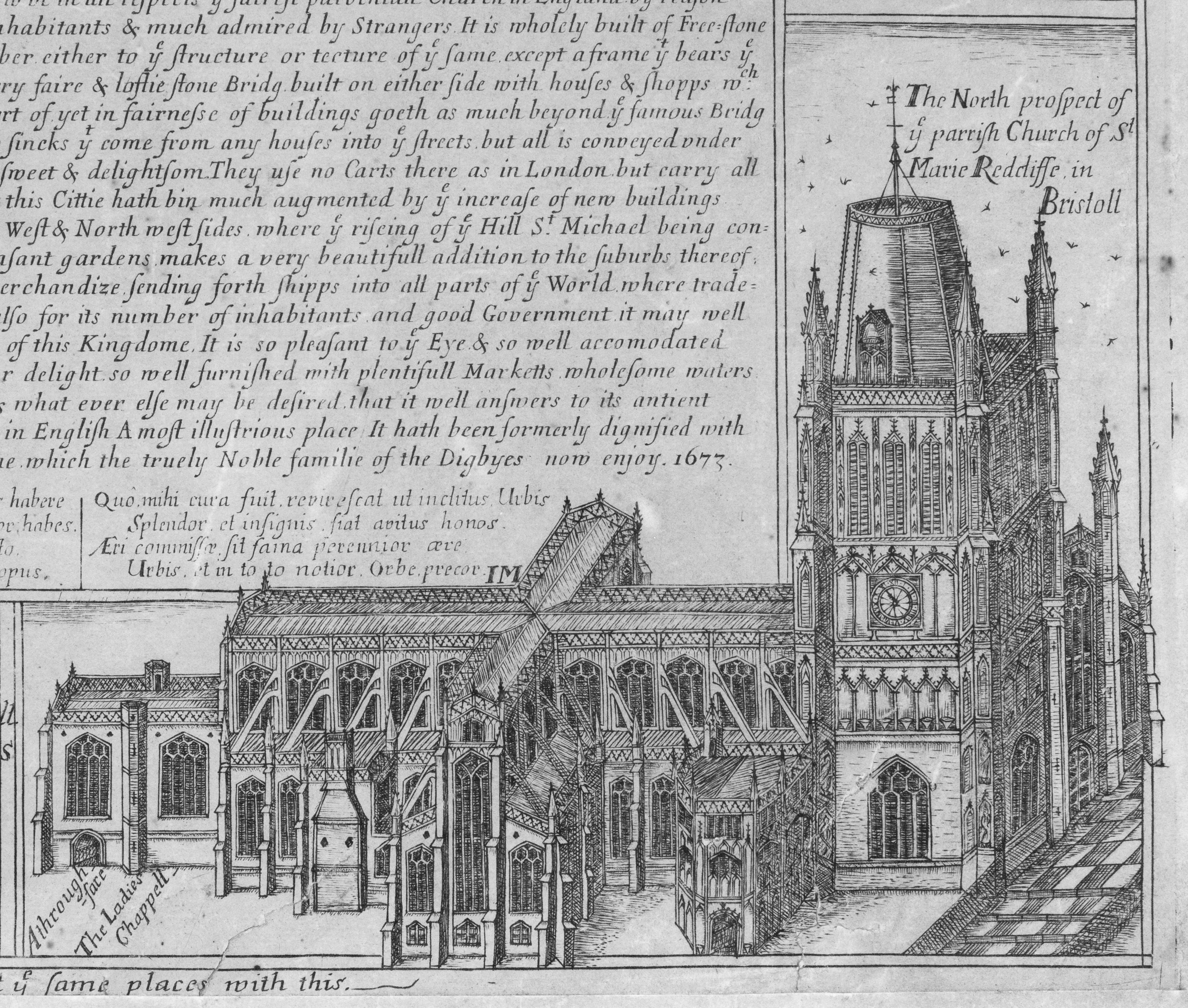
St Mary Redcliffe

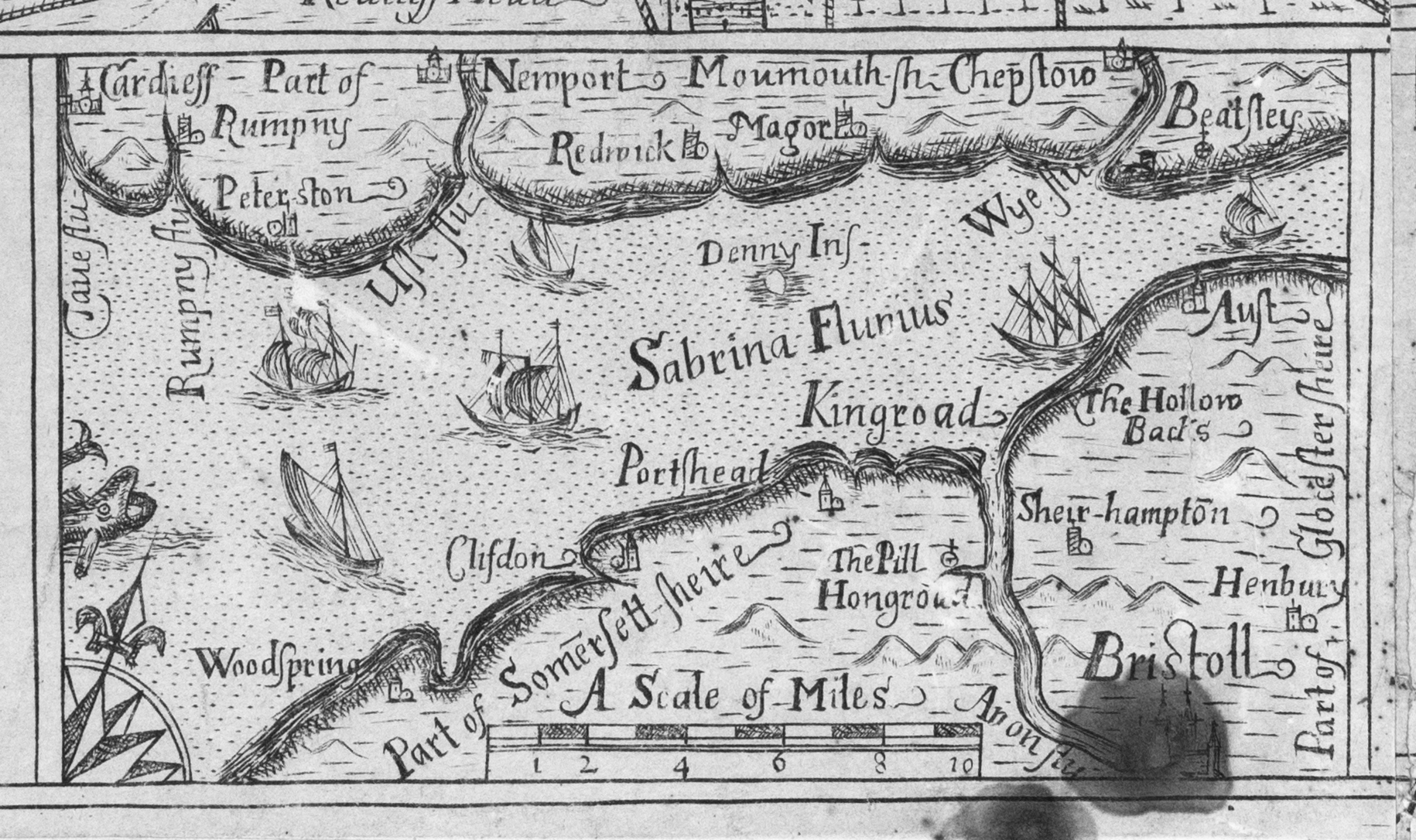
Severn Estuary

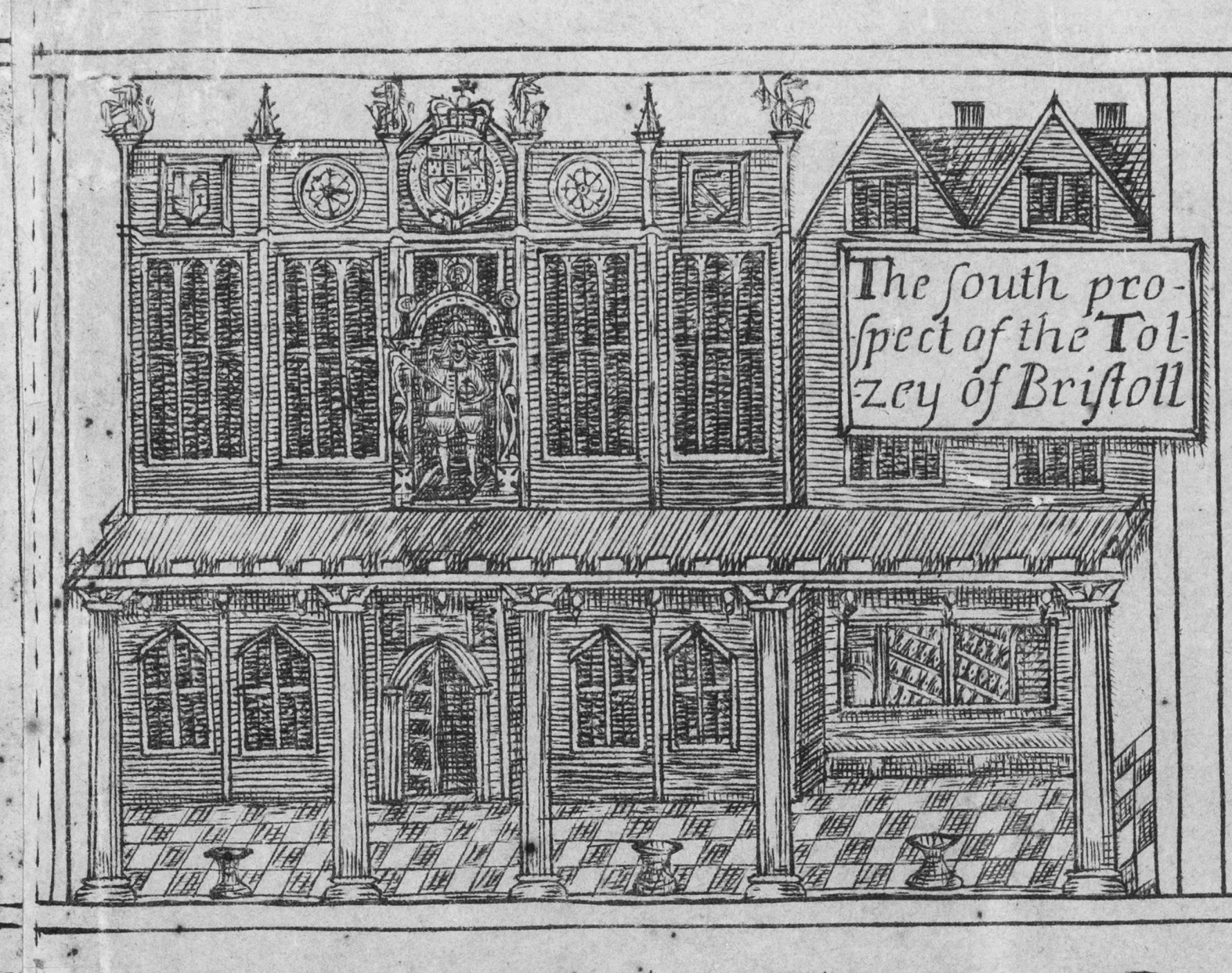
Tolzey SE prospect

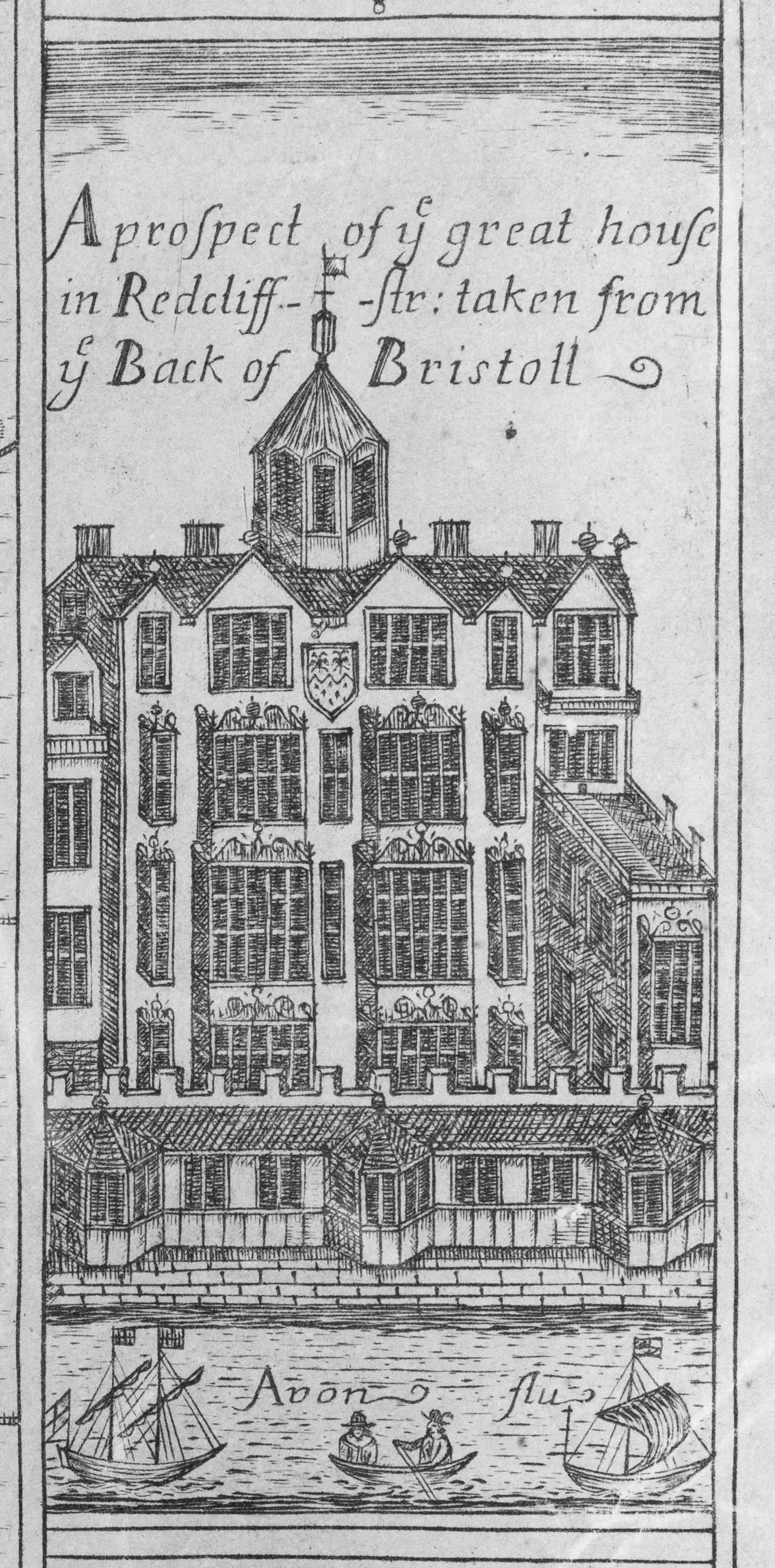
Redcliffe Great House

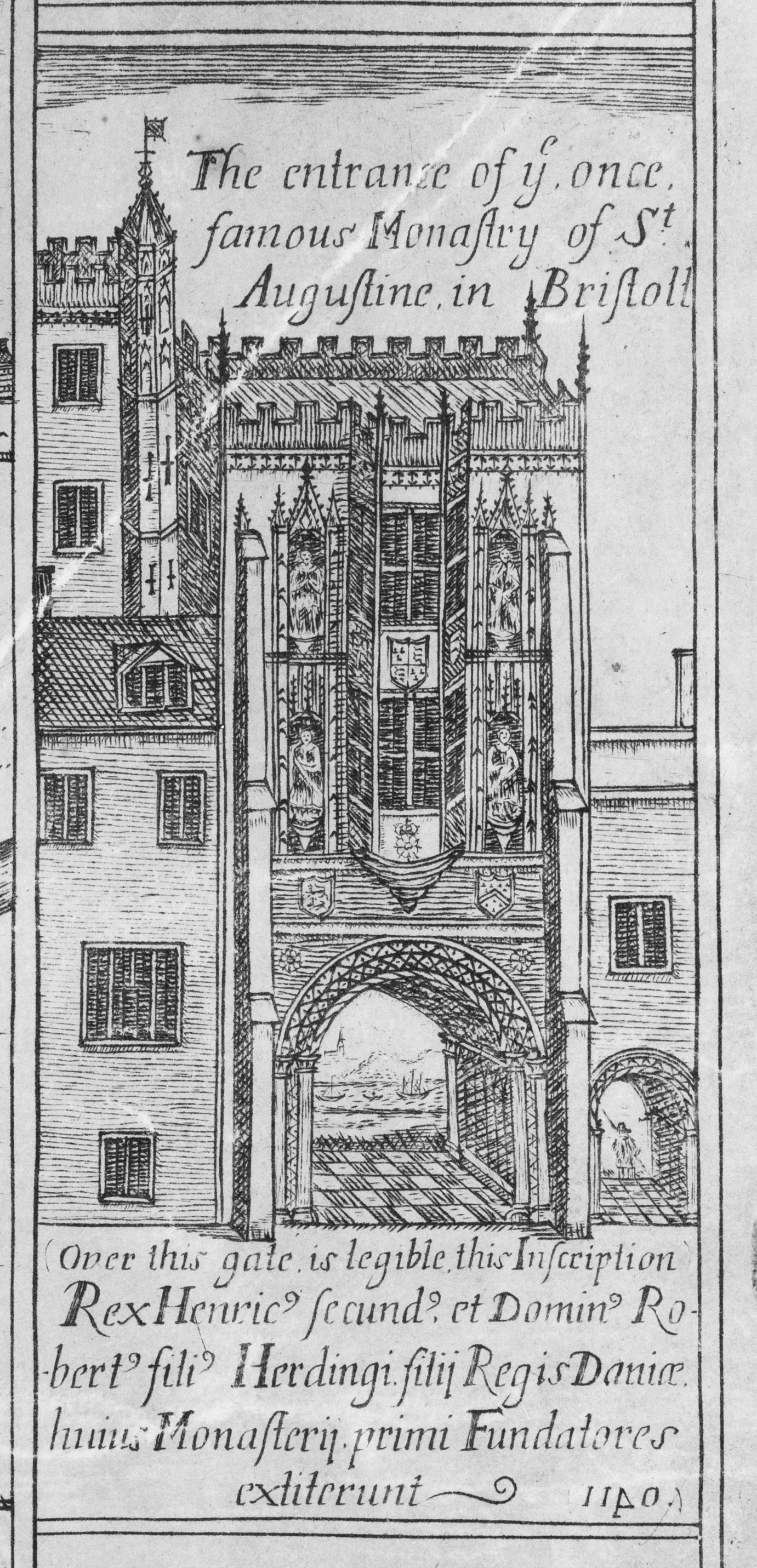
Great Gatehouse

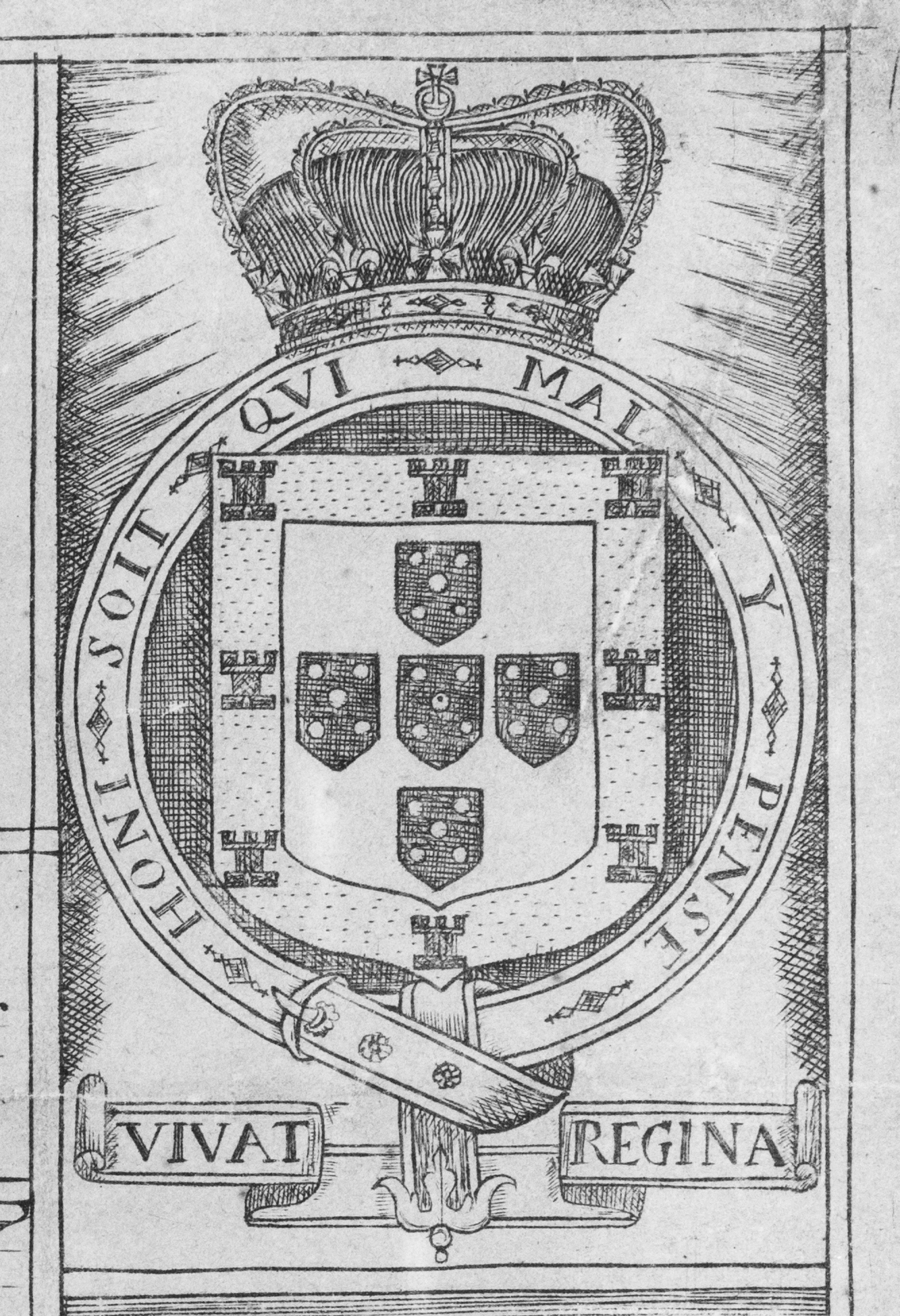
Queen's coat-of-arms

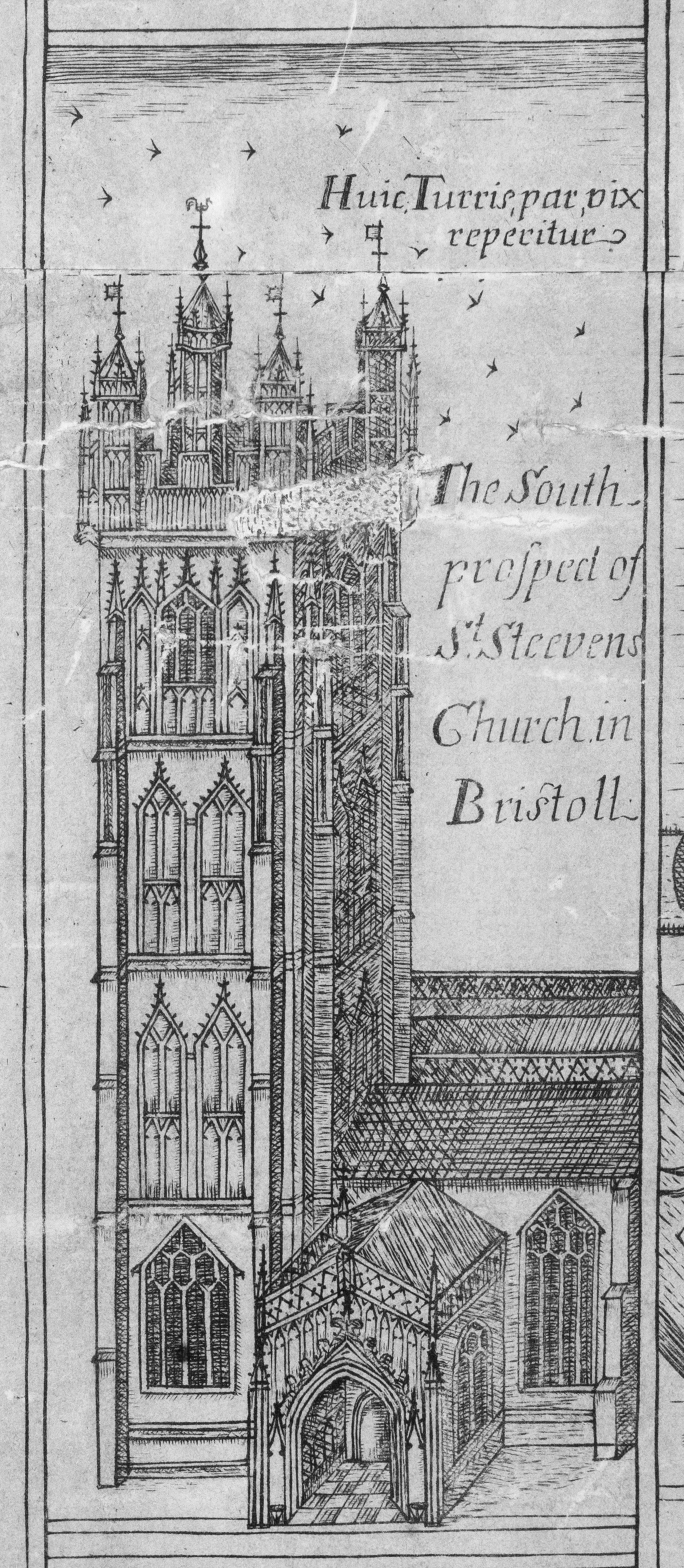
St Stephen's Church

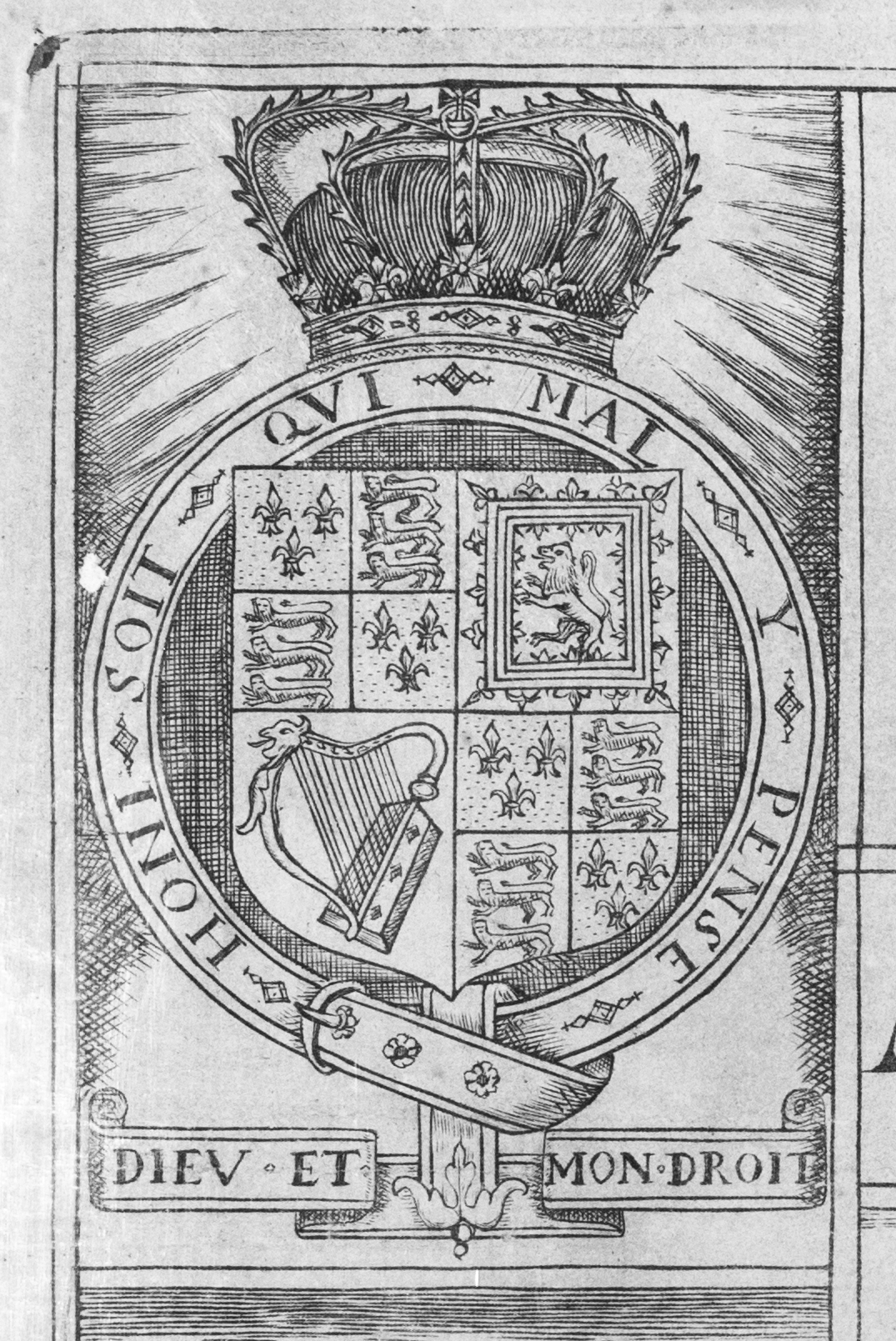
King's coat-of-arms

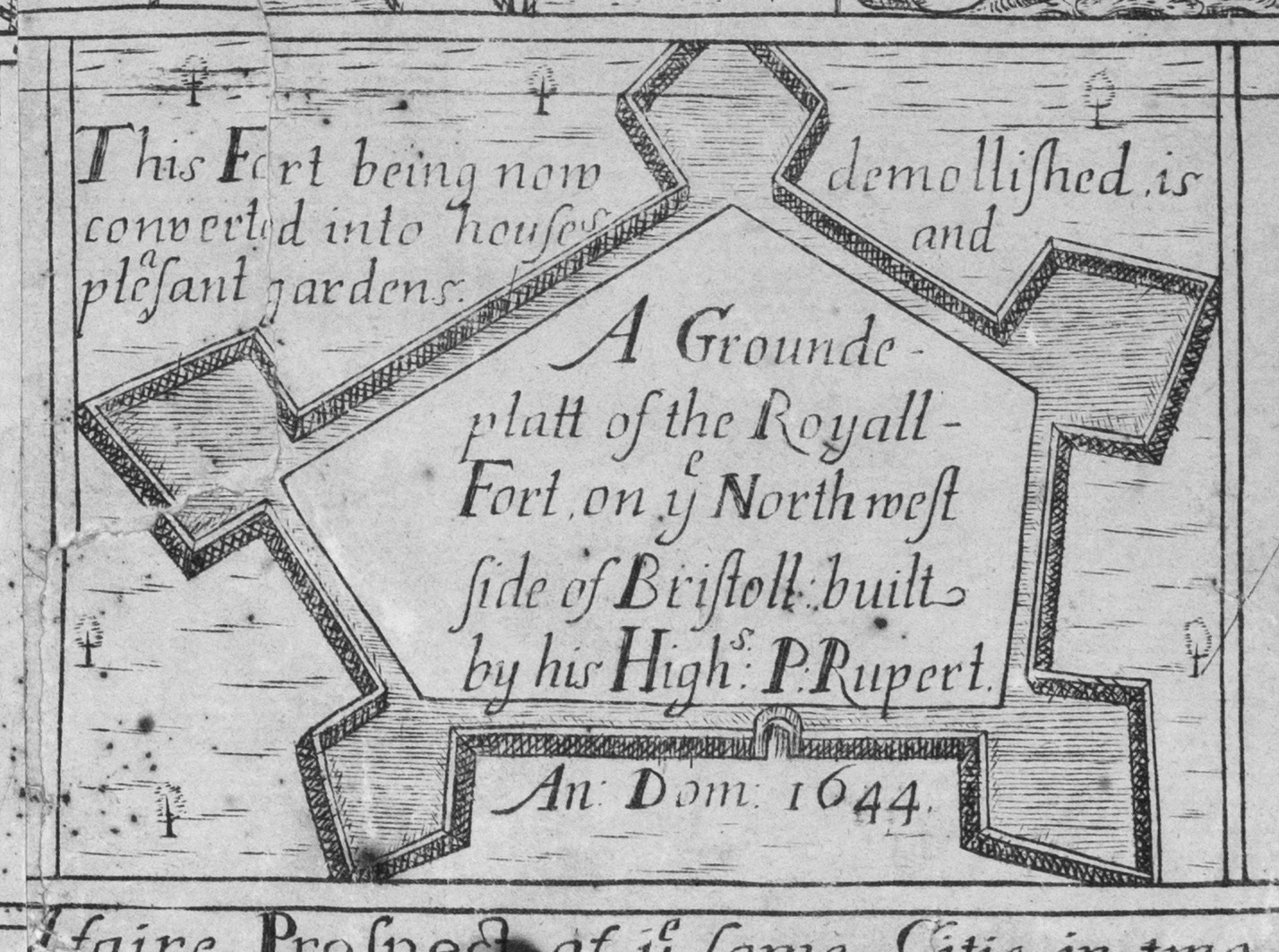
Royal Fort plan

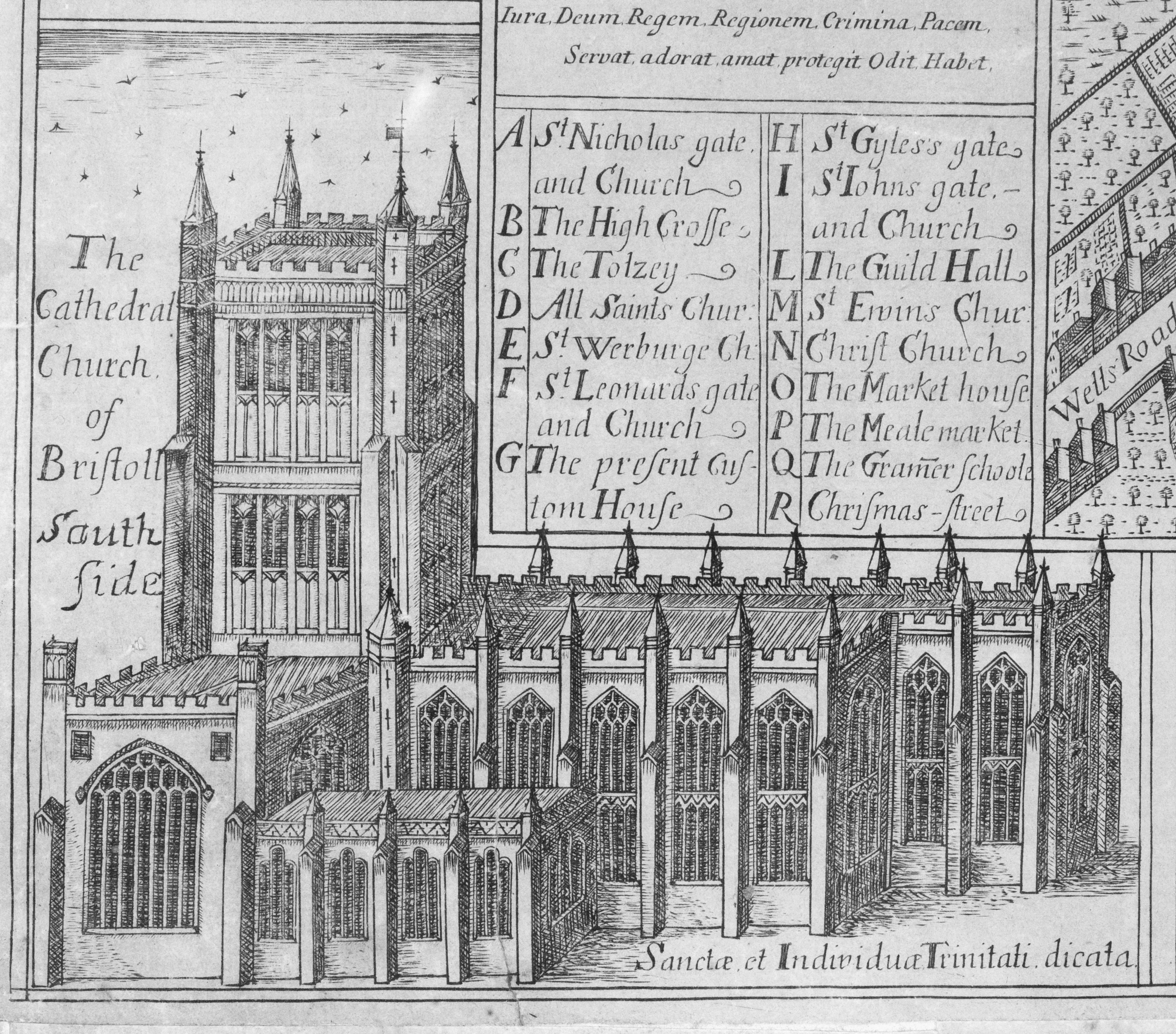
Bristol Cathedral

Millerd's prospect The Citty of Bristoll in sections (high resolution)

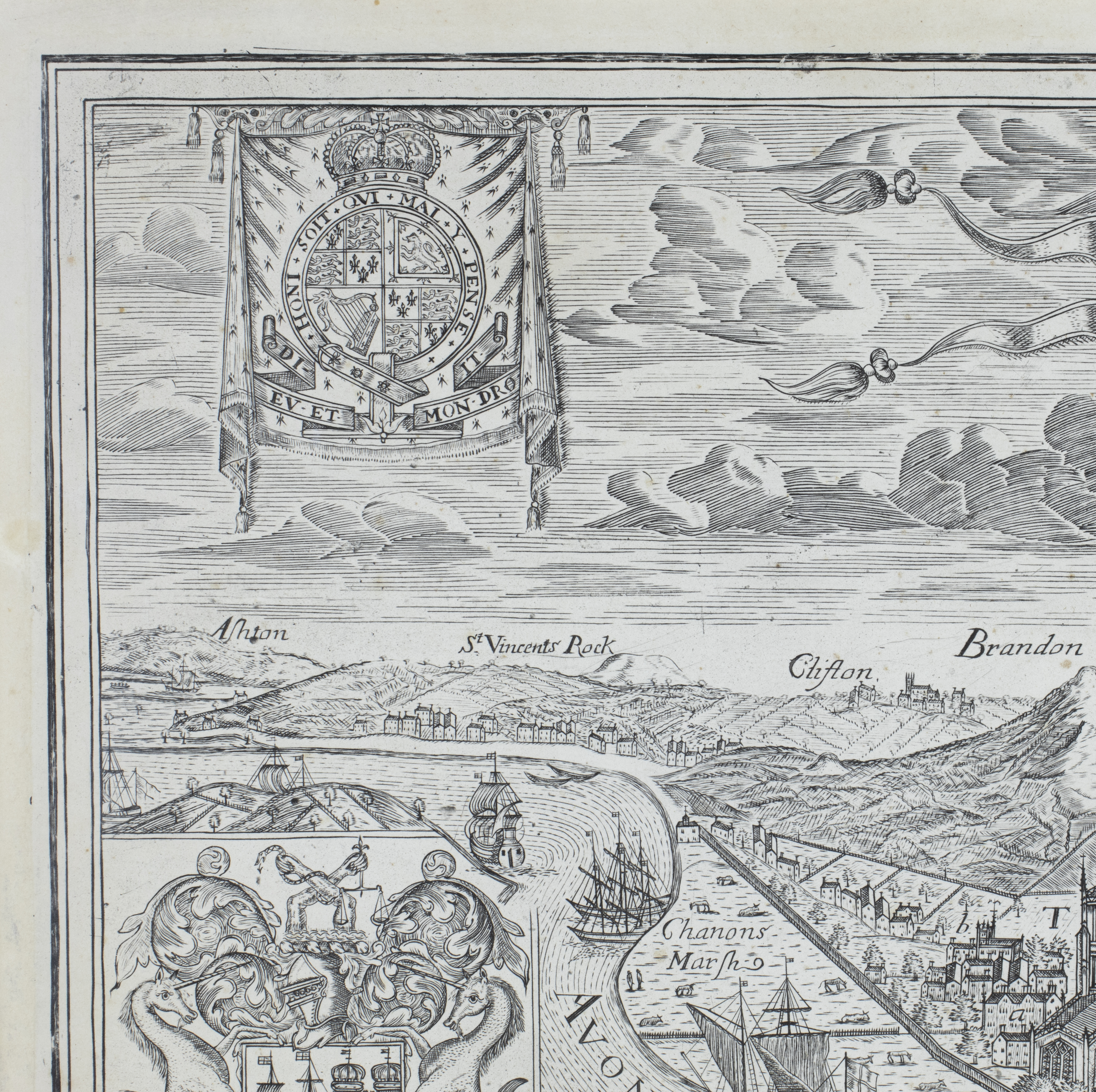

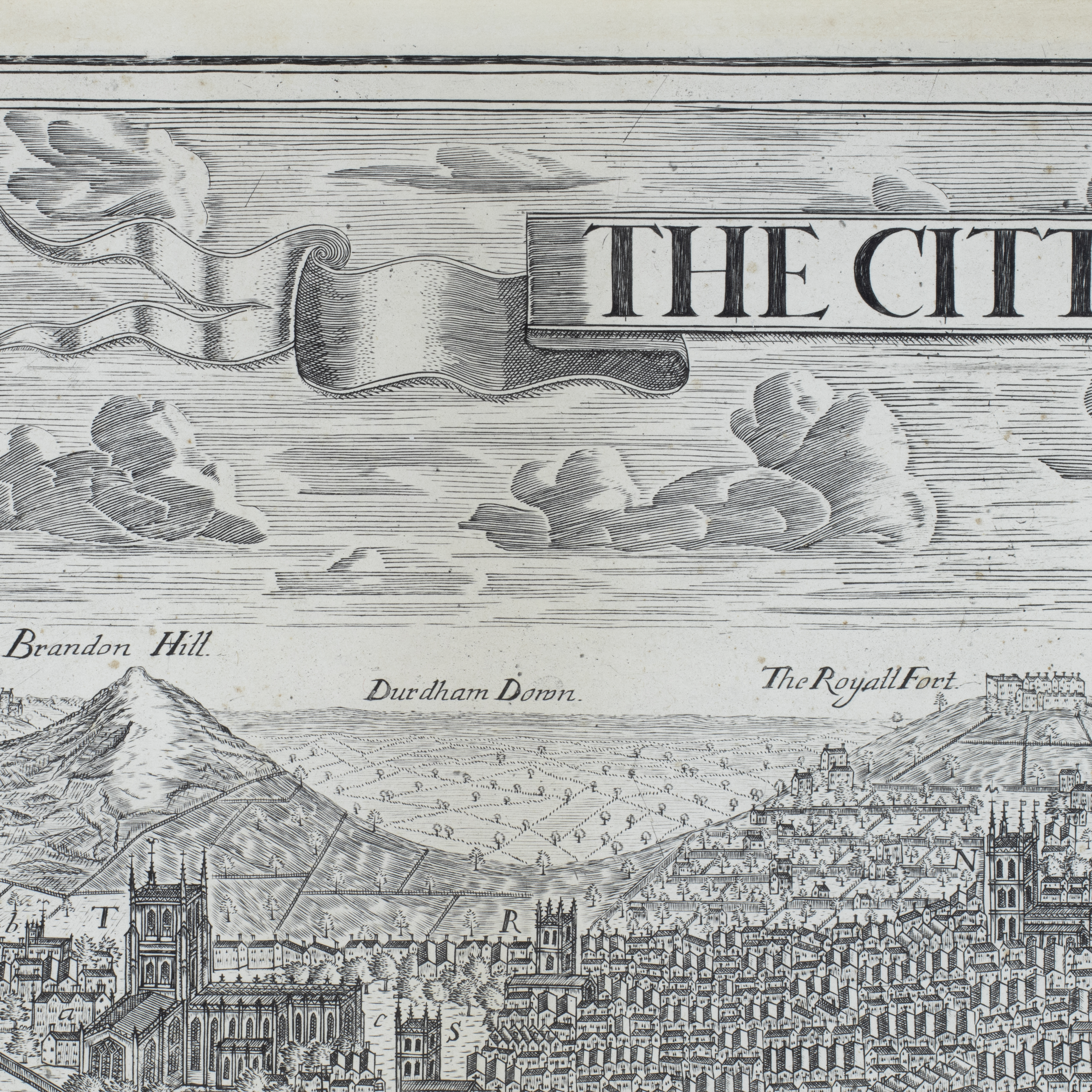

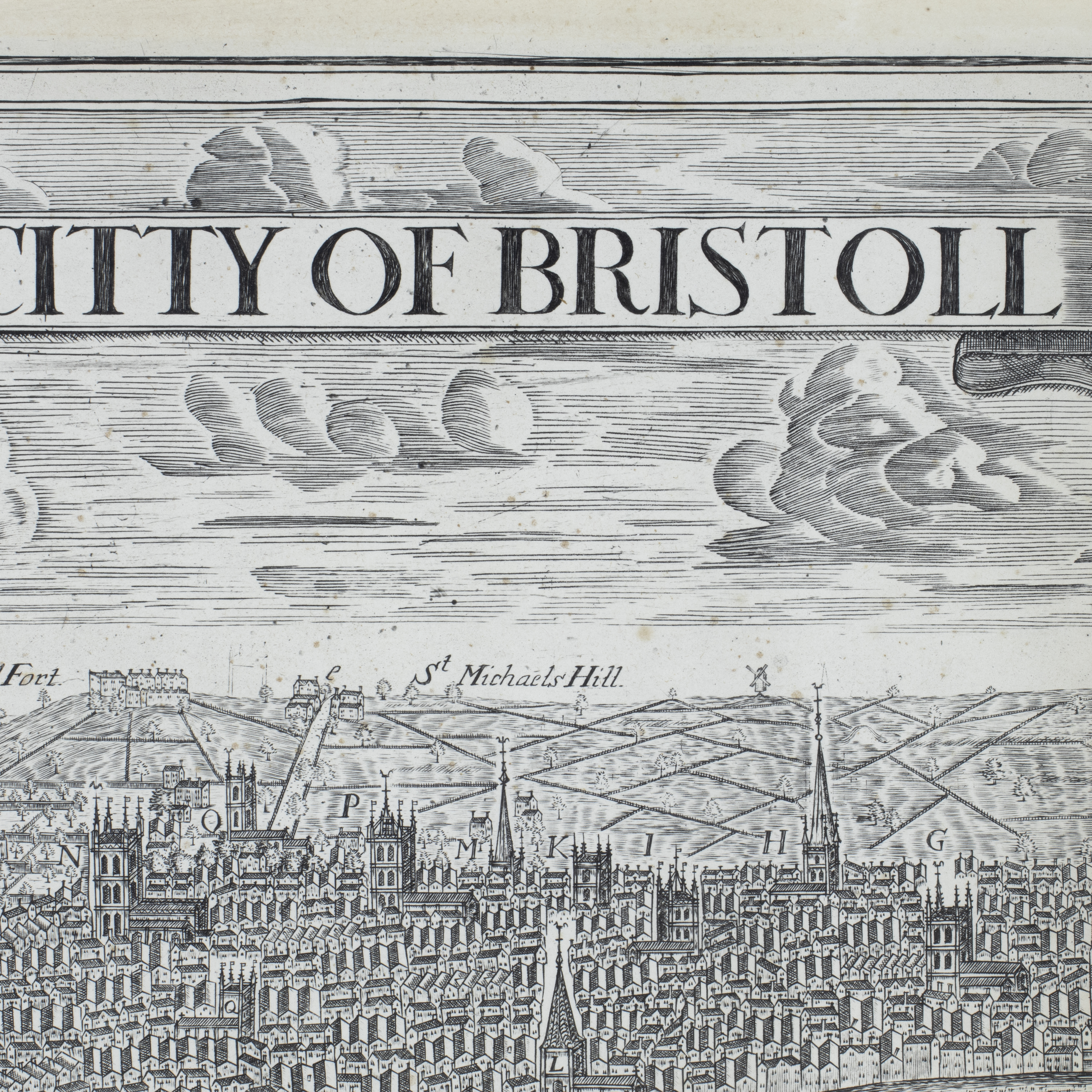

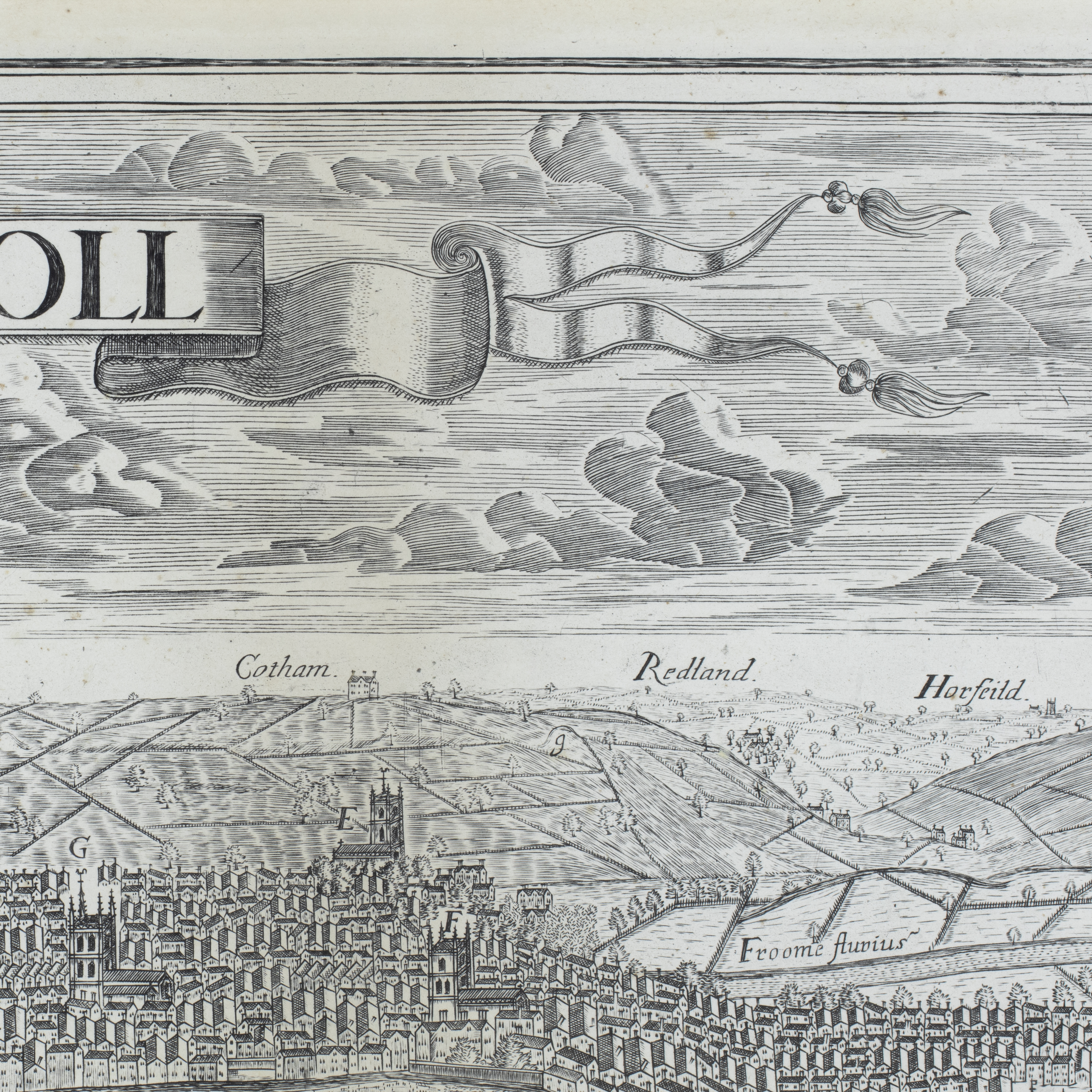

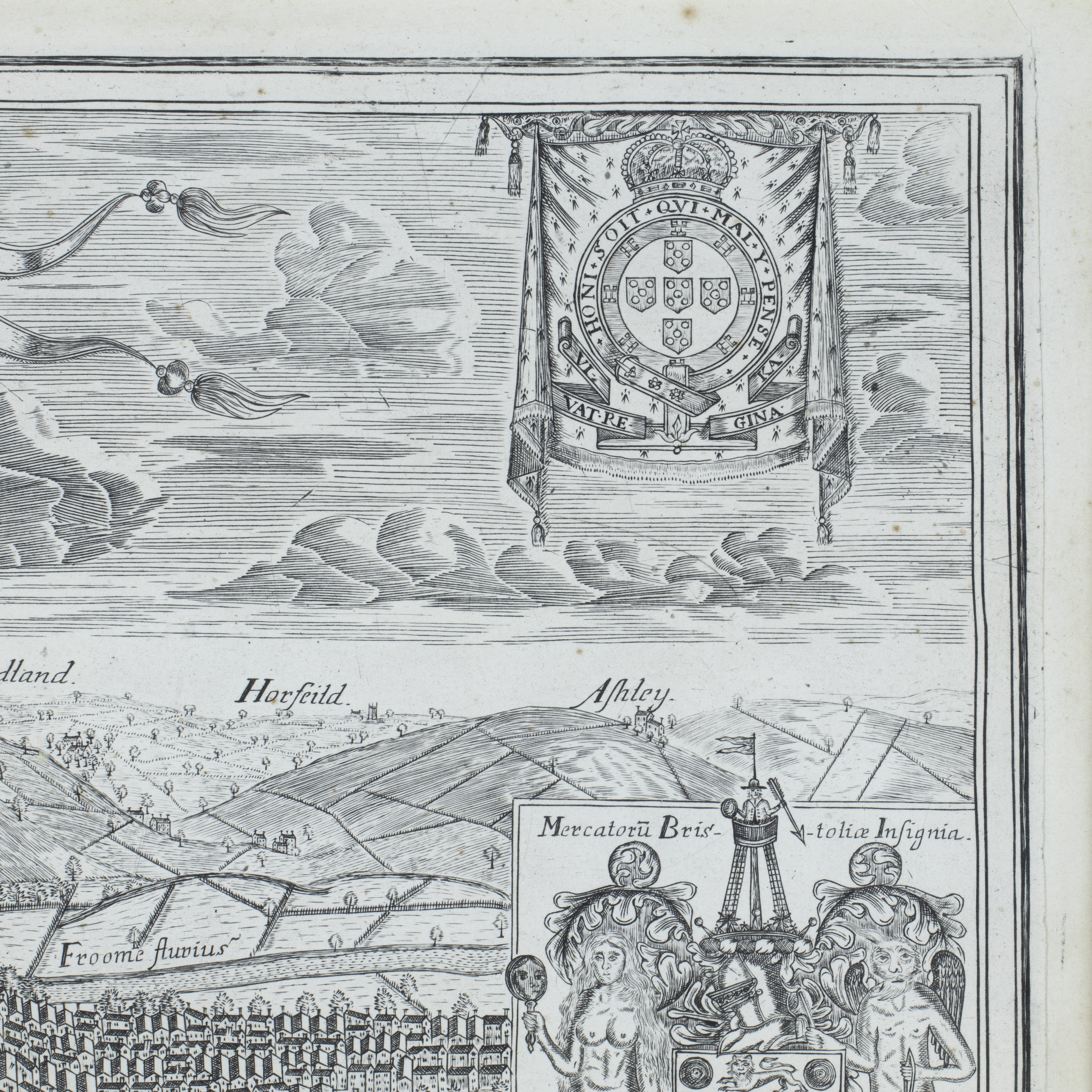

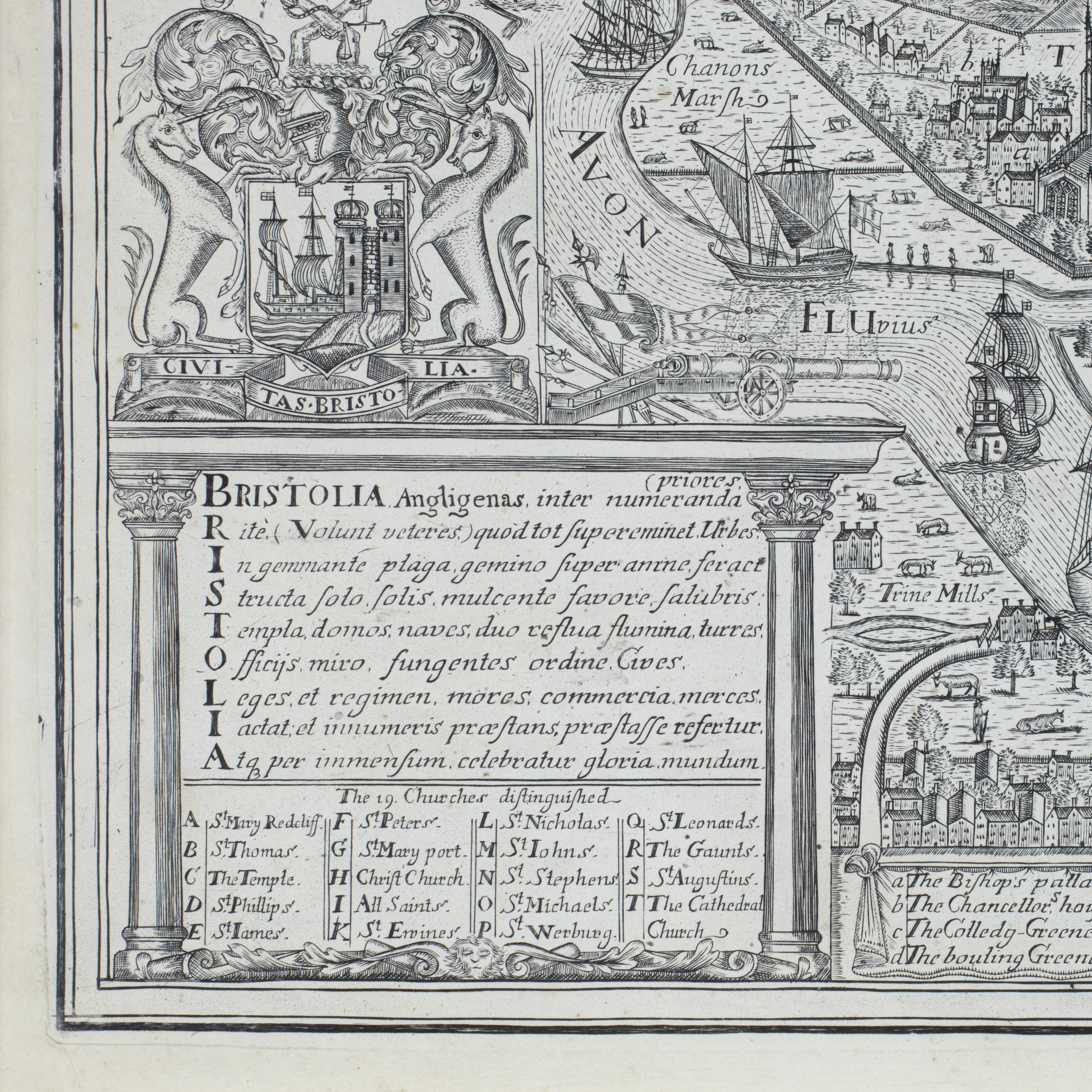

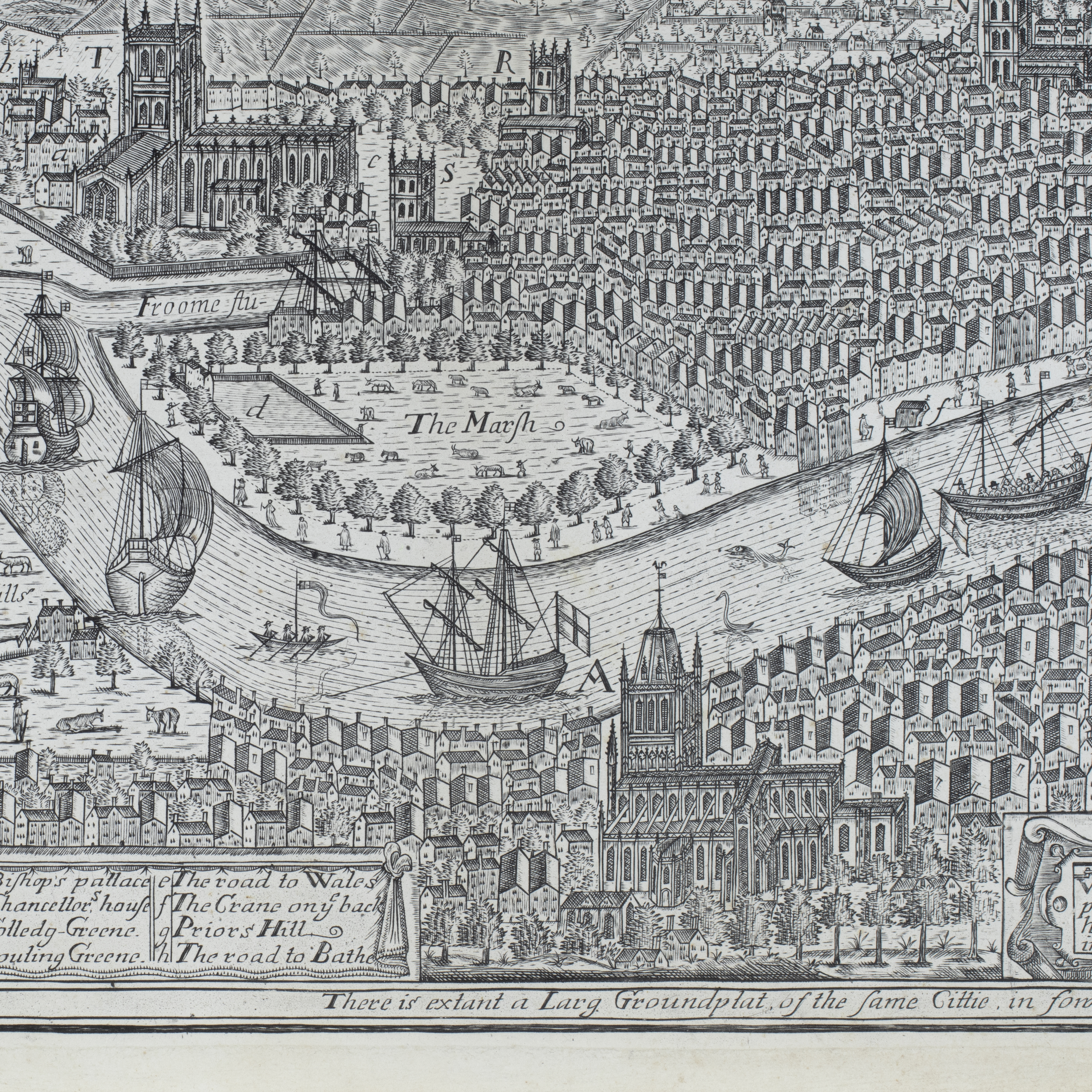

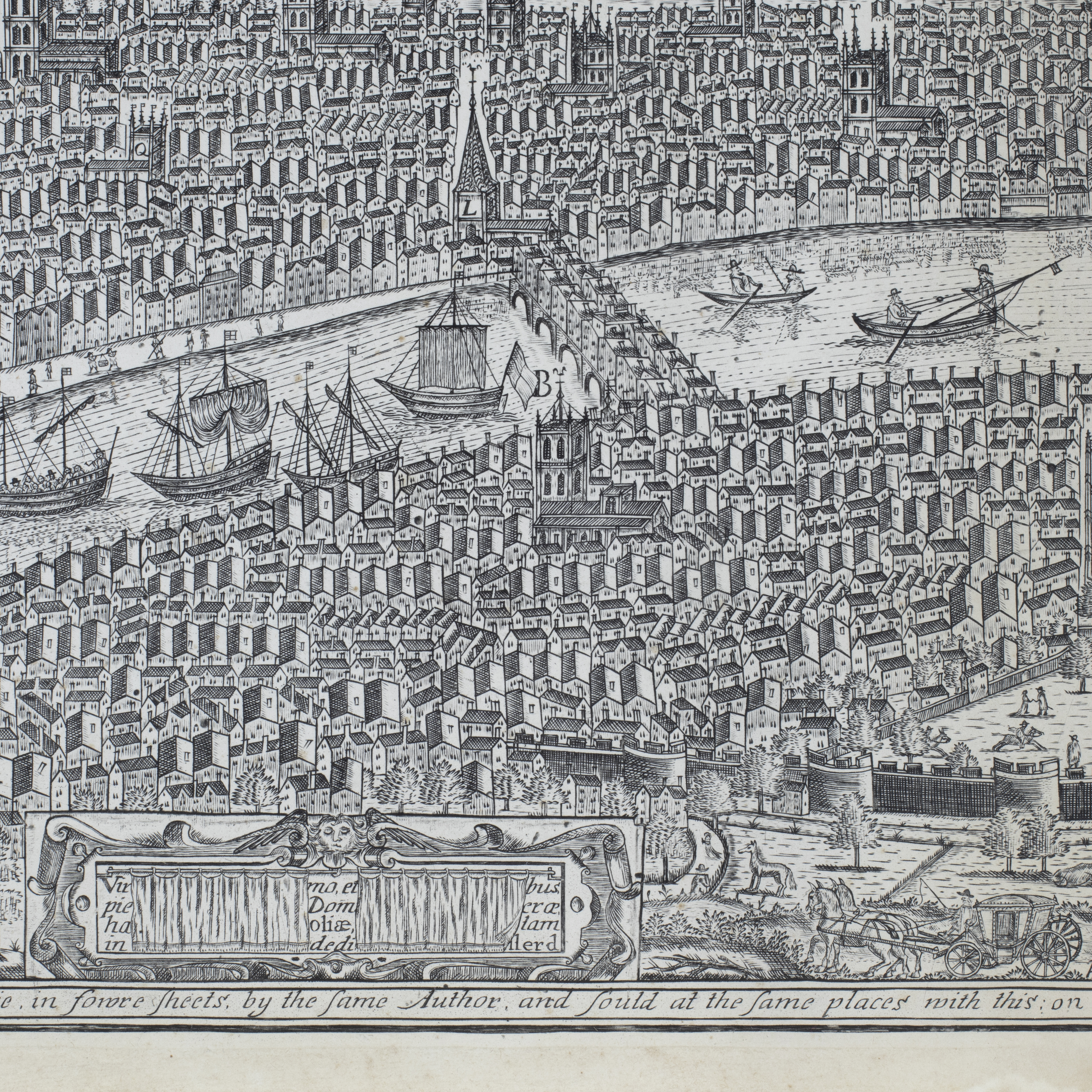

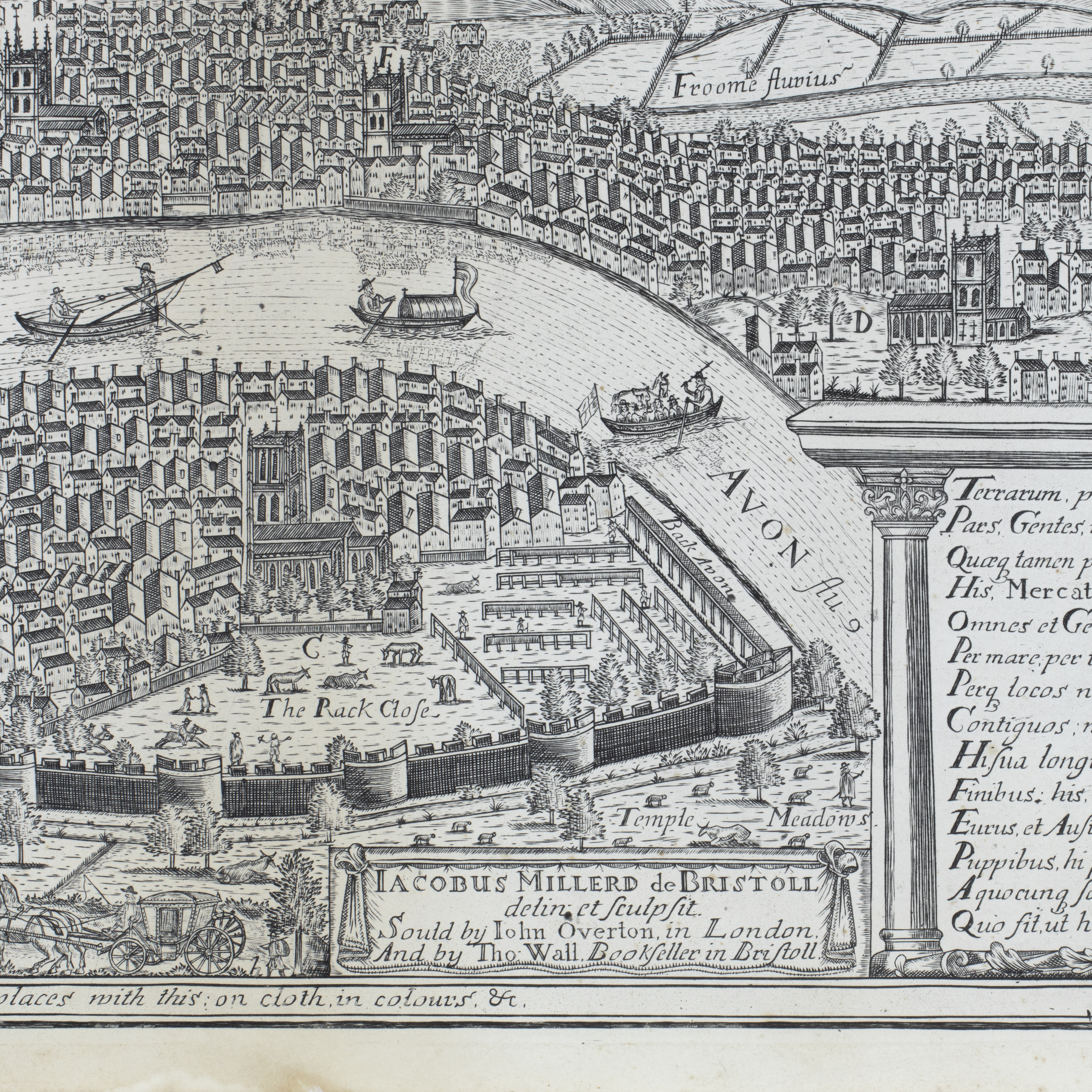

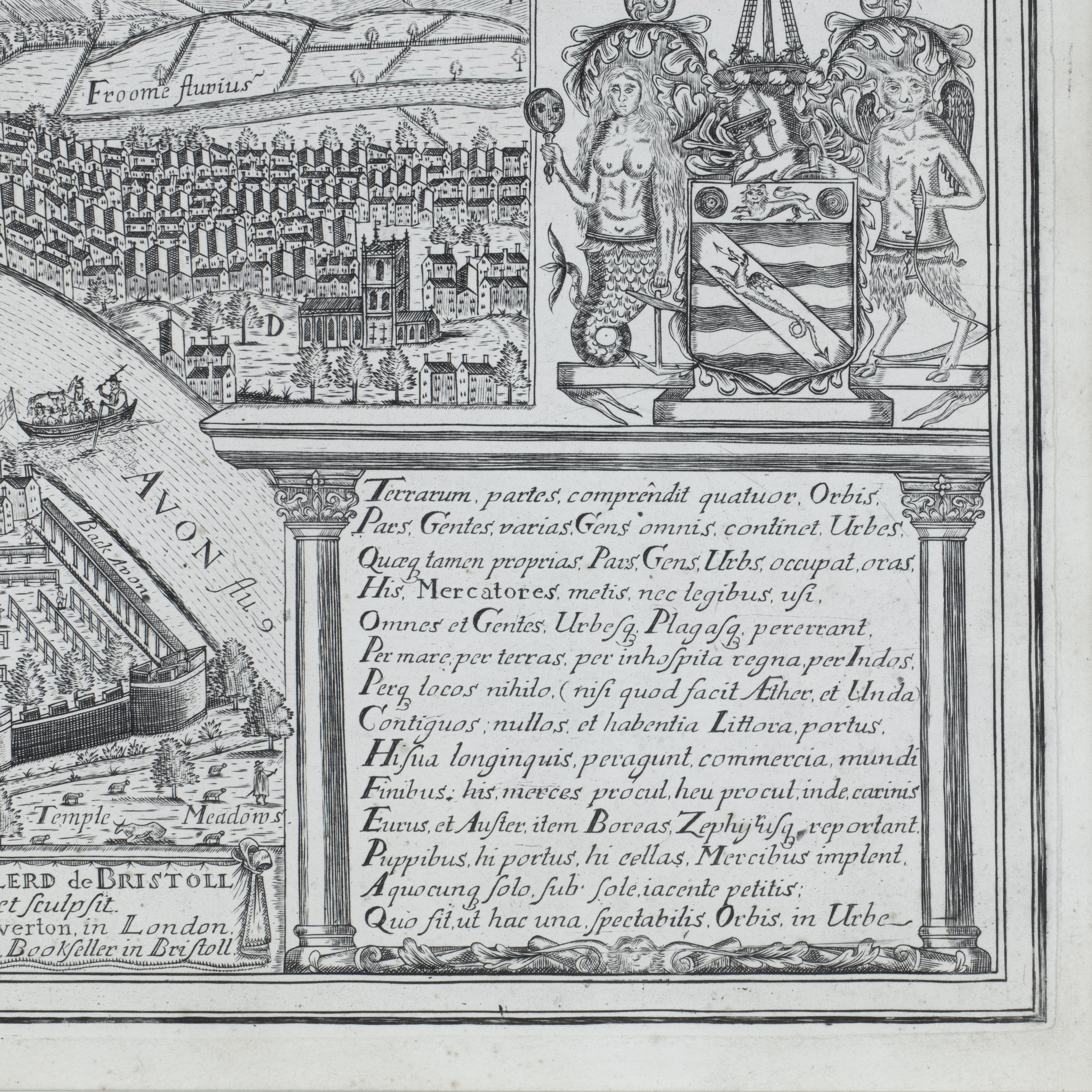
Details from Millerd's The Citty of Bristoll (1673)

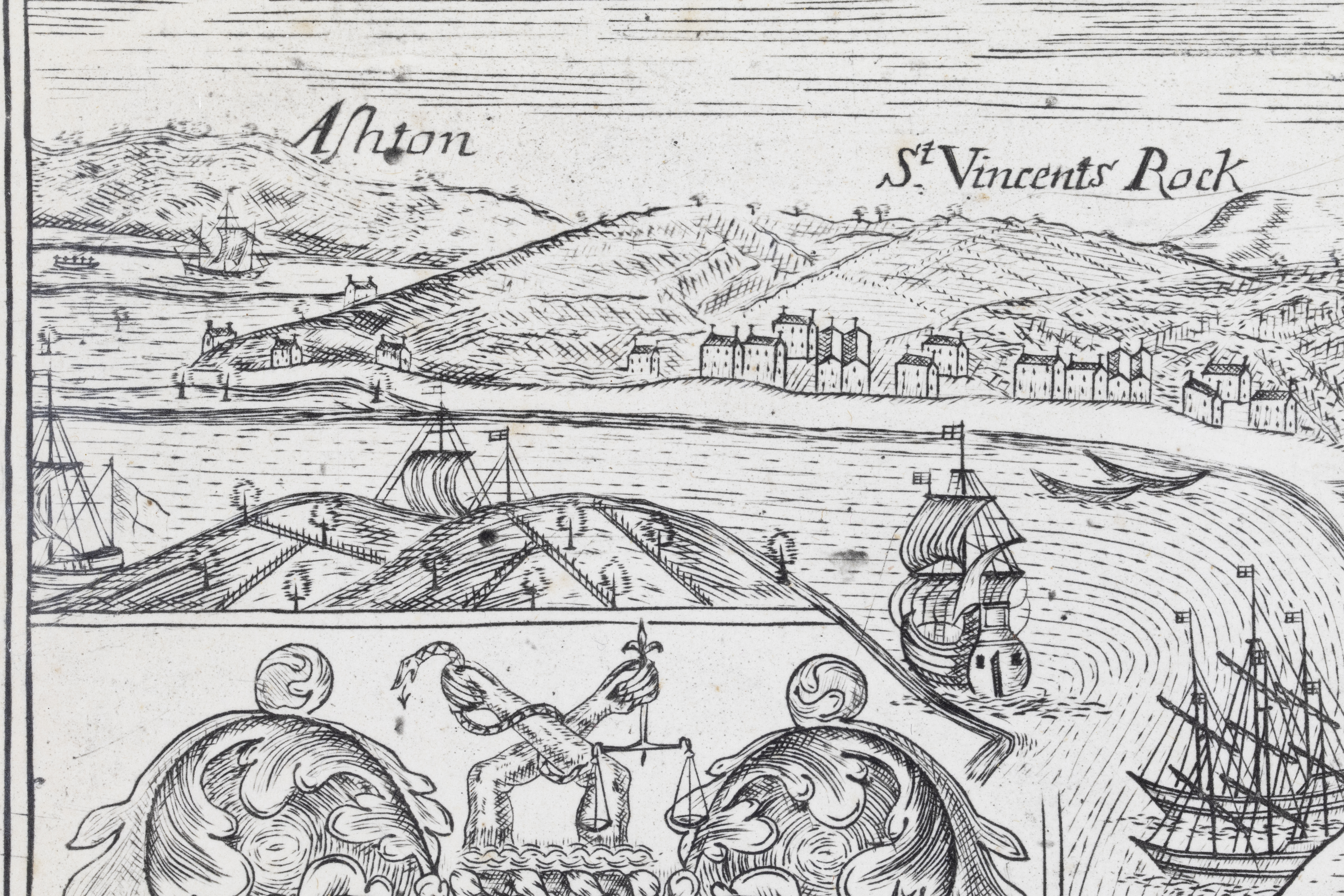
Ashton and St Vincent's Rock

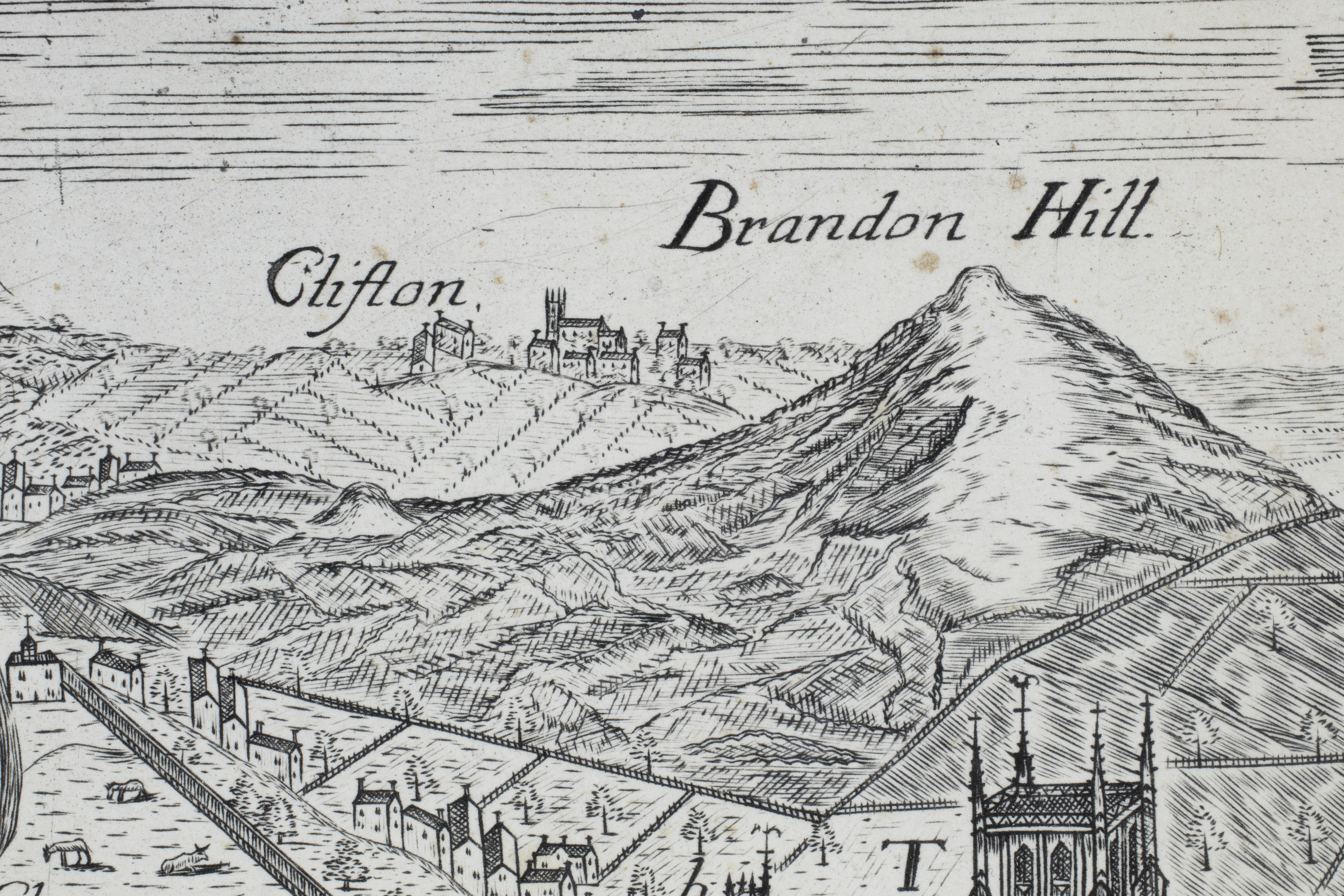
Clifton and Brandon Hill

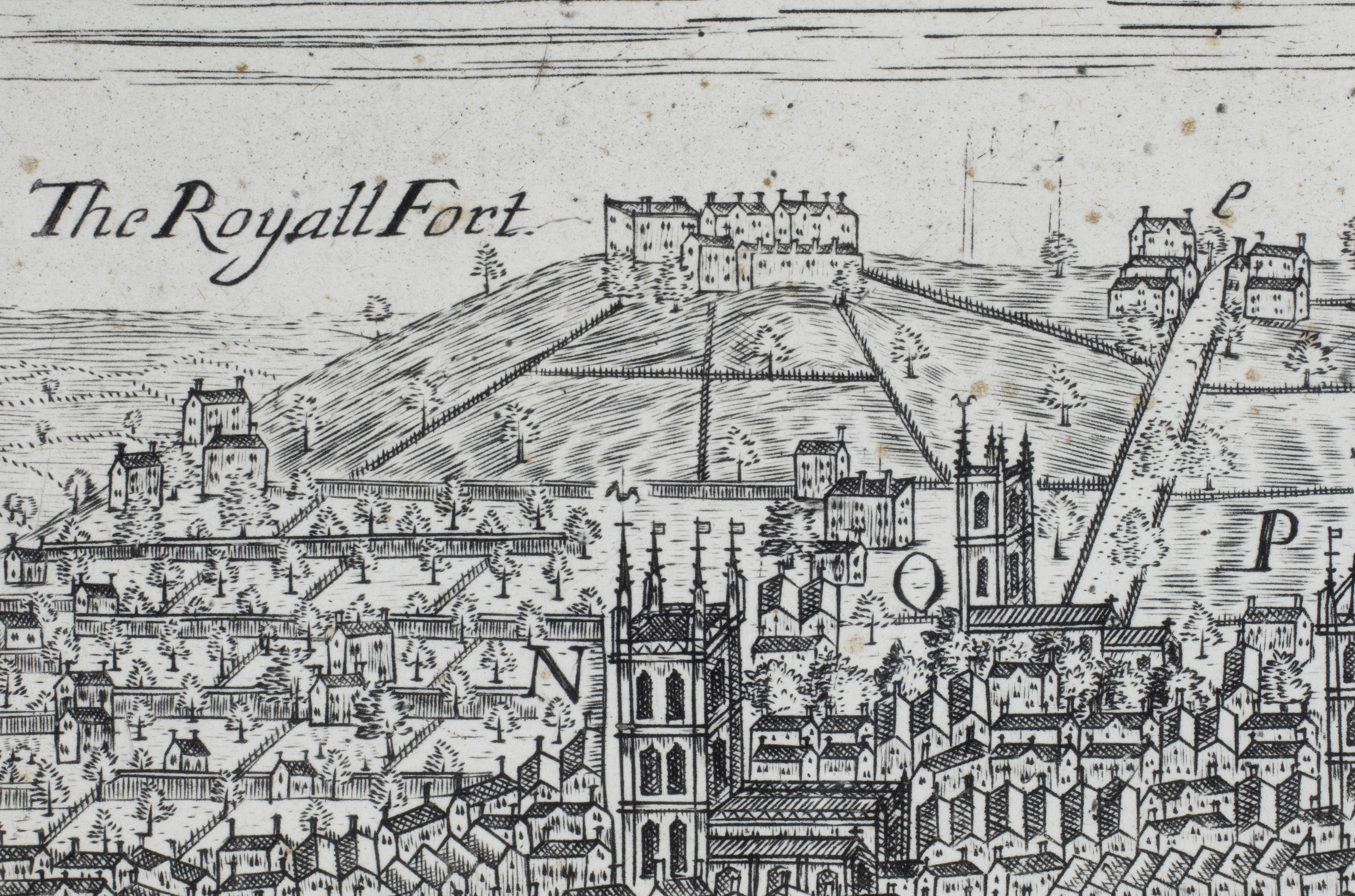
Royal Fort

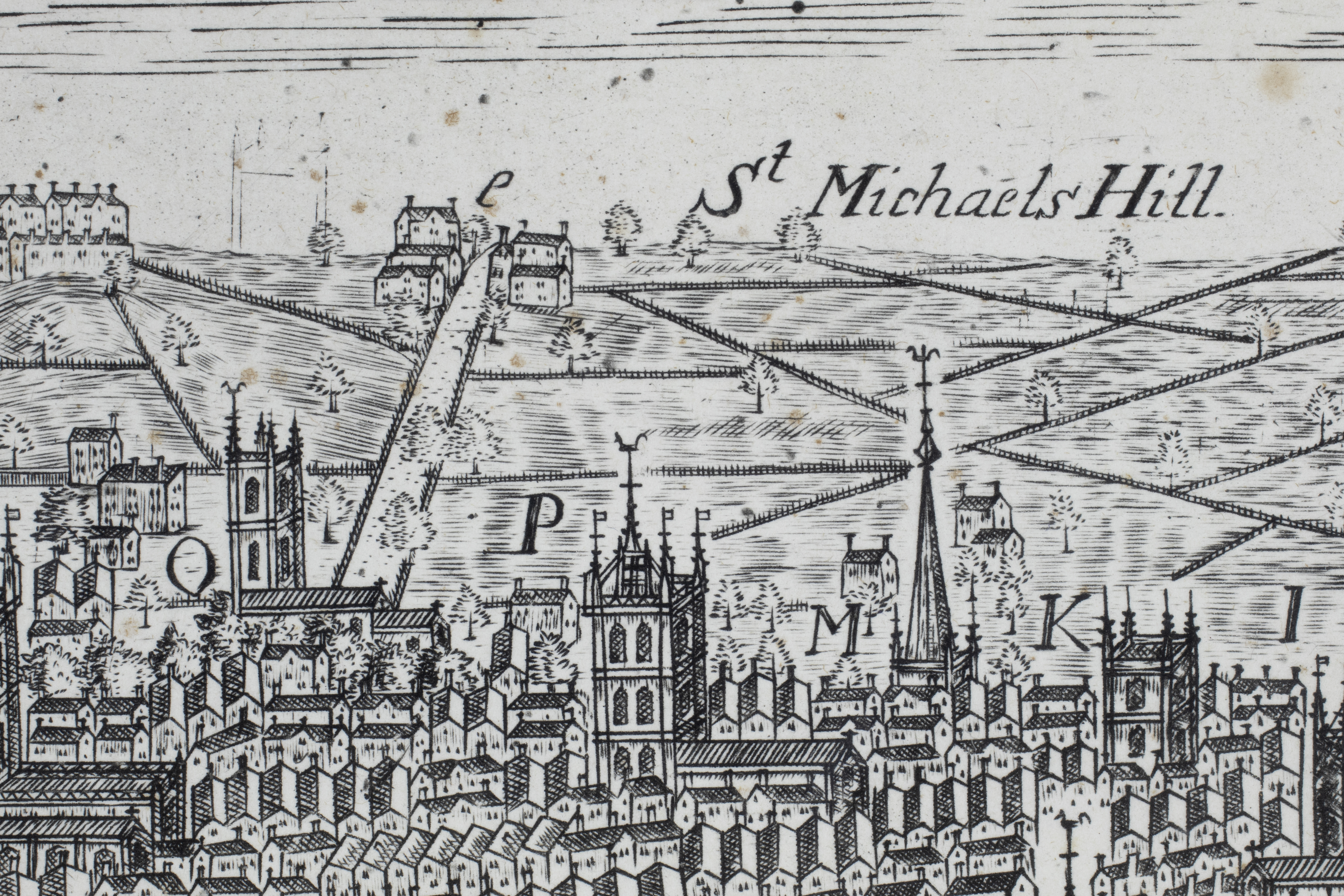
St Michael's Hill

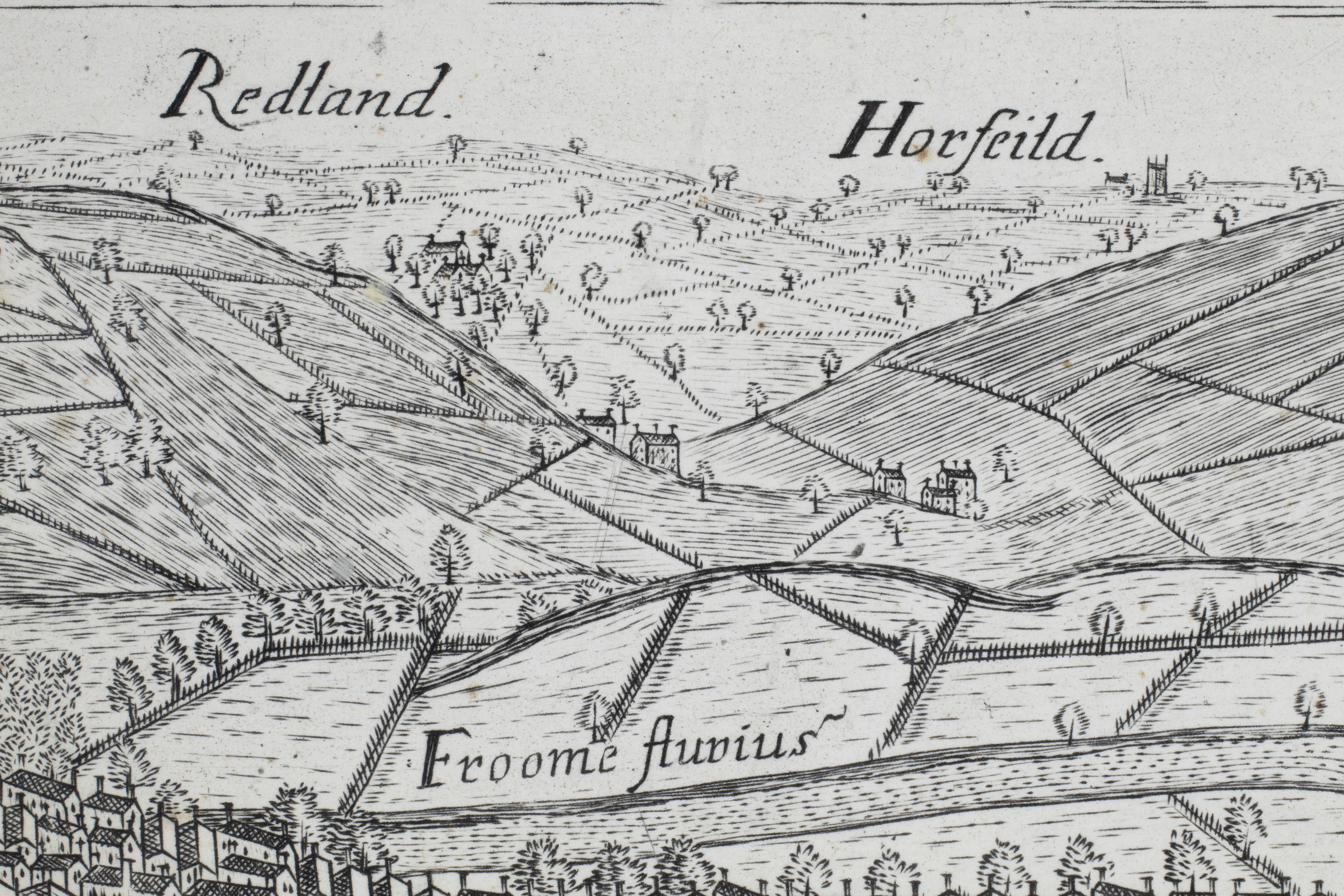
Redland & Horfield

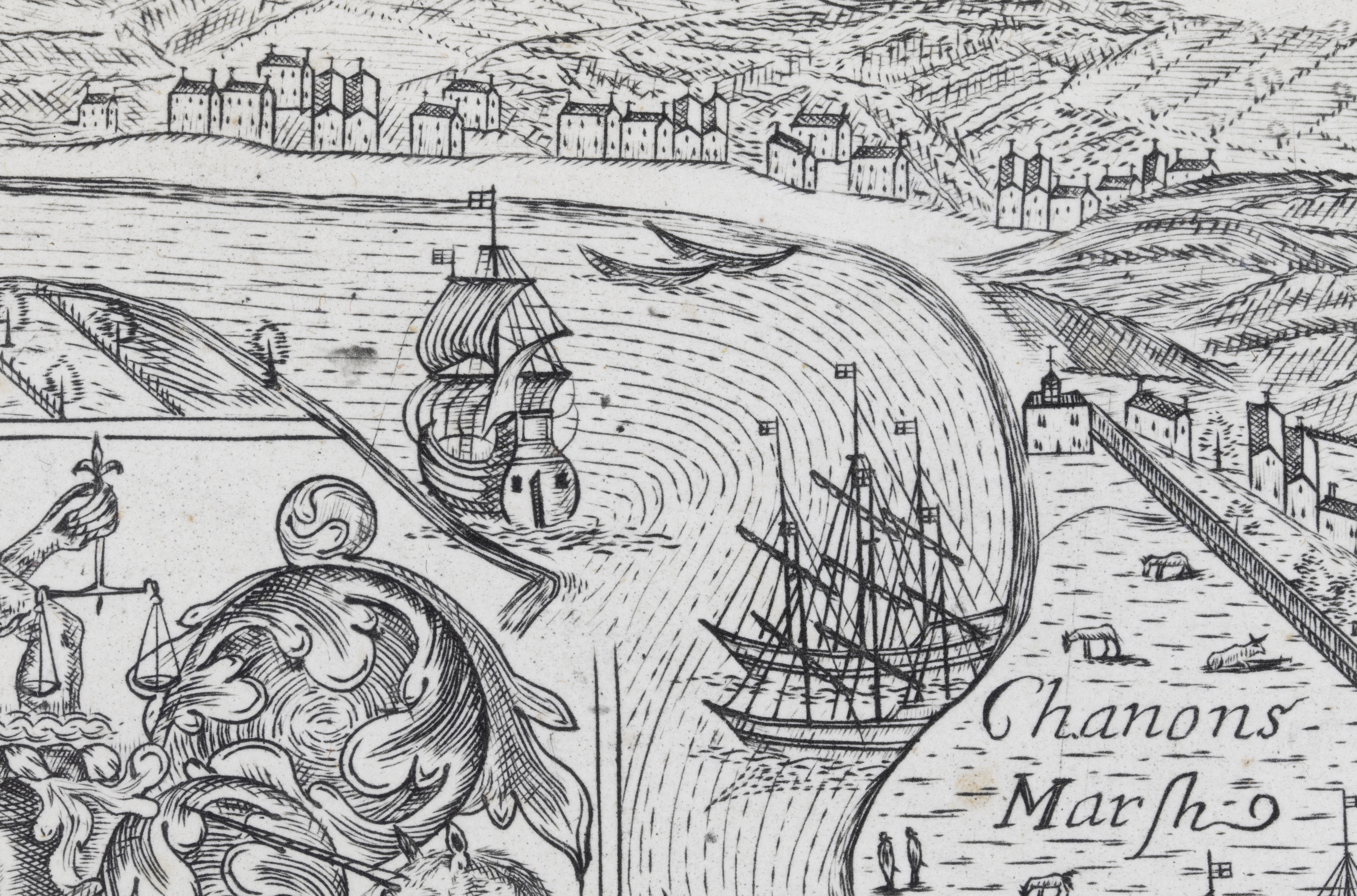
Canon's Marsh

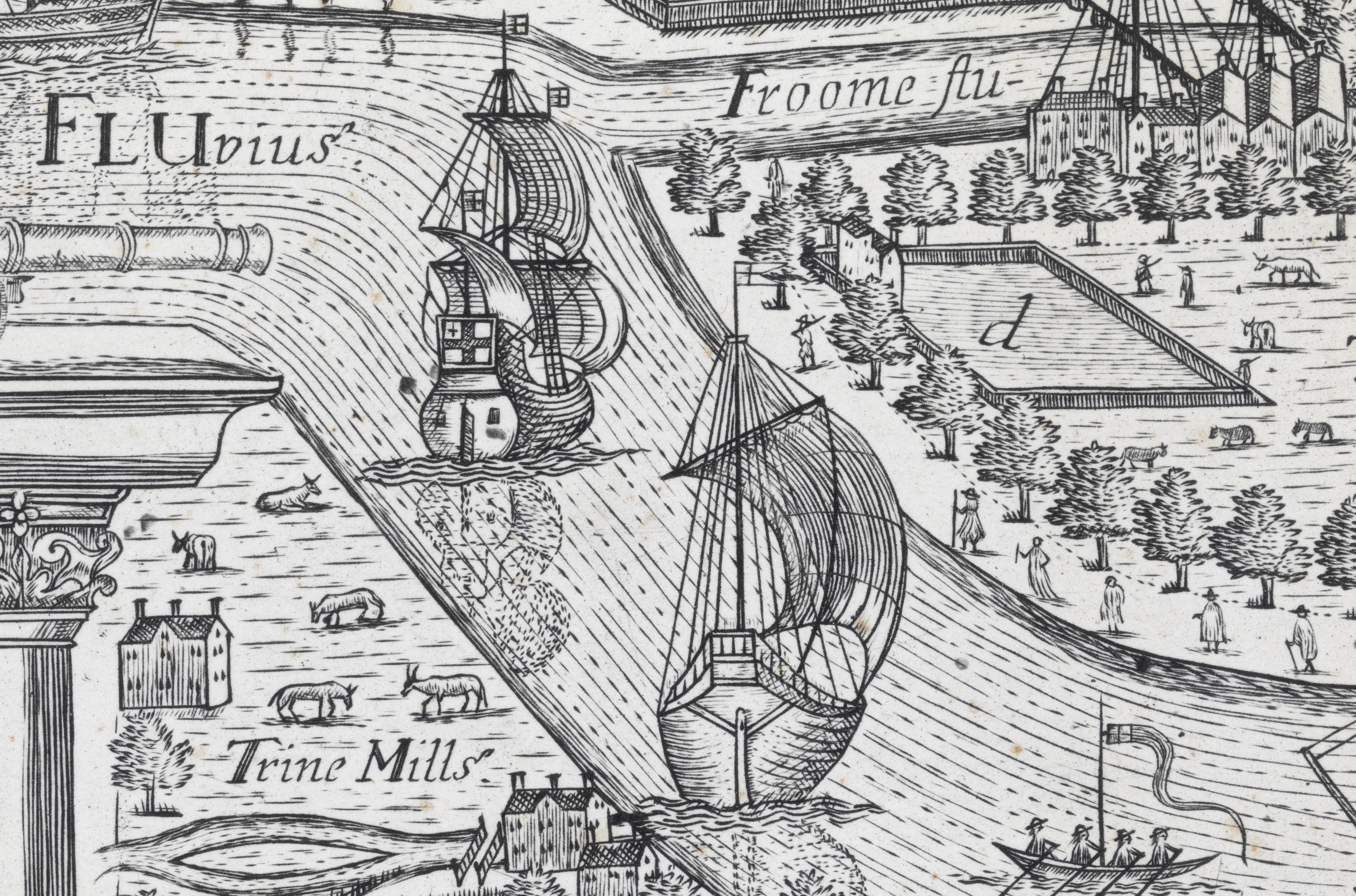
Ships in the Avon

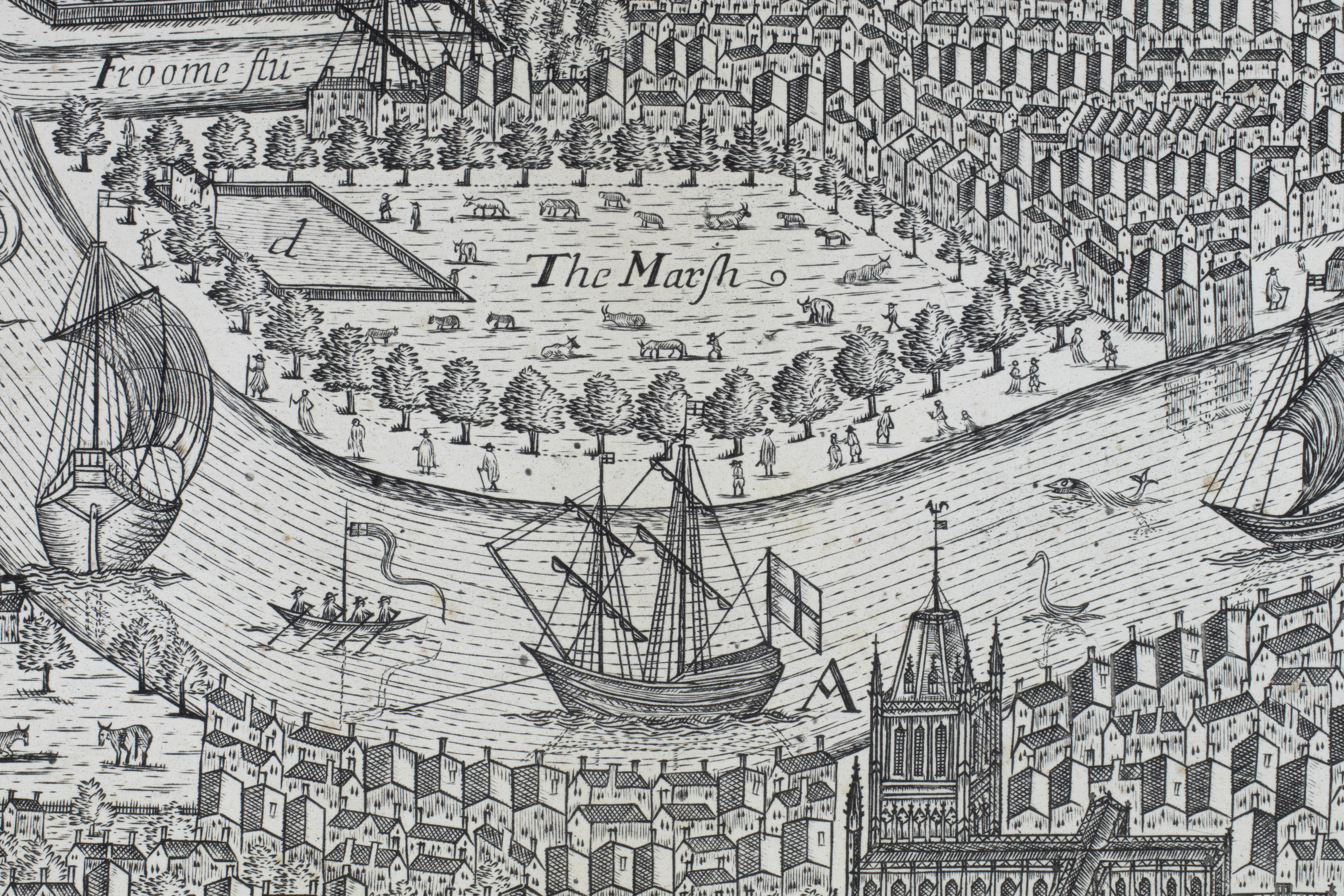
The Marsh

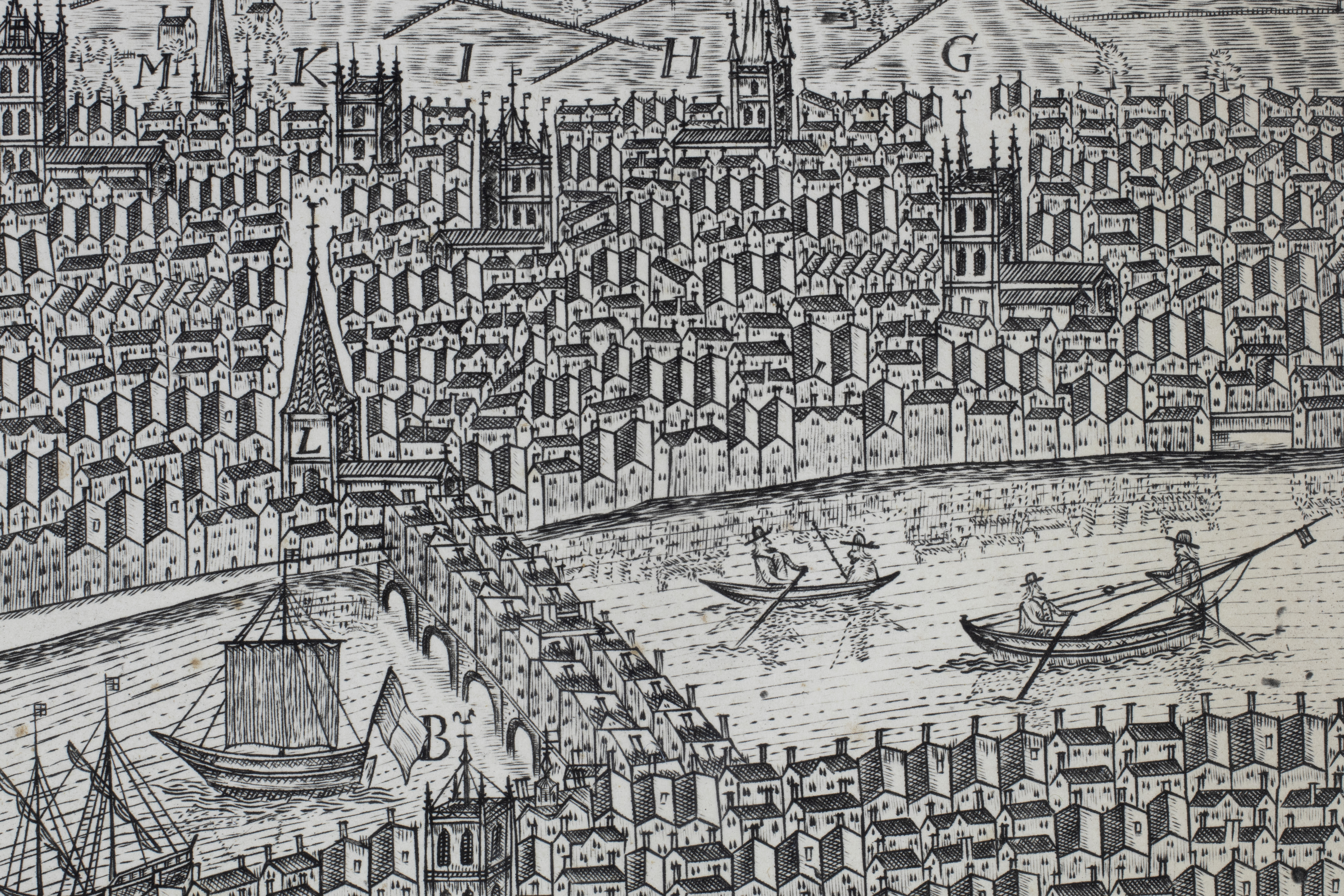
Bristol Bridge

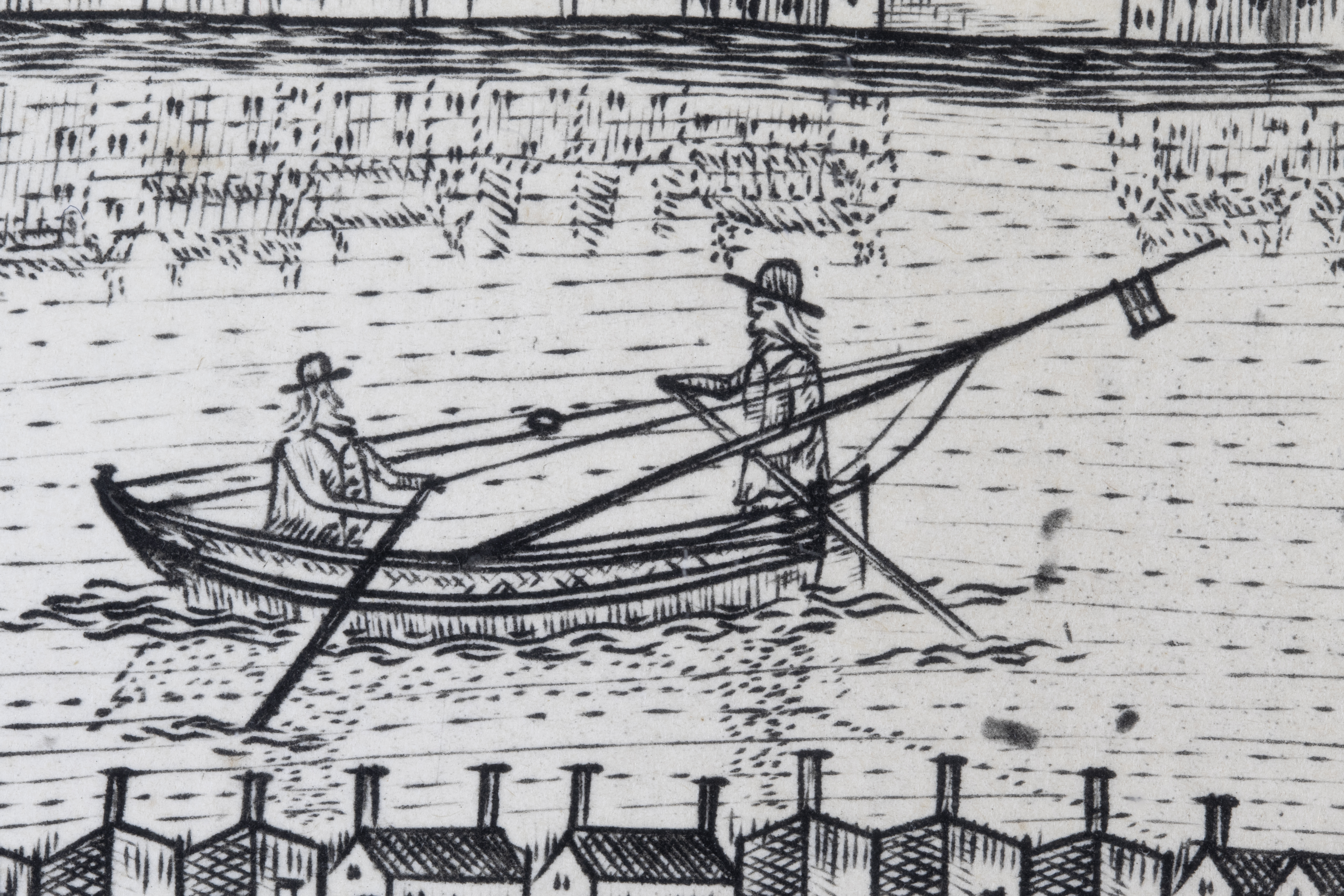
Boat with lowered mast

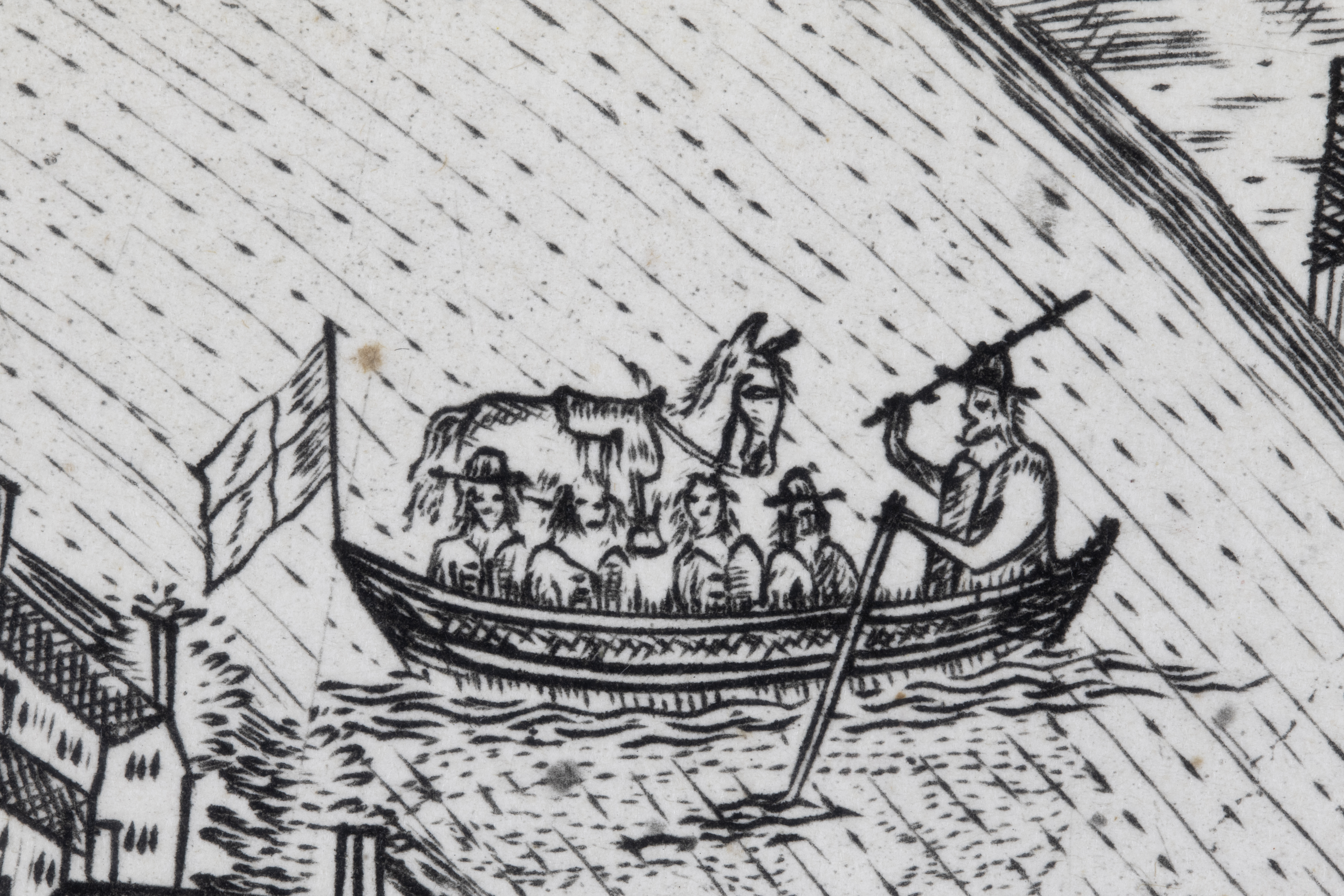
Ferry boat

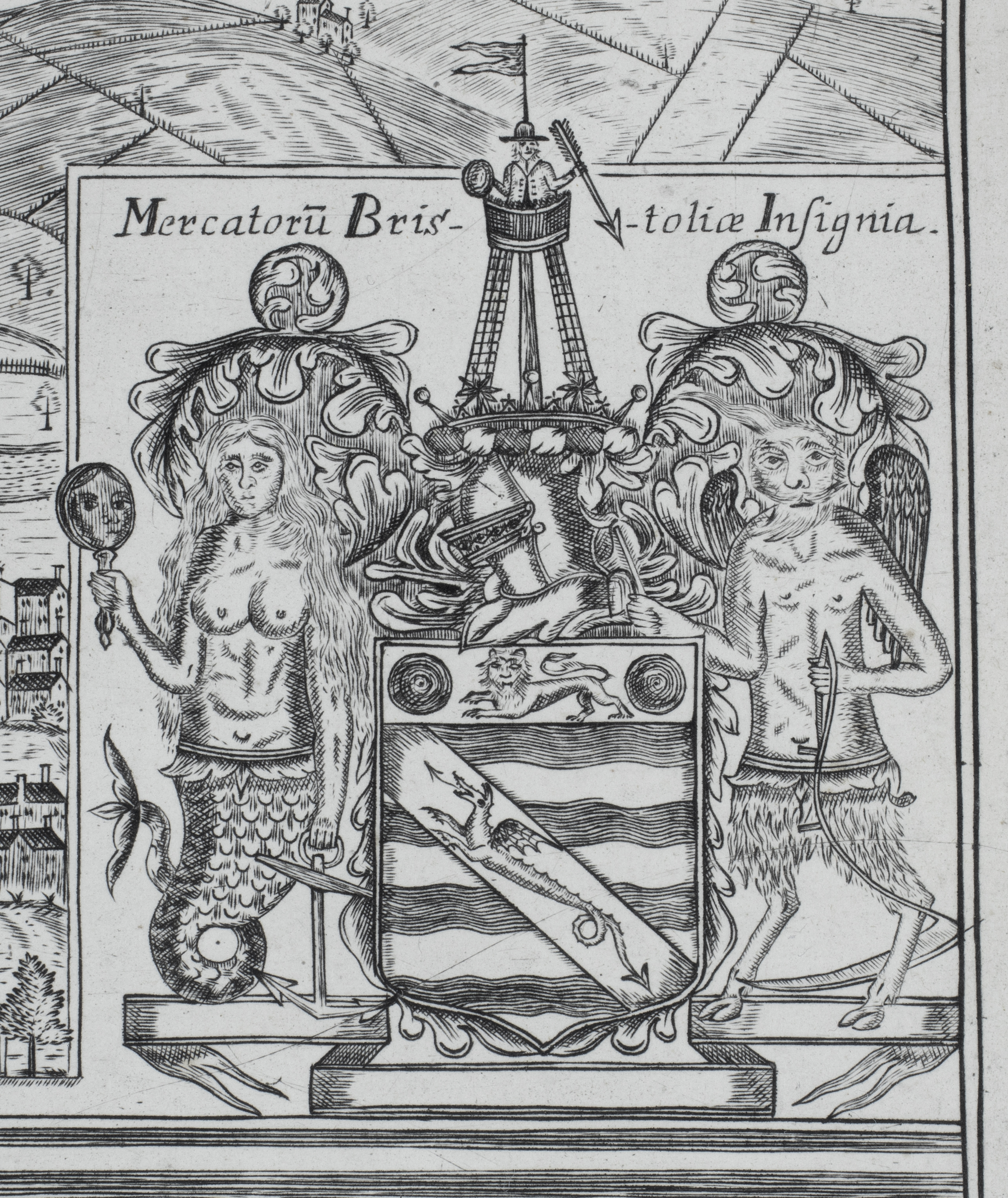
Merchant Venturers' Arms

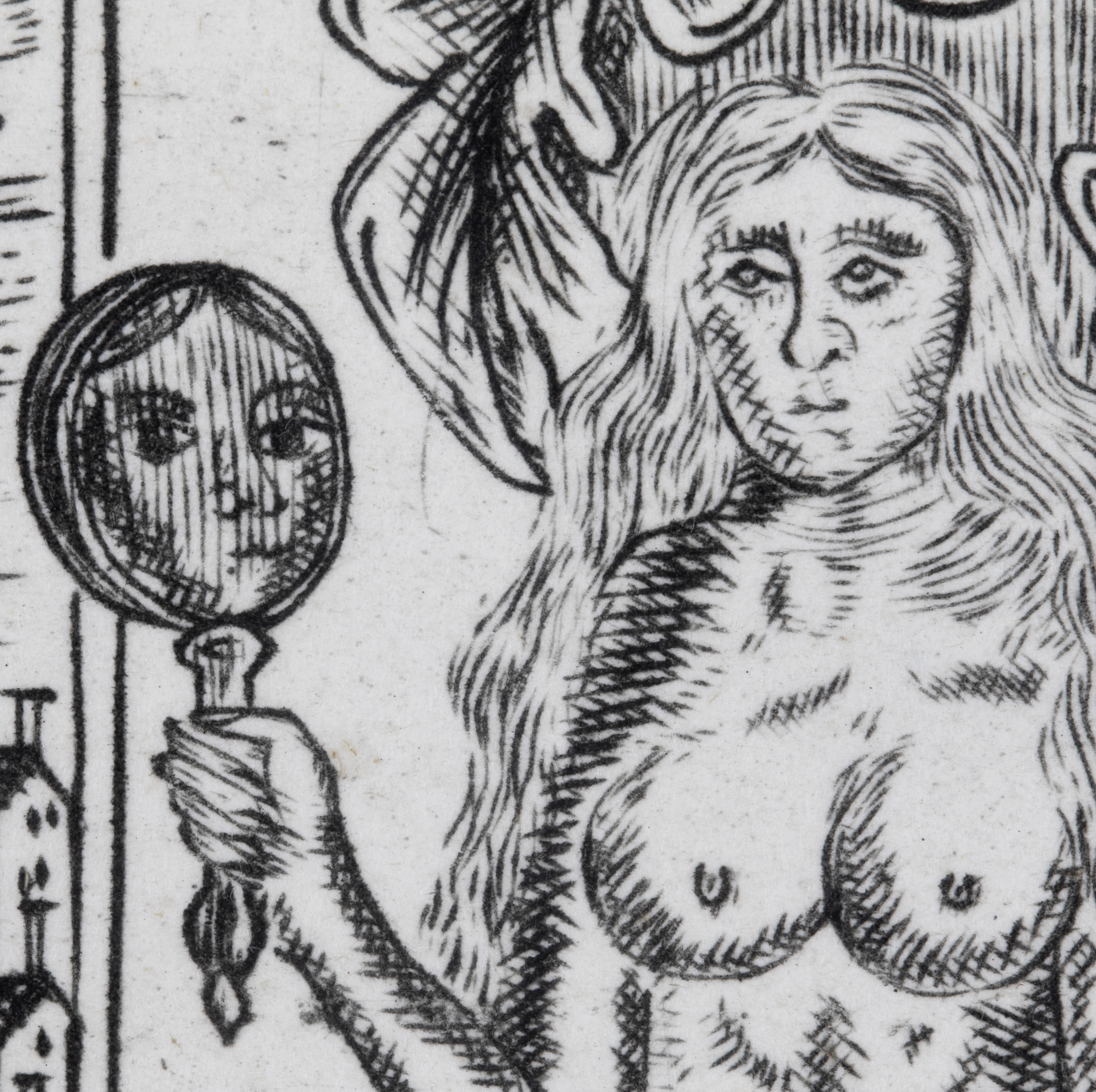
Mermaid on Merchant Venturers' arms

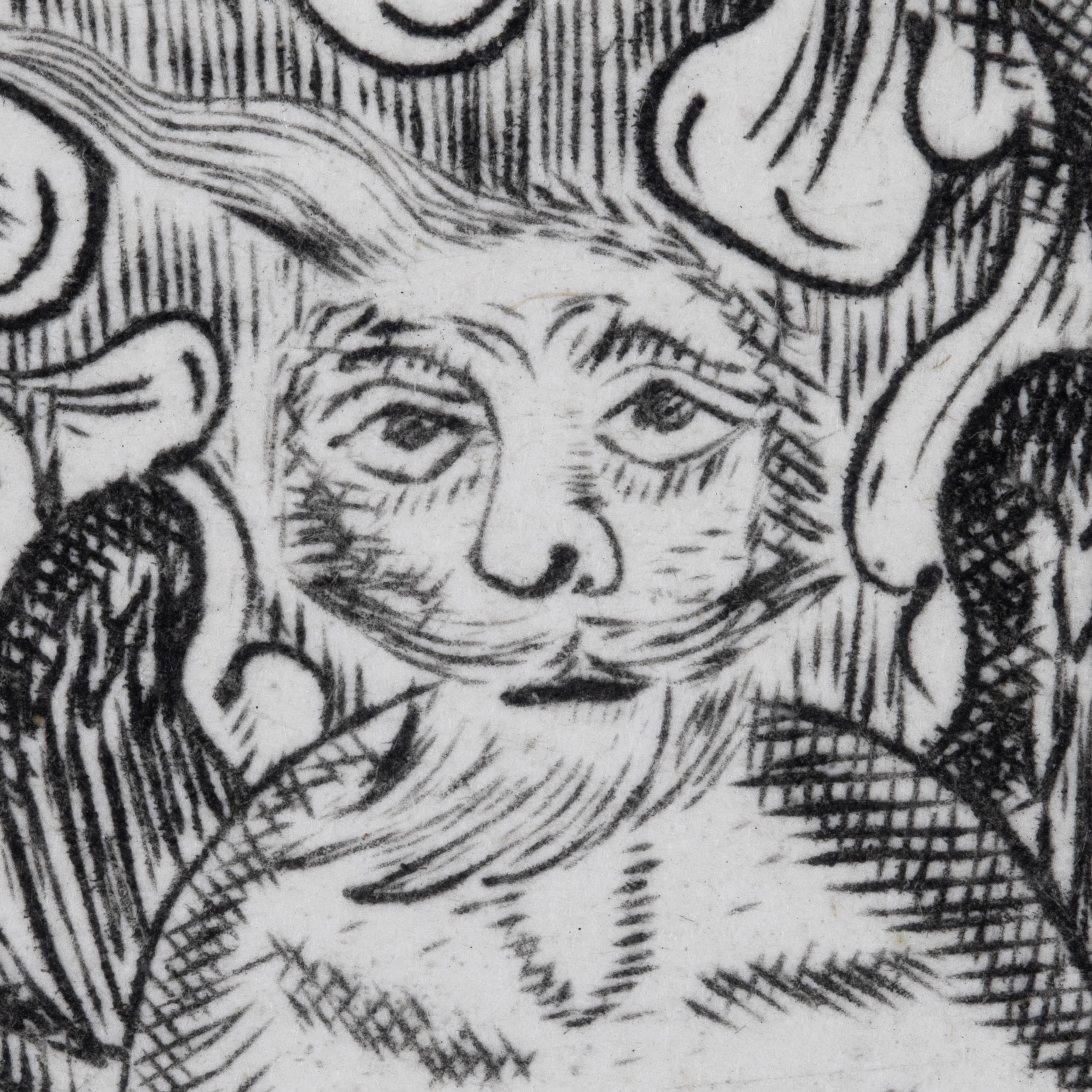
Figure of 'Time' on Merchant Venturers' arms

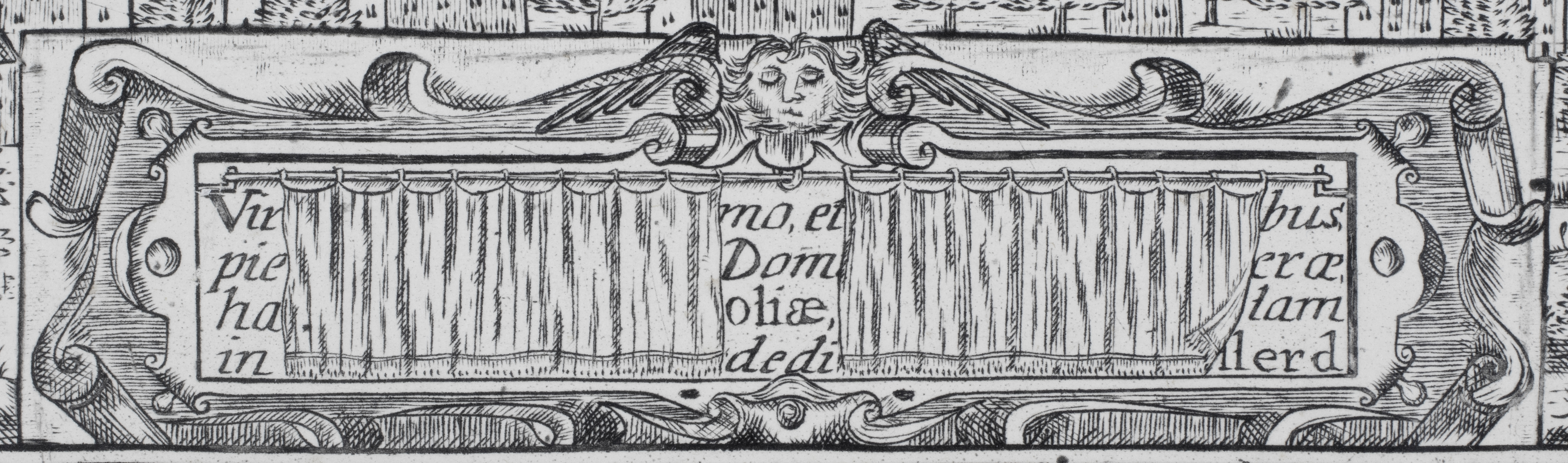
Draped dedication

High Resolution image of the core of the 1728 edition

1728 edition of map
