= Bristol riots =

Several riots in Bristol, England

The Bristol riots refer to a number of significant riots in the city of Bristol in England.

== Bristol Bridge riot, 1793 ==
In 1794 the populace of Bristol were said to be "apt to collect in mobs on the slightest occasions; but have been seldom so spirited as in the late transactions on Bristol-bridge." The Bristol Bridge Riot of 30 September 1793 began as a protest at renewal of an act levying tolls on Bristol Bridge, which included the proposal to demolish several houses near the bridge in order to create a new access road, and controversy about the date for removal of gates. Eleven people were killed and 45 injured, making it one of the worst massacres of the 18th century in England.

== New Cut riot, 1809 ==
Following the successful completion of the New Cut artificial waterway, the Bristol floating harbour project was certified as complete on 1 May 1809, and a celebratory dinner was held on Spike Island for a thousand of the navvies, navigational engineers who had worked on the construction. At the dinner "two oxen, roasted whole, a proportionate weight of potatoes, and six hundredweight of plum pudding" were served, along with a gallon of strong beer for each man. When the beer ran out a mass brawl between English and Irish labourers turned into a riot which had to be suppressed by a naval press gang.

== Queen Square riots, 1831 ==
The 3rd Dragoon Guards suppressing the 1831 Bristol riots

The Bristol Riots of 1831 took place after the House of Lords rejected the second Reform Bill, which aimed to get rid of some of the rotten boroughs and give Britain's fast growing industrial towns such as Bristol, Manchester, Birmingham, Bradford and Leeds greater representation in the House of Commons. Bristol had been represented in the House of Commons since 1295, but by 1830 only 6,000 of the 104,000 population had the vote.

Local magistrate Sir Charles Wetherell, a strong opponent of the Bill, visited Bristol to open the new Assize Courts, on 29 October. He threatened to imprison participants in a disturbance going on outside, and an angry mob chased him to the Mansion House in Queen Square. The magistrate escaped in disguise, although a contemporary history states he escaped over the rooftops, but the mayor and officials were besieged in the Mansion-house.

The rioters numbered about 500 or 600 young men and continued for three days, during which the palace of Robert Gray the Bishop of Bristol, the Mansion House, the Custom House and private homes and property were looted and destroyed, along with demolition of much of the jail. Work on the Clifton Suspension Bridge was halted and Isambard Kingdom Brunel was sworn in as a special constable.

The mayor, Charles Pinney, requested the assistance of the cavalry as a precaution and a troop of the 3rd Dragoon Guards and a squadron of the 14th Light Dragoons were sent to Bristol under the command of Lieutenant-Colonel Thomas Brereton. Brereton did not wish to incite the crowd and even ordered the squadron from the 14th out of the city after they had successfully dispersed a crowd. Seeing this as a victory, the riots continued, and eventually Brereton had to call on the 3rd and 14th to restore order and he eventually led a charge with drawn swords through the mob in Queen Square.

Four rioters were killed and 86 wounded, although many more are believed to have perished in the fires set by the rioters, with a total death toll put as high as 500. Along with the commander of the 3rd Dragoons troop, Captain Warrington, Brereton was later court-martialled for leniency, but Brereton shot himself before the conclusion of his trial. Approximately 100 of those involved were tried in January 1832 by Chief Justice Tindal. Four men were hanged despite a petition of 10,000 Bristolian signatures, which was given to King William IV. The mayor, Pinney, was tried for negligence but exonerated.

== Old Market riot, 1932 ==
On 23 February 1932, in reaction to the government reducing unemployment benefit by 10 per cent, around 4,000 protestors tried to march down to the city centre, led by the National Unemployed Workers Movement. Throughout the protest, police showed heavy resistance, drawing their batons and deploying mounted police on horseback, which caused retaliation from protestors. This behaviour climaxed with the police baton-charging protesters outside Trinity police station and along Old Market. Many people, including bystanders, were injured. Gradually over the next five years, unemployment in Bristol reduced and by 1937 just 11,500 people were registered unemployed in the city, contrasted to the 28,000 or so that were registered as unemployed at the time of the riot.

== Park Street riot 1944 ==
The Park Street riot occurred in Park Street and George Street on 15 July 1944. Racial tensions inflamed by earlier incidents, and the racial segregation of GIs both in the UK and abroad, came to a head in Bristol when a large number of black GIs refused to come back to their camps after US Military Police came to end a minor fracas. More MPs were sent, up to 120 policemen, and Park Street was closed off with buses. In subsequent confrontation, an MP was stabbed, a black GI was shot dead, and several others were wounded.

== St Pauls riot, 1980 ==
The St Pauls riot started on 2 April 1980 in the St Pauls district, as a consequence of racial tensions between Black members of the community and the police, including concerns over sus laws, poor housing and alienation of Black youth. When 20 police officers carried out a raid on the Black and White Café located on Grosvenor Road in the heart of St Pauls, they faced resistance, which escalated into a riot. The riot continued for many hours and caused large amounts of damage including a Lloyds Bank and post office, several fire engines and twelve police cars. Thirty-three people were injured, including 21 policemen and three firemen, and 21 arrests were made, but no one was ever convicted of any crime.

== St Paul's riot, 1986 ==
Clashes with police also occurred in the same area during 1980 and 1986, as the issues that had led to the riot some 6 years previously hung in the air. On 7 May 1986, "Avon and Somerset Police organized a large raid in the St Paul's district of Bristol. Almost exactly one year after the 1985 Handsworth riots, 600 police moved into the area to search premises in connection with drugs and drinking offences. The reaction was serious rioting and attacks on police". On the final day of the clash, 9 May, "2 cops are injured when their patrol car is attacked by stones and other missiles in the third day of disturbances." In 1996 The Independent published an article stating "Inner-city area struggles to lose violent image", but by 2017 not only was the city of Bristol named best place to live in the whole of the UK in March by The Sunday Times, but St Paul's itself was dubbed fifth 'coolest' place to live by The Times the same month.

== Hartcliffe, 1992 ==
On 16 July 1992 a riot occurred on the Hartcliffe estate after Shaun Star and his friend were killed by police on a stolen unmarked police motorbike the two men had previously stolen from the local area. Both men got knocked off and killed by a police patrol car after being chased around the estate. The two deceased men were well known within the community, while the officers involved were not trained in safe pursuit, and had not followed procedures. Tensions were already high between the authorities and community as a result of distrust of the police and issues with deprivation in the area, and they were compounded during the disturbance by the breaking news that Hartcliffe had been denied funding from the government's City Challenge Initiative for the second year running. In total the disturbance lasted for 3 days. Police were attacked and many of the already rundown shops in the Symes Avenue shopping centre were torched, smashed up and damaged. Around 80 or so arrests led to more than 60 people charged and taken through the courts, and the policeman who had swerved his car into the path of the motorbike, was found guilty of causing the two deaths by dangerous driving.

== Stokes Croft (Tesco Metro, Telepathic Heights), April 2011 ==
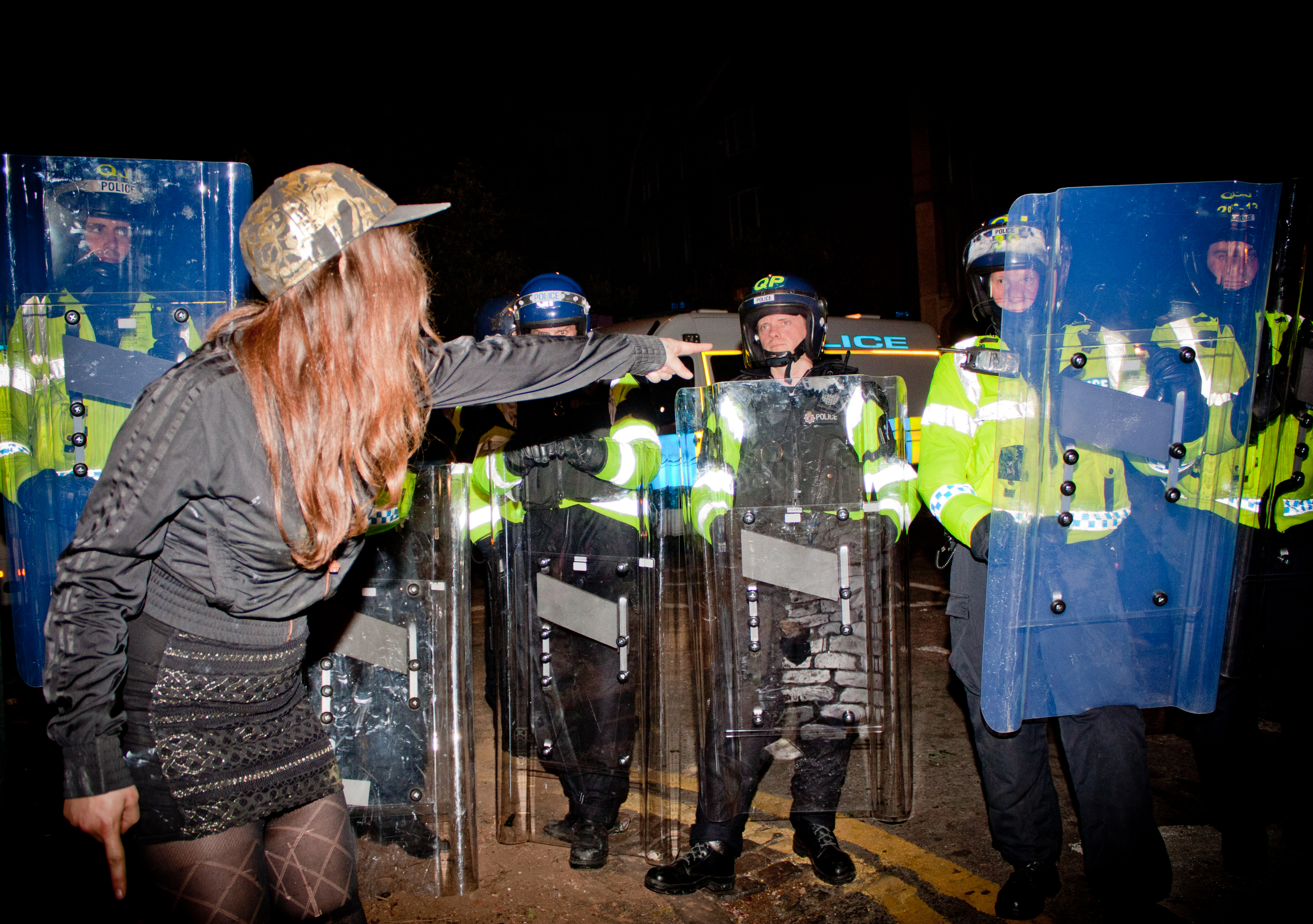
Riot police block off Stokes Croft on the night of 21 April 2011 following the raid of the nearby squat

A riot began in front of a new Tesco Metro at the southern end of Cheltenham Road on 21 April 2011. Allegedly in protest at the opening of a new Tesco Metro, the riot began when police raided a squat, known as Telepathic Heights, opposite the store. Skips and bins were set alight, bottles thrown, and running battles occurred between police and protestors up and down the street until the early hours of the morning.

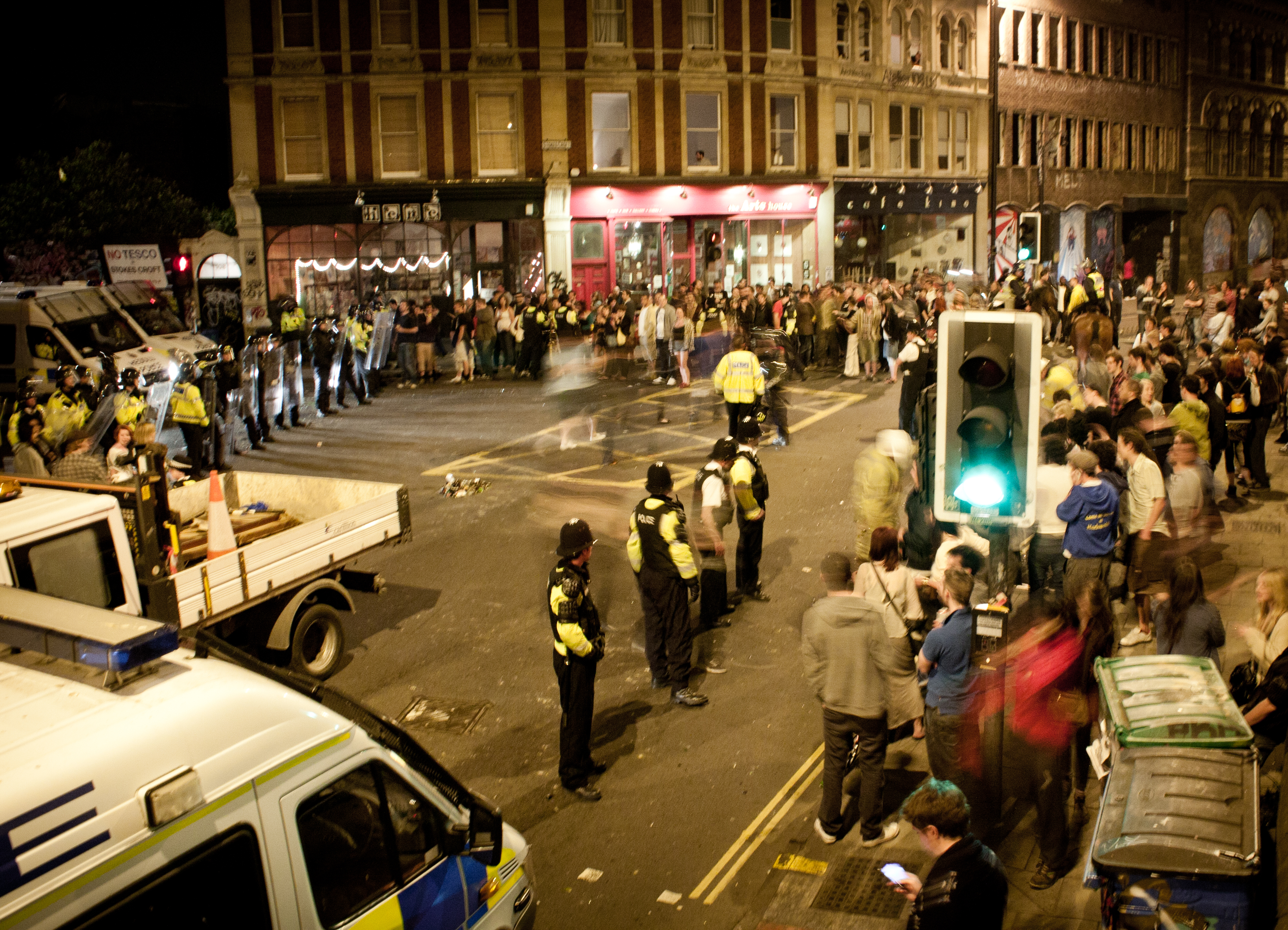
Riots were concentrated around Cheltenham Road and Stokes Croft, where police had formed a barricade

== National riots, August 2011 ==
Protests had started in Tottenham, London, following the shooting of Mark Duggan, a local man who was shot dead by police on 4 August. In the early hours of the morning on Tuesday 9 August, it was reported that vandalism and looting occurred in Bristol in response to similar occurring elsewhere in the country.

== Kill the Bill protest, March 2021 ==
A riot began outside Bridewell police station, in the centre of the city, on Sunday 21 March 2021 as the culmination of a protest against what became the Police, Crime, Sentencing and Courts Act 2022. Police vans were set on fire, including one containing officers. Initial reports from police stated that officers had suffered broken bones, but these statements proved to be false. Further protests occurred on 23 and 26 March, turning violent as police moved to disband the protestors.

== See also ==
- Peterloo Massacre
- Urban riots
