= 1831 Bristol riots =

Part of the 1831 reform riots in England

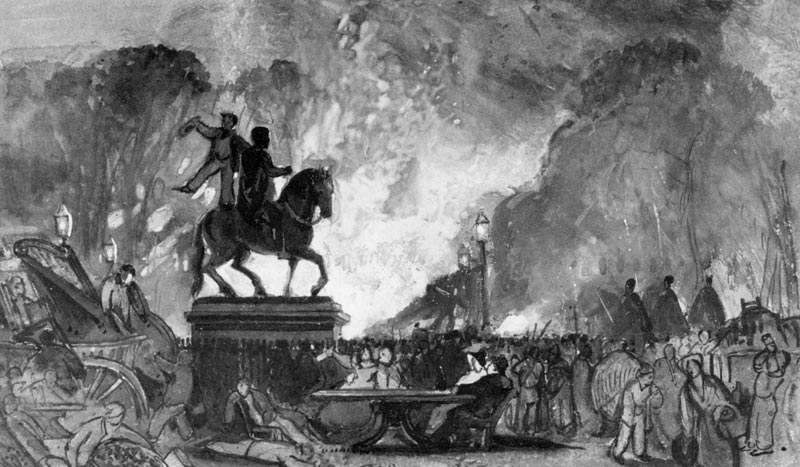
Queen Square on the Night of 30 October 1831, a contemporary depiction of the riots

The 3rd Dragoon Guards charging at rioters in Queen Square on 31 October

Riots took place in Bristol from 29 to 31 October 1831 and were part of the 1831 reform riots in England. The riots arose after the second Reform Bill was voted down in the House of Lords, stalling efforts at electoral reform. The arrival of the anti-reform judge Charles Wetherell in the city on 29 October led to a protest, which degenerated into a riot. The civic and military authorities were poorly focused and uncoordinated and lost control of the city. Order was restored on the third day by a combination of a posse comitatus of the city's middle-class citizens and military forces.

Much of the city centre was burnt, with up to £300,000 of damage caused and up to 250 casualties incurred. The city's mayor Charles Pinney was tried for failing to prevent the riot and acquitted. Lieutenant-Colonel Thomas Brereton, the military commander, was court-martialled on a similar charge but died of suicide before his trial was concluded. A renewed third reform bill passed in 1832, as the Great Reform Act, introducing sweeping changes to the electoral system. Local government in Bristol was likewise reformed with the passing of the Municipal Corporations Act 1835.

== Background ==
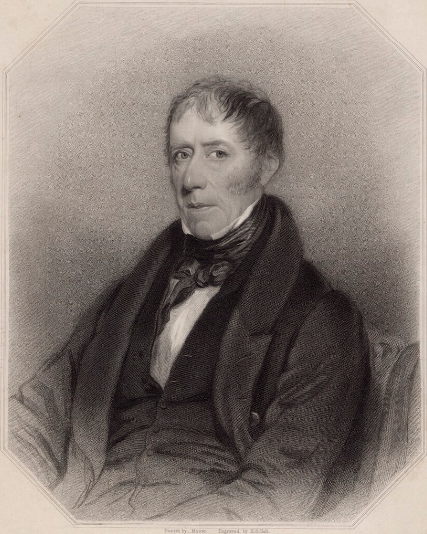
Charles Wetherell

In early 19th-century Britain there were large discrepancies in the size of constituencies of the lower house, the House of Commons. Some seats, so called rotten boroughs, returned up to two Members of Parliament (MPs) from a small number of electors, while new urban centres, such as Manchester, had no MPs.

In March 1831 an attempt was made by the Whigs to introduce a Reform Bill to address the matter. This was defeated in parliament and the prime minister, Earl Grey, resigned. Grey was returned to office with a majority in the subsequent general election and introduced a second Reform Bill. This passed in the House of Commons but was defeated in the Lords on 8 October 1831. Bristol, a city of 100,000 people, was represented by just two members of parliament.

The rejection of the bill and the second resignation of Grey resulted in a period of political upheaval which has since been characterised as "the closest that Britain came to revolution". Inhabitants of cities and towns were angry at the failure to pass the bill and there were serious disturbances in London, Derby, Leicester, Yeovil, Sherborne, Exeter, Bath, Worcester and Bristol. The disturbances in Birmingham were so severe that the British Army's Scots Greys cavalry regiment was deployed to the city. Full scale riots erupted in Bristol, Nottingham and Derby.

The Bristol Recorder (senior judge) Charles Wetherell was a noted opponent of the Reform Bill. Although he was given a hero's welcome in the city in 1829 for his opposition to Catholic emancipation, he sparked controversy in 1830 for stating in parliament that the people of Bristol opposed reform. The city had, in fact, sent a petition of 17,000 names to support reform and hosted large pro-reform public meetings in the first week of October. Wetherell himself was MP for the Yorkshire rotten borough of Boroughbridge. Boroughbridge, with just 48 electors, was set to be abolished by the Reform Bill. Wetherell was due to attend the court of assizes in Bristol at the end of October.

== Preceding days ==
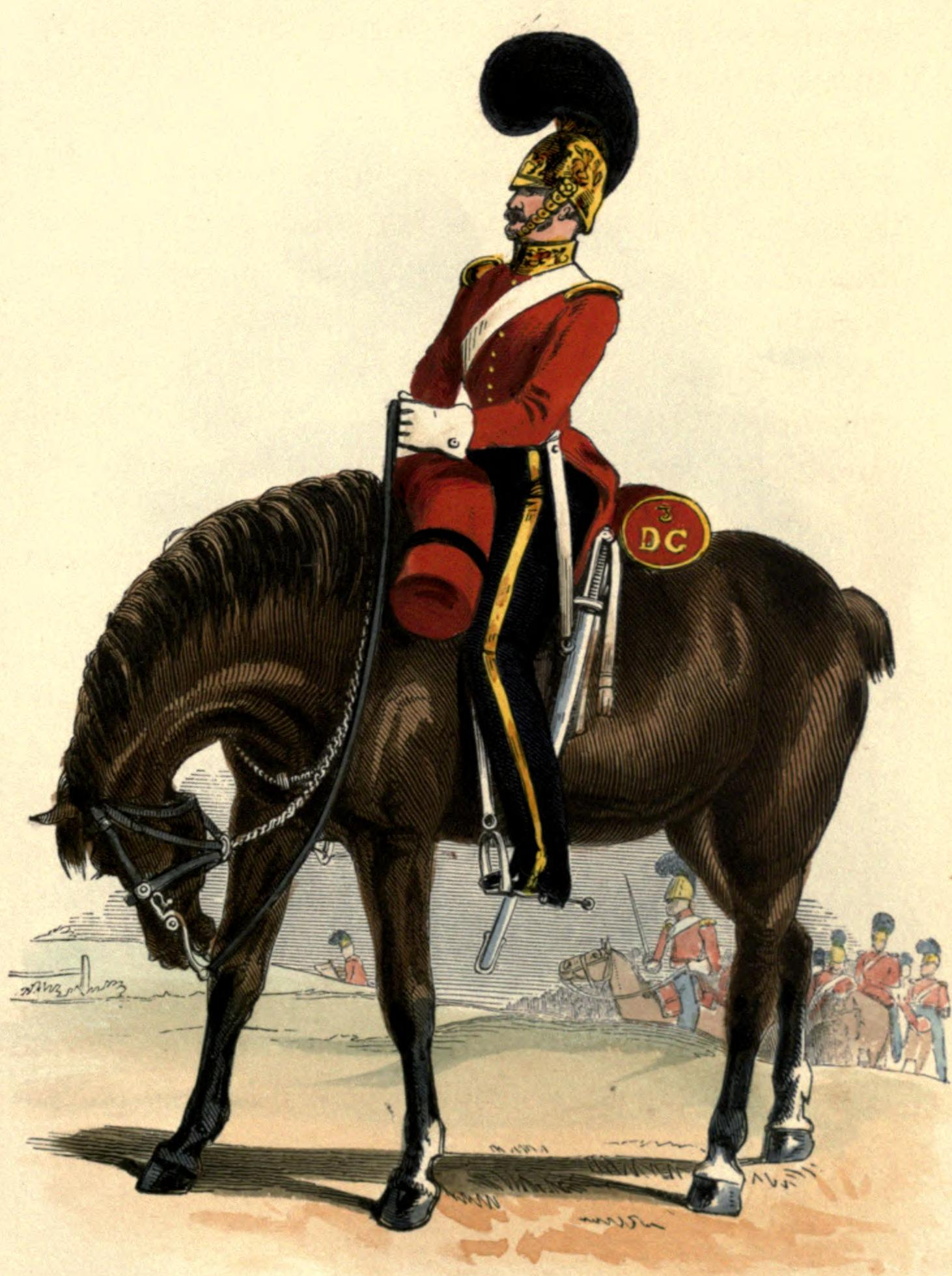
A soldier of the 3rd Dragoon Guards

The Mayor of Bristol and head of its local authority, the Bristol Corporation, was Charles Pinney, a Whig and a supporter of the Reform Bill. His election, in September, may have been arranged by the other aldermen of the city, who were mainly anti-reform Tories, to curry favour with pro-reform elements and to reduce the likelihood of unrest. Pinney, by virtue of his office, was responsible for leading the response of the civil authorities to the riots. The citizens were angered as they regarded Pinney, who had not publicly supported electoral reform since taking office, as having abandoned the cause to join the Establishment.

The Bristol Political Union (BPU), under William Herapath, was a key organisation in the city supporting reform. On 18 October the BPU broke up a meeting of sailors who were discussing forming a bodyguard for Wetherell's arrival. On 24 October a riot was narrowly averted when pro-reform citizens protested the arrival of George Henry Law, Bishop of Bath and Wells for the consecration of a new church in Bedminster. Law had voted against the Reform Bill in the House of Lords (from 22 present Lords Spiritual 21 voted against the bill).

The BPU met with the city magistrates in October and agreed to maintain neutrality during any civil disturbance, provided that troops were not used. Herapath called off the agreement on 25 October, when he learnt that the magistrates had requested troops be sent to the city. Herapath later stated that he was confident that he could have maintained order in the city, had the troops not been deployed.

The Bristol under-sheriff had command of only 100 constables and estimated that at least 300 would be required to deal with the anticipated size of the protests against Wetherell. Herapath refused to allow BPU members to be enlisted as special constables and there were few volunteers from the middle class who were traditionally called upon to provide this service. The magistrates managed to enlist 119 volunteers, but many of these were of known violent tendencies. Despite having the power to do so the magistrates did not order the yeomanry or half-pay and retired army personnel to be called up. They did, however, clear weapons from the city's gun smiths in case of looting.

The city magistrates requested British Army troops be sent to help with any disorder. The government was reluctant to send any, knowing that it would be unpopular with the public, but eventually the Home Secretary William Lamb, 2nd Viscount Melbourne authorised the deployment of a force of 93 soldiers to be only used in the case of an "absolute emergency". These were a mix of men from the 14th Light Dragoons and the 3rd Dragoon Guards. The 14th were unpopular in Bristol as they had recently been involved in the suppression of disorder in the West Country, where they had earned the nickname the "Bloody Blues".

During the course of the riots men of this regiment, recognisable in their distinctive blue uniforms, would be jeered by the crowd while those of the 3rd, a regiment based locally, were cheered. Lieutenant-Colonel Thomas Brereton was inspecting field officer for the Bristol recruiting district and led the military response to the riots. He was a supporter of reform and, after the riots, would be accused of having sympathies with the mob.

When the troops arrived in the city the aldermen and magistrates refused to ride at the head of the troops as they crossed the city boundary, as tradition demanded. The officials were fearful that doing so would cause the mob to single out their businesses for looting and arson.

== 29 October ==
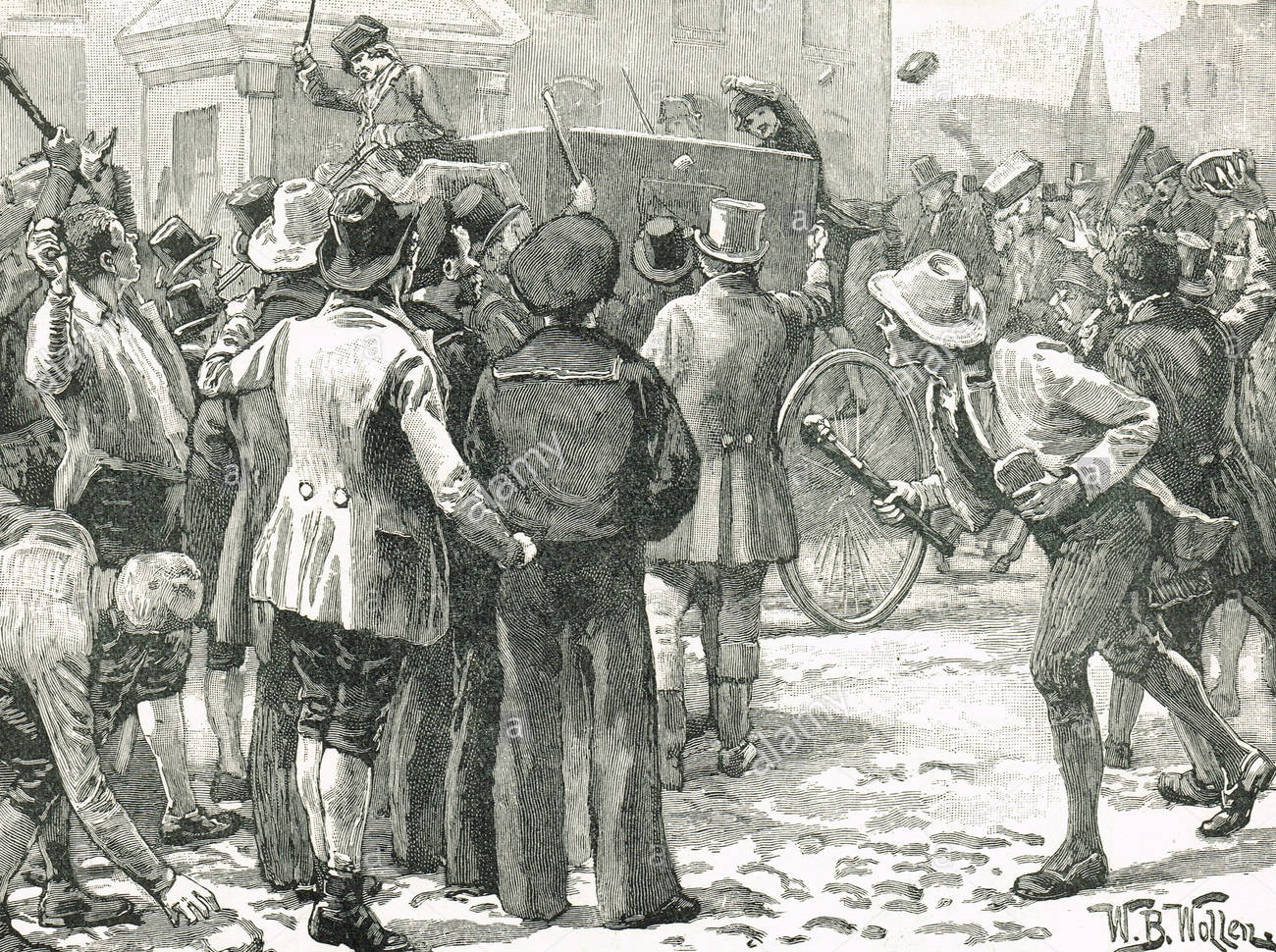
A 1901 depiction of the attack on Sir Charles Wetherell

The location of Wetherell's entrance into the city had been changed for security reasons but soon became common knowledge and he was met with a mob upon his arrival on 29 October. The carriage carrying Wetherell and Pinney was stoned and they sought refuge at the corporation's Mansion House. Violence escalated, particularly after the special constables carried out a number of charges into the crowd, one of which led to the death of a member of the public. There were disputes between the dragoons and the constables over the perceived heavy-handedness of the latter. Pinney twice spoke to the crowd to attempt to regain control, but felt he had no option but to read the Riot Act at dusk, by which time many of the special constables had abandoned their posts.

The rioting continued into the night and the Mansion House was stormed, the 14th Light Dragoons attempted to halt the riot and shot one man dead whilst doing so. Wetherell fled the Mansion House via the rooftop to an adjacent building and Pinney escaped to seek refuge at a friend's house where he spent much of the following day.

== 30 October ==
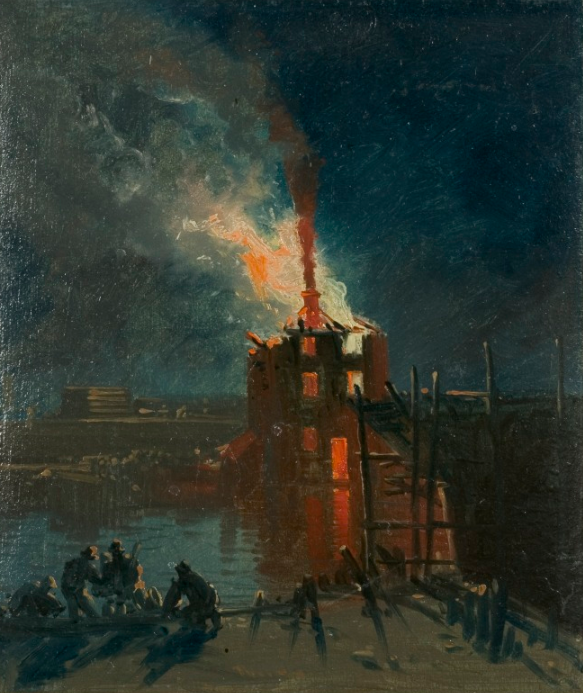
A contemporary depiction of a warehouse set ablaze during the riot

The looting of the Mansion House continued from 7 am on 30 October, a Sunday. Its wine cellar was emptied and the building set on fire. Efforts to control the riot were hampered by a crowd of middle-class onlookers, who encouraged the rioters. Pinney ordered a notice to be read out in the city's places of worship that morning that ordered a posse comitatus to be formed. However, fewer than 200 men answered the call and these mostly dispersed when the civic authorities failed to organise them effectively. Part of the problem was that the civic authorities moved their headquarters between a number of different buildings. This meant that their leaders were hard to locate at key times, for example on 30 October a force of 57 men from the Dodington yeomanry arrived in the city but were withdrawn by their officer when no magistrate could be found to requisition lodgings. Herapath spoke to the mob but failed to halt the violence. He later offered to mobilise the BPU members as a peacekeeping force but was refused by Pinney who thought it would reflect badly upon the authorities.

There was mistrust between the civic and military leaders and confusion over what actions to take. Pinney's orders to Brereton were vague and did not explicitly authorise the use of deadly force; at one point Brereton had to dissuade Pinney from issuing direct orders to fire into the crowd. Brereton had never served in a public order role before and behaved indecisively, he consistently overestimated the size of the rioting crowd and underestimated his ability to control it. Brereton may have been affected by the criticism the armed forces received for its actions in Manchester in 1819, in which 18 people were killed when cavalry charged a crowd in the Peterloo Massacre.

A charge by the 14th Dragoons in Corn Street against a mob attacking the Council House resulted in the deaths of two men. Brereton believed an element in the 14th were provoking trouble with the crowd and, assured by the mob that they would disperse if the "Bloody Blues" were sent away, ordered them to withdraw. There was a short lull in the fighting, during which Wetherell escaped from the city disguised as a woman, but the mob afterwards attacked the town jails. The few soldiers of the 3rd Dragoon Guards left on the scene were powerless to stop them; the Bridewell Jail, Lawford's Gate Prison (Gloucester County Prison) and the New Gaol were overrun and the prisoners freed.

Further destruction was inflicted upon houses, warehouses, tollhouses and civic buildings, particularly on Queen Square, Prince's Street and King Street. There was an attempt to attack the Bristol Corporation's dock company and the dock gates were burnt. Fires set at the Bishop's Palace, the Custom House, the excise office and at other buildings were reportedly visible from Newport, Wales. Chants from the crowd included "Oh! It's only Corporation property!" to justify the destruction of civic buildings and "Down with the churches and mend the roads with them". It is known that a number of "fireballs" of flammable tow and pitch were manufactured for use by rioters; though otherwise they were armed only with improvised sticks, railings, and tools looted from blacksmiths.

The arrival of military reinforcements further strained the city’s resources, and a detachment sent from Cardiff found the city centre in such disarray that no standard accommodation was available. After initially seeking shelter in the Guildhall and the White Lion on Broad Street, the troops were relocated outside the centre. In November 1831, the Bristol Corporation of the Poor offered the use of the former Georgian armoury in Easton, then in the process of being converted into a poorhouse, to the civic authorities. The military began renting the facility as a temporary barracks on 21 December 1831, which eventually led to the abandonment of the poorhouse scheme and instead development of the terraces of Armoury Square.

== 31 October ==
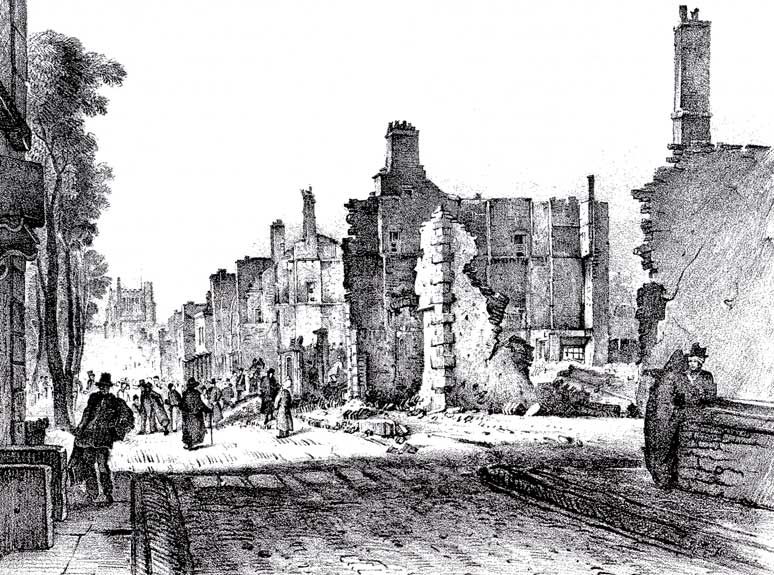
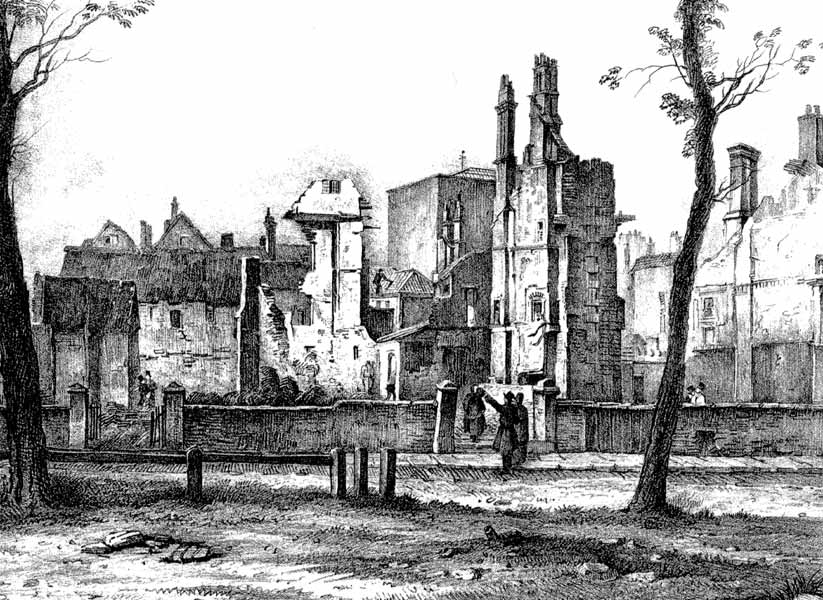
Contemporary sketches of Queen Square after the riots

The destruction caused during the night of 30/31 October, in which many private houses were attacked, shocked the citizens of the city. The middle classes were provoked into action and some 3,000 men reported for duty in the posse comitatus on the following morning. An additional 100 soldiers from the 14th Light Dragoons arrived in the city later that day. Their officer, Major Beckwith, and a War Office liaison officer, Major Mackworth, took control of the situation, without regard for Brereton's seniority. They responded to a rush of rioters on the southern side of Queen Square with a charge by the 3rd Dragoon Guards that effectively quelled the riot. The posse comitatus had largely restored order across the city by the time General Sir Richard Downes Jackson arrived from London with several hundred soldiers to do so.

== Aftermath ==
The riots were the worst in an English city since the 1780 Gordon Riots in London. The total death toll is unknown but 12 citizens are known to have been killed in clashes with the authorities; many other corpses were recovered later from within burned buildings. Historian Mark Harrison in 1988 estimated between 120 and 250 casualties from all parties. A large part of the city centre was destroyed and up to £300,000 of damage caused (equivalent to over £28 million in 2026 prices).

Bristol was governed by Jackson and his troops for four months. Many in Parliament had no confidence in the local government under Pinney and set up a committee of enquiry to remove the Bristol magistrates from office, opposed by Melbourne, who claimed he lacked jurisdiction. Pinney was eventually brought to trial before the Court of King's Bench in October 1832 and acquitted.

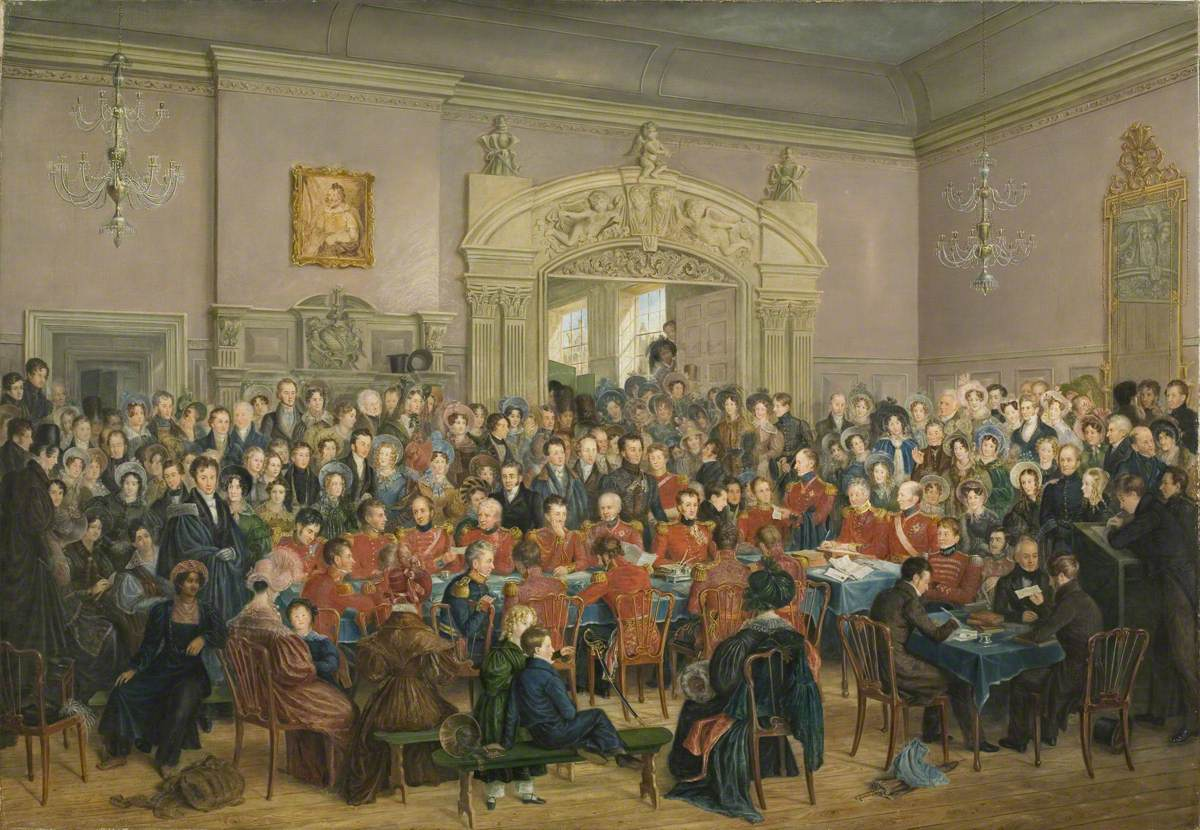
A contemporary depiction of the court-martial of Colonel Brereton

Trials of the rioters were held in January 1832, 102 were tried and 31 were sentenced to death. One of the men sentenced to hang was a retired tradesman whose only crime was to shout encouragement to the rioters. He was singled out by the court for particular punishment because of the respectable position he held in society. Clemency was granted to all bar four of those sentenced to death after a petition of 10,000 names was presented, which included the names of people whose houses had been destroyed in the riot. Some 22 people were transported to Australia and 43 imprisoned. Captain Warrington of the 3rd Dragoon Guards was court-martialled and cashiered for failing to pass on a message to Brereton during the riot. The colonel himself was arraigned before a court-martial in January 1832. During the proceedings he offered to plead guilty to charges of failing to control the riot if the court agreed not to call any more witnesses. The court refused this request and Brereton killed himself before his trial was concluded.

Both pro-reform and anti-reform activists blamed the other for the riots. Pro-reformers suspected the Tory aldermen of Bristol of wanting the riots to get out of hand to discredit the movement while the Tories blamed the Whig government of withholding troops from the city authorities. It was alleged that the riots were directed by an external party; allegations were made of French involvement (revolutionaries there had overthrown Charles X in July 1830) and of members of the Birmingham Political Union travelling to the city, but not substantiated. Reform campaigners, eager to avoid any political connection to the riot, claimed the rioters were all youths, the unemployed and "women of abandoned character" from St Philips and Lawford's Gate areas of the city. However court records show the rioters seem to have largely been men aged 20–40 from the Temple and St James districts. Only one of those convicted of rioting was unemployed, for example.

Another common misconception of the time was that troublemakers had come from the Kingswood collieries; though the pit owners stated that their men had largely remained at work throughout the riots. No defendant claimed a political motive in court and many pleaded drunkenness as mitigation for their behaviour.

The Third Reform Bill, known afterwards as the Great Reform Act, finally passed in 1832 after a political crisis known as the Days of May. The Royal Commission on Municipal Corporations of 1833 thought Bristol's local authority was jealous of its power and incapable of controlling the city; with many city officials viewing their positions as sinecures. The corporation was reformed by the Municipal Corporations Act 1835. Pinney returned to the corporation that year as an alderman, a position he held for 18 years, Wetherell lost his Boroughbridge seat as one of the rotten boroughs abolished by the Reform Act and did not sit in parliament again.

Beyond the immediate physical destruction, the riots imposed a severe financial burden on the city, which was forced to raise an additional £10,000 per year to fund reconstruction and compensation efforts. This strain led to the immediate postponement and eventual abandonment of several civic improvement projects, including the plans to convert the Easton Armoury into a poorhouse. The Bristol Corporation of the Poor instead pivoted to purchasing the old Admiralty prison at Stapleton as it became more cost-effective as a result.

== W. J. Müller's 1831 depictions of the riots ==
The artist William James Müller, an artist of the Bristol School, witnessed the rioting and recorded some of the scenes in a series of "raw and brilliant oil and watercolour sketches".

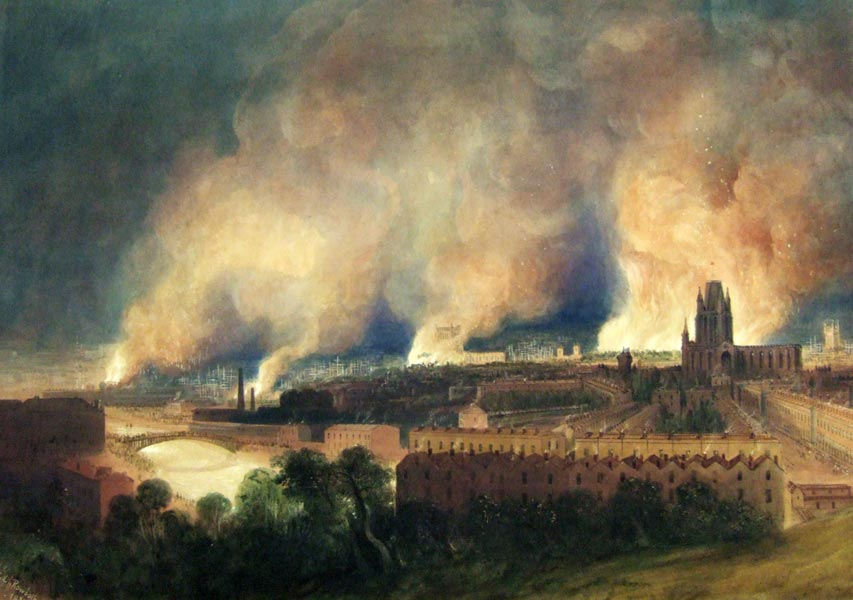
Bristol Burns

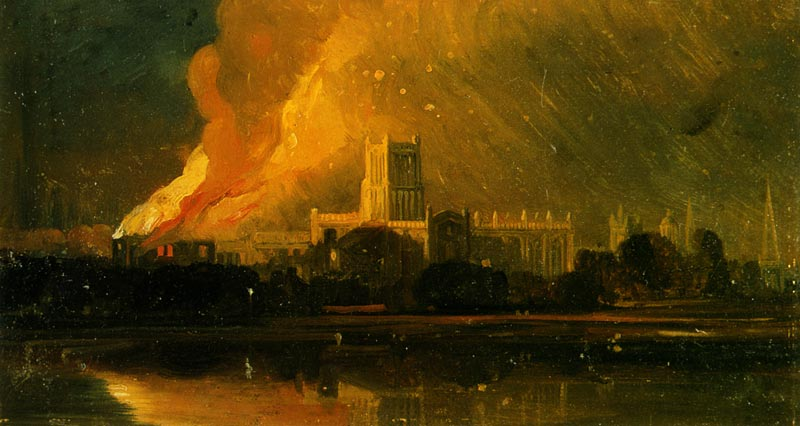
The Burning of the Bishop's Palace

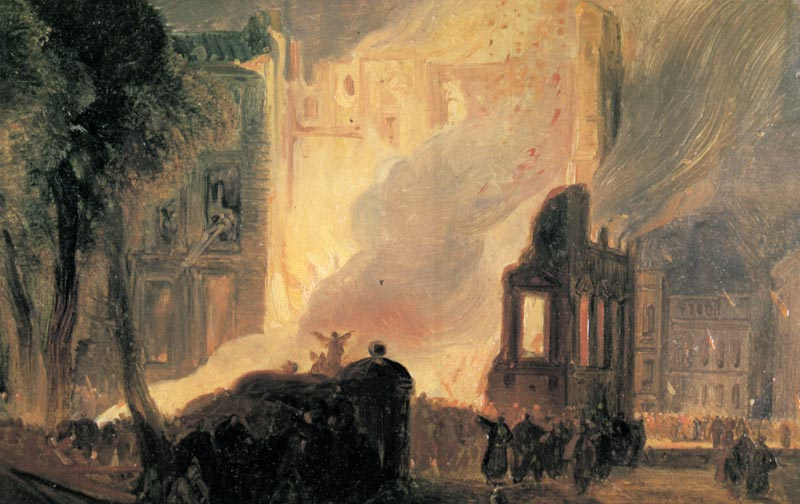
The Burning of the Mansion House, Queen Square

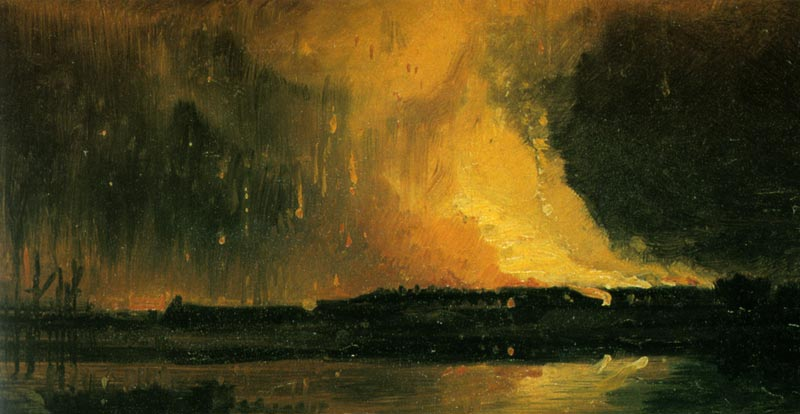
The Burning of the New Gaol from Canon's Marsh

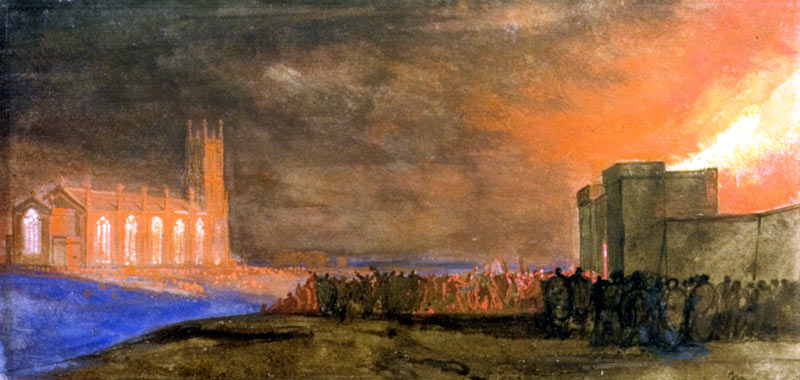
The Burning of the New Gaol with St. Paul’s Church, Bedminster

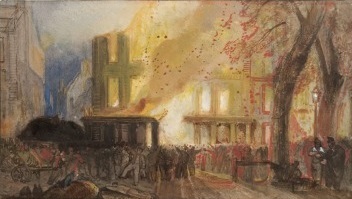
The Burning of the Custom House, Queen Square

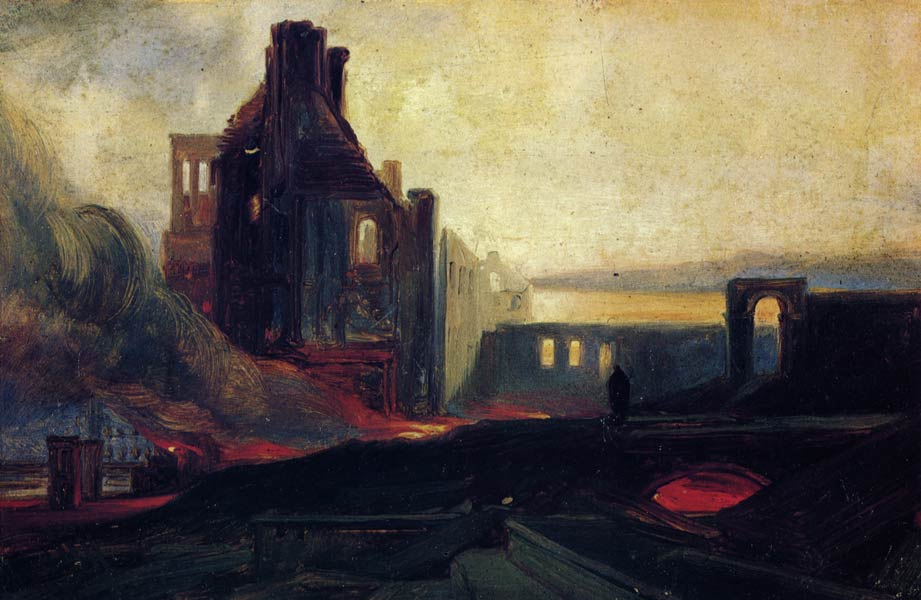
Ruins of Warehouse in Prince Street

== See also ==
- Bristol riots
