= Queen Square House, Bristol =

Building in Bristol, England

Queen Square House
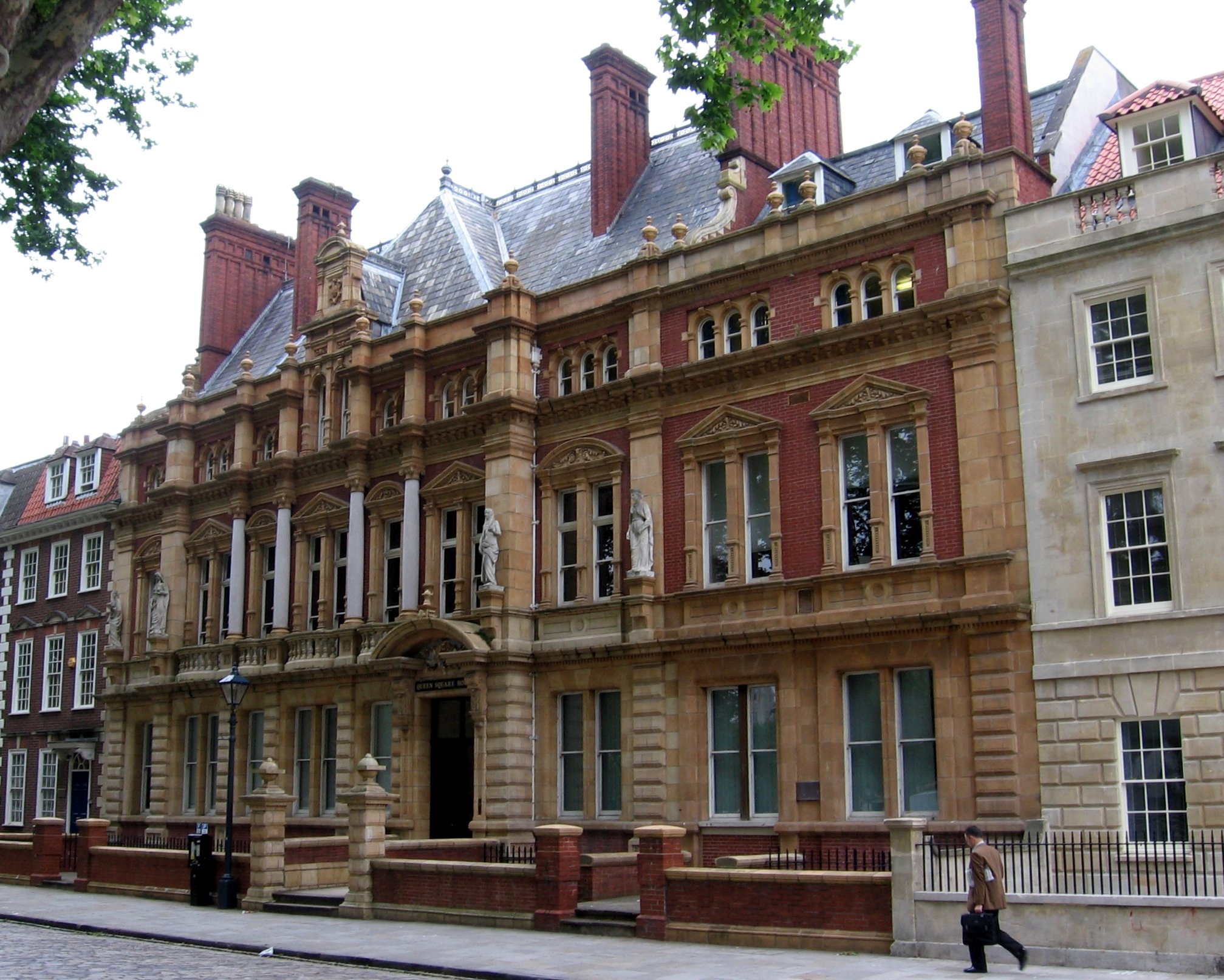

- Location within Bristol

General information
- Architectural style: Classical
- Location: Bristol, England
- Coordinates: 51.449674°N 2.593803°W
- Completed: 1889
- Client: Port of Bristol Authority

Design and construction
- Architect: William Venn Gough

Queen Square House is an historic building situated in Queen Square, Bristol, England.

Originally constructed in 1889 to the plans of William Venn Gough, as the Port of Bristol Authority Docks Office, it is in a richly decorated Classical style with a roof in the French Empire style.

It has been designated by English Heritage as a grade II listed building.

The building Was built using terracotta made by Gibbs and Canning of Tamworth. This is recorded in the Bristol mercury of 6 May 1886 - "The front, which is faced with buff terracotta and red brick...internally...buff terracotta, panels of pink terracotta containing symbolical figures being introduced into the dados..and the terracotta by Gibbs and Canning of Tamworth."
