= William Venn Gough =

British architect

William Venn Gough (1842–1918) was an architect responsible for a number of prominent buildings in Bristol. His works include the Cabot Tower, Colston's Girls' School (now Montpelier High School), Trinity Road Library, St Aldhelm's church and South Street School in Bedminster, the village hall in Yatton, and Port of Bristol Authority Docks Office, now Queen Square House, in Queen Square.

Gough collaborated with Archibald Ponton on buildings such as Bristol's Granary on Welsh Back.

From 1872 he had an office at Athenaeum Chambers, Nicholas Street, Bristol and then from 1898 to 1906 at 98, Hampton Road, Bristol. He then moved to 24, Bridge Street, Bristol until 1914.

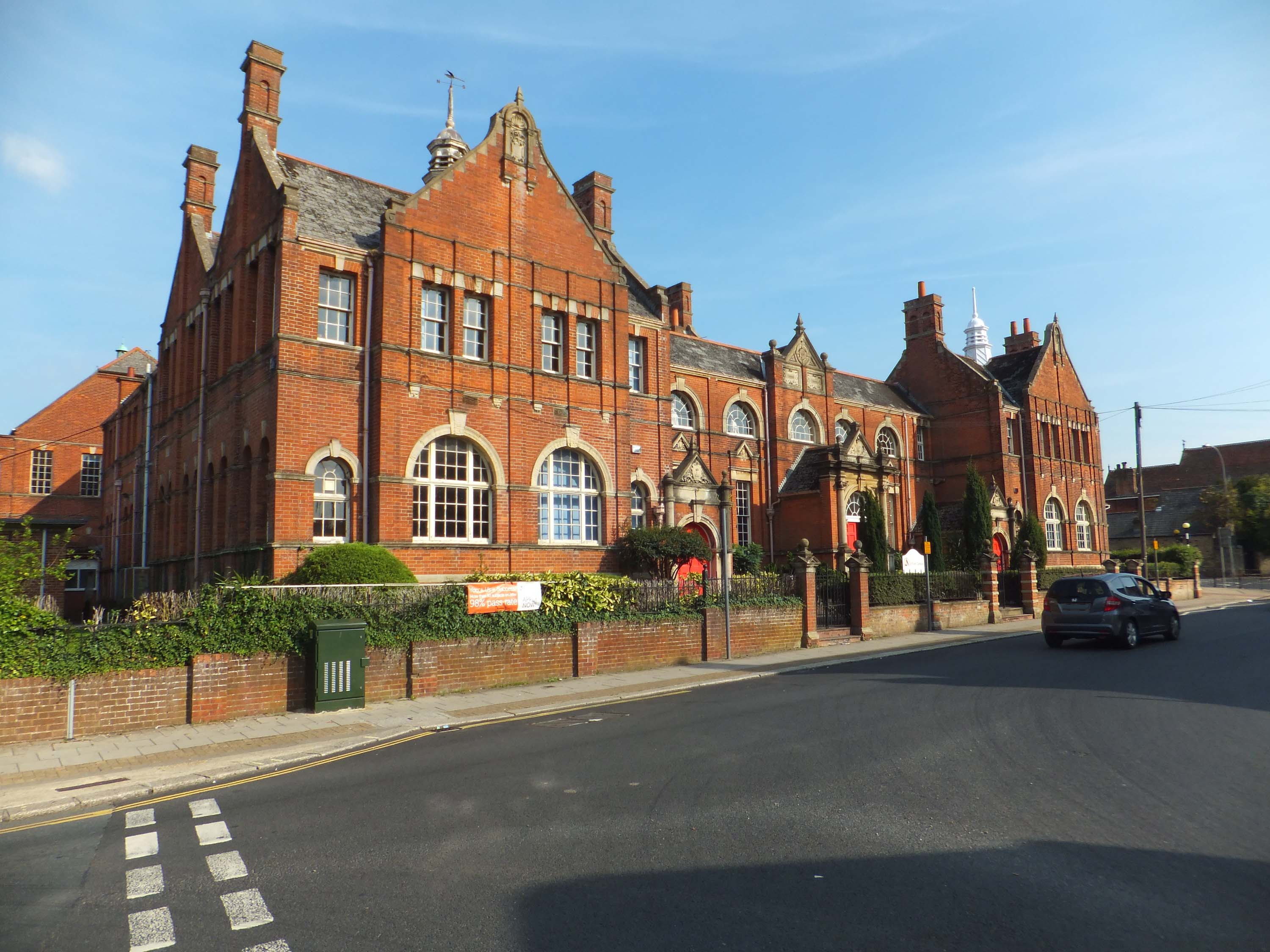
Newport Institute and Seely Library building

In 1904 William Venn Gough designed the Technical Institute and Seely Library, Newport, Isle of Wight; the building was Grade II listed in 1972.

In 1908 Gough designed the memorial for John Kay, inventor of the Flying Shuttle, in Kay Gardens, Bury, Lancashire; the memorial was Grade II listed in 1985.
