= Queen Square, Bristol =

Public square in Bristol, England

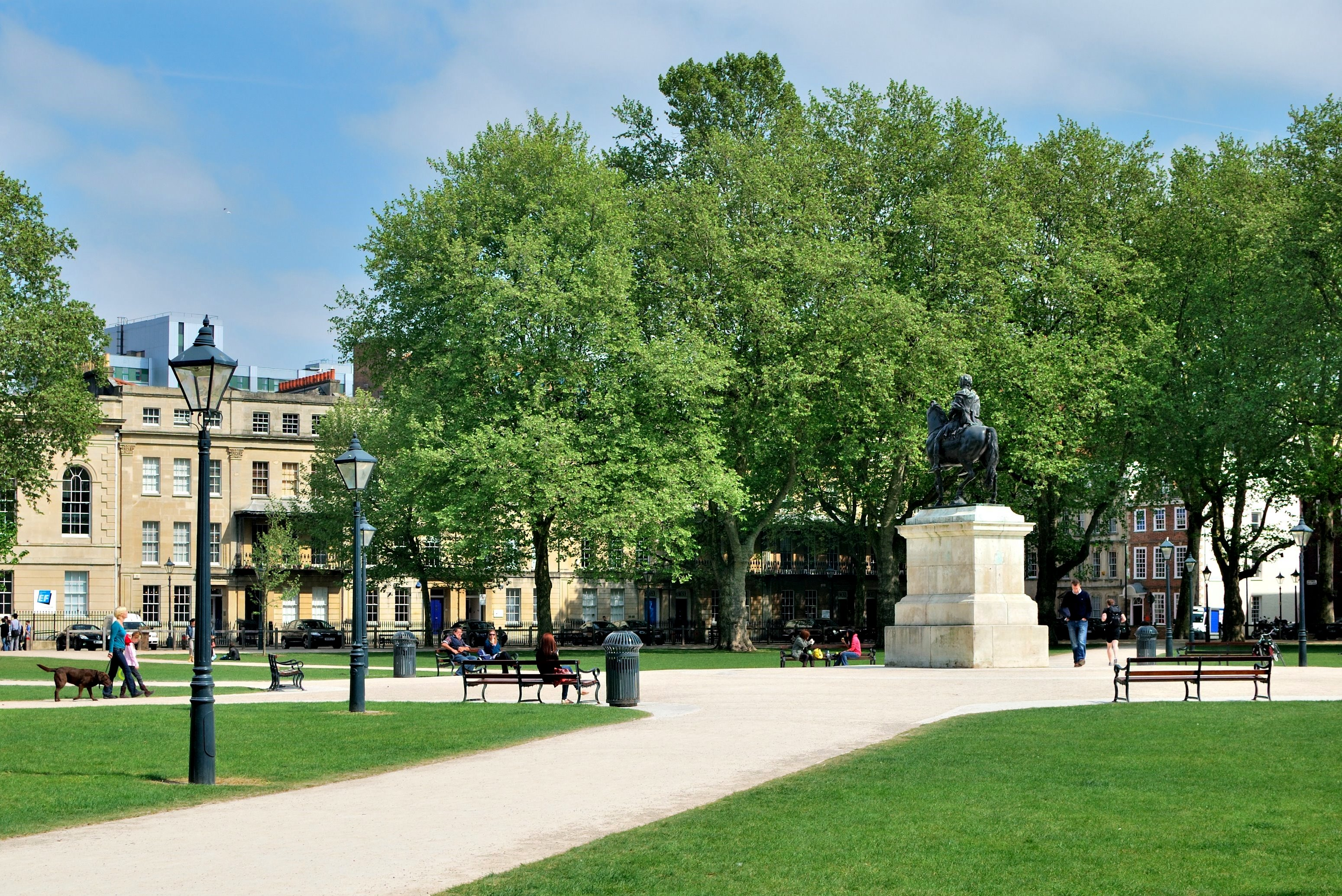
- The centre of Queen Square, seen from the south-west corner

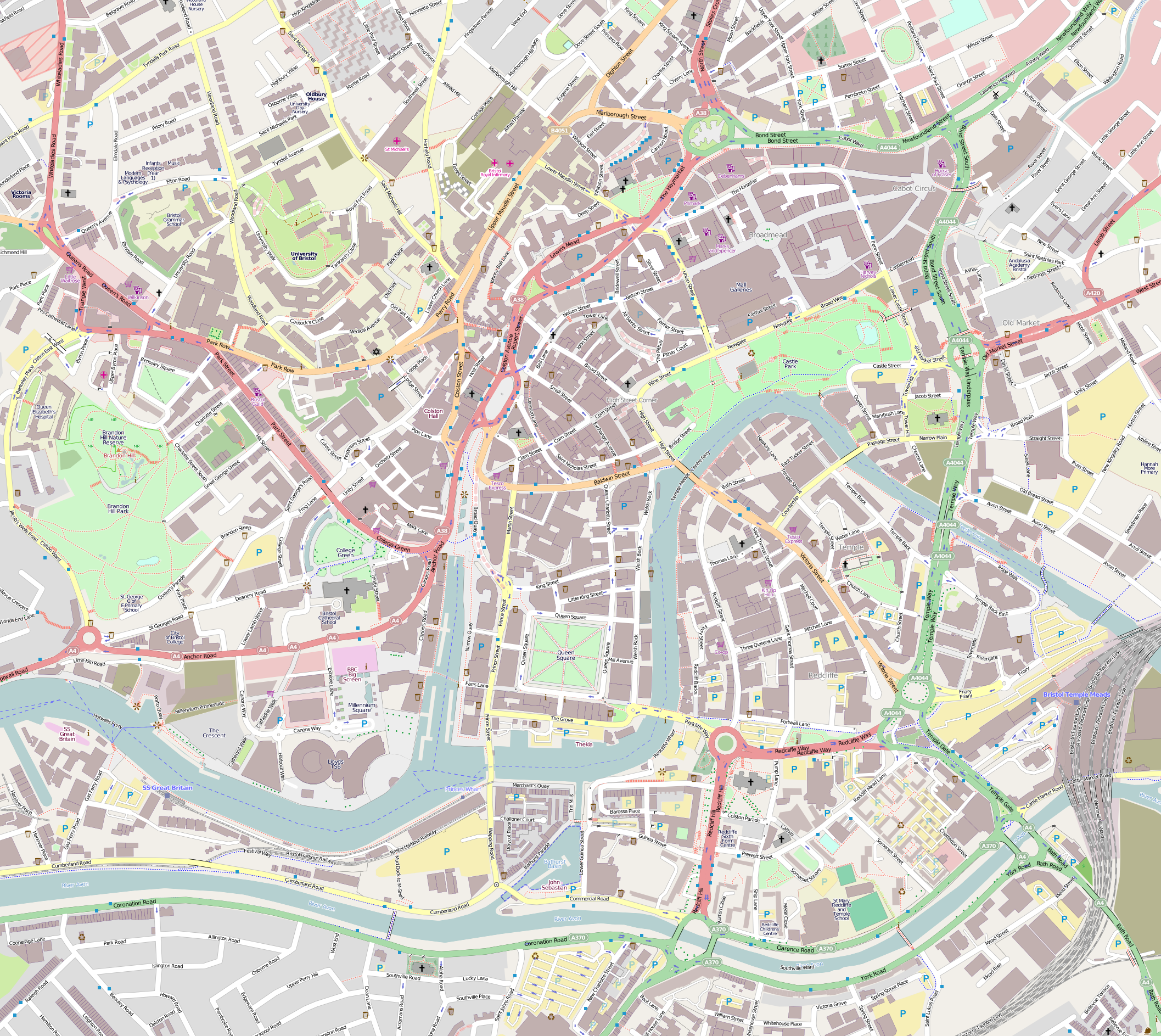
- Location within Bristol Central
- Location: Bristol
- OS grid: ST591722
- Coordinates: 51.4505°N 2.595°W
- Area: 2.4 hectares (5.9 acres)
- Created: 1699
- Operator: Bristol City Council

Queen Square is a 2.4 hectares (5.9 acres) Georgian square in the centre of Bristol, England. Following the 1831 riot, Queen Square declined through the latter part of the 19th century, was threatened with a main line railway station, but then bisected by a dual carriageway in the 1930s. By 1991, 20,000 vehicles including scheduled buses were crossing the square every day, and over 30% of the buildings around it were vacant.

In 1999, a successful bid for National Lottery funding allowed Queen Square to be restored to its approximate 1817 layout. The buses were diverted, the dual carriageway was removed, forecourts and railings were restored, and Queen Square re-emerged as a magnificent public space surrounded by high quality commercial accommodation.

== History ==
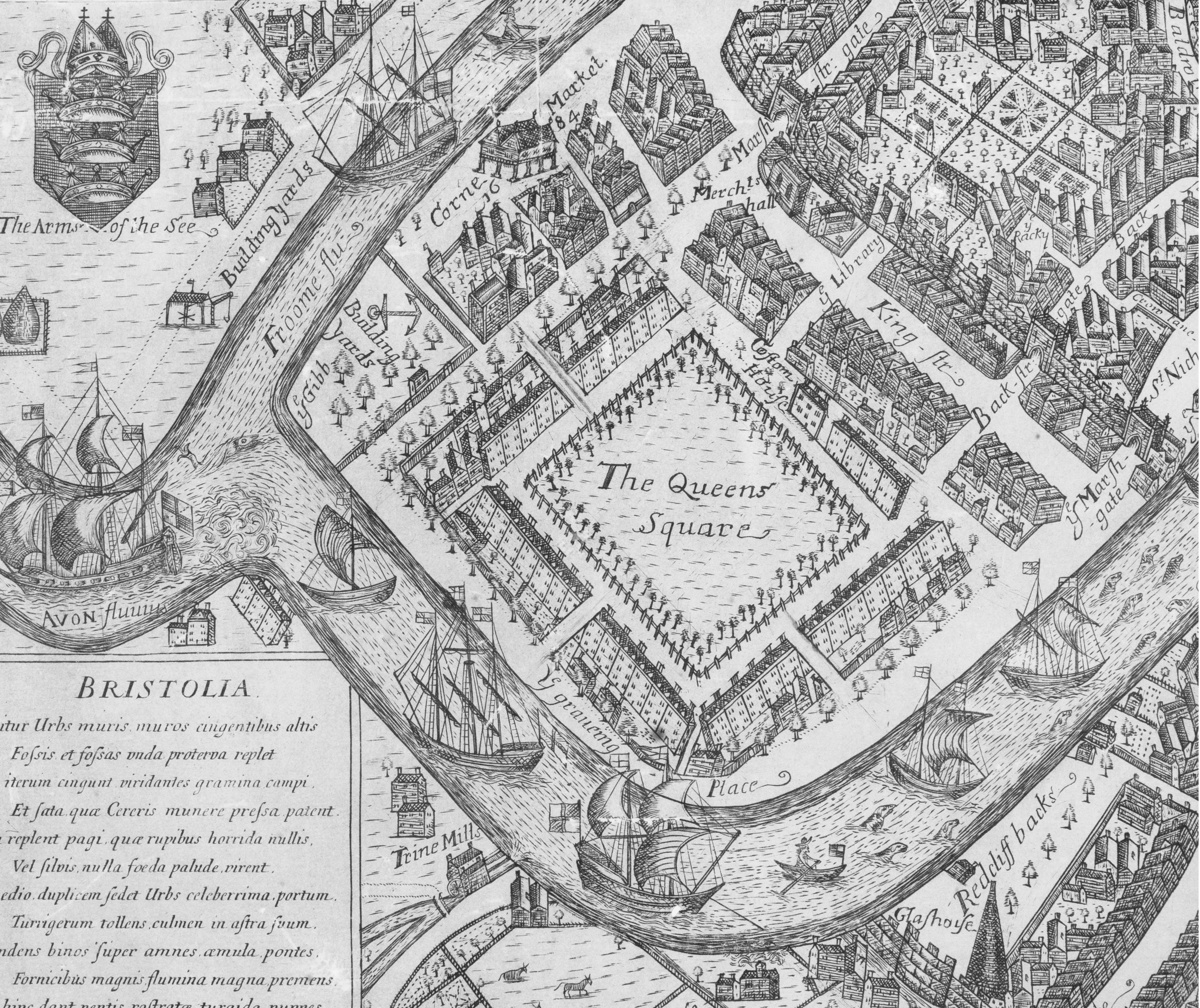
Millerd map 1728 The Queens Square

The site of Queen Square was once part of a large area of marsh land which Robert Fitzhardinge (founder of the abbey which is now Bristol Cathedral) included in its endowments. When the marsh was cut in two by the digging of St Augustine's Reach in the 13th century, the Abbot gave the eastern portion (which became the Town Marsh) to Bristol and retained the western portion (which became Canon's Marsh).

The Town Marsh lay outside a fortified wall which was built to the north of the current line of King Street; new building work took place to the north of this wall on land made available by blocking the old course of the River Frome.

The Town Marsh became an important open recreation area, with bear-baiting and a bull ring, and was also used to practice weaponry, play bowls, hang pirates, store gunpowder, and dump rubbish. By the 1660s buildings were appearing on King Street and Prince Street.

In 1699 Bristol's Council had debts of £16,000 which they could barely service: a new source of income was required. Town Clerk John Romsey, together with his business crony, Mayor John Batchelor, proposed to address this problem by selling off building plots on the marsh at an annual ground rent of one shilling (£0.05) per 1 foot (0.30 m) of frontage. There was a rush to take out leases, sometimes on more than one property, which the Sheriff and three subsequent mayors all joined. The leases stipulated that the buildings must be of three stories of set heights, and of brick - an unusual material for Bristol at that time, possibly chosen because Romsey had a friend who owned a brick kiln.

The square was named in honour of Queen Anne, who visited Bristol in 1702, and it became the home of the merchant elite. It was conveniently placed for both arms of the harbour, but its low-lying position surrounded on three sides by a tidal river had disadvantages too: an 'assemblage of nastiness' floated in the river, and when the tide failed to carry this away it offended the eyes and nostrils of those living in the square. This was one of the factors which ultimately led the wealthy to the move up the hill to Clifton.

Privateer Woodes Rogers lived on the south side of the square; a plaque commemorates this on the building that now occupies the site of his former home. Rogers circumnavigated the globe in 1707-1711, rescuing Alexander Selkirk (the inspiration for Dafoe's Robinson Crusoe) from Juan Fernández Island during his voyage.

William Miles (1728–1803), Sheriff of Bristol in 1766, Mayor of Bristol in 1780 and Warden of the Merchant Venturers, lived at number 61 (now renumbered as 69/70/71) and the house became the offices of his family's extensive business interests.

The first overseas US Consulate was established at what is now No.37 Queen Square in 1792.

=== 1831 riot ===
The 3rd Dragoon Guards charging at rioters in the square on 31 October 1831

In 1831 Queen Square was the focus of the 1831 Bristol riots in which half the buildings in the square were destroyed. The trigger for this was the arrival in Bristol of Recorder Sir Charles Wetherell, who misjudged Bristolians' support for some of his earlier positions to mean that they agreed with his opposition to the Reform Bill. Wetherell arrived in Bristol on 29 October 1831 and was received by a mob who jeered and threw stones at him. At the Guildhall, he inflamed the situation by threatening to imprison any member of the mob who could be identified; they followed him to the Mansion House in Queen Square from which he was able to escape in disguise.

The mayor and corporation, who actually supported reform, remained trapped in the Mansion House. Their appeals for help fell on deaf ears; Bristolians despised the corporation and were not inclined to defend them. To make things worse, as soon as the dignitaries were inside the Mansion House the special constables who had been defending them set about getting their own back on the crowd, reviving the disturbance. There followed three days of rioting, looting and arson, fuelled by plentiful supplies of alcohol from the well-stocked cellars of residents, which were finally brought to a halt when Lieutenant-Colonel Thomas Brereton of the 14th Dragoons led a charge with drawn swords through the mob. Hundreds were killed and wounded and the mob dispersed. Brereton was later court-martialled for leniency because he had initially refused to open fire on the crowds, but shot himself before the conclusion of his trial.

About 100 people involved were tried in January 1832 by Chief Justice Tindal. Four men were hanged, despite a petition of 10,000 Bristolian signatures which was given to King William IV.

=== Decline ===
Gentlemen, there is no "architecture" in this square and you know it.

— Bristol Councillor, arguing in favour of building the Inner Circuit Road through Queen Square, 1930s

The north and west sides of Queen Square were quickly rebuilt after the riots of 1831, but prosperous Bristolians took to the hills and moved to the 'Tory redoubt' of Clifton.

In the early 1860s, when the Bristol and Clifton Railway Company proposed to build Bristol Central railway station in Queen Square, there was no objection on conservation grounds and the scheme received general approval, supported by the Great Western Railway and backed by many of the city's business leaders. Ultimately concerns that it would 'divert the commerce of the city', which is to say take trade away from various industries in the docks, led to the scheme's demise. However, in 1937 Bristol Corporation approved the construction of a dual carriageway road diagonally across the square, from the north-west to the south-east corner, destroying its peace and tranquillity. This formed part of the Inner Circuit Road, connecting Redcliffe Way with The Centre, and involved the demolition of property in both corners of the Square and the re-alignment of the Rysbrack statue.

=== Restoration ===
By 1966 the corporation were looking at the possibility of reducing the flow of traffic through the square by changing the route of the Inner Circuit Road to pass along The Grove and thence across the mouth of St Augustine's Reach. They even considered it possible that the road across Queen Square might eventually be closed if circumstances permitted. By the 1980s it was recognised that the dual carriageway was a "massive intrusion" on the amenity of the square, and plans were made to "put things right".

In 1992 the dual carriageway was closed to through traffic for an initial six-month trial period. It never reopened. Buses continued to pass around the Square, however, until they were eventually diverted via The Grove and Prince Street.

The square has now been restored to a very high standard. The railings and forecourts of the surrounding buildings have been reinstated, and the central open space with its promenades and equestrian statue restored to their former grandeur. The restoration is recognised as a major success.

== Queen Square today ==
Queen Square is now a popular place for visitors and office workers to relax, and receives an estimated 1.6 million visitors per year. It regularly hosts outdoor theatre and cinema, music concerts, business exhibitions and other major events, and an annual petanque league run by the Queen Square Association.

== Sites of interest ==
- In the centre of the Square is an idealised equestrian statue of William III by John Michael Rysbrack, cast in 1733 and erected in 1736 to signify the city's loyalty. The brass statue is on a Portland ashlar pedestal with a moulded plinth and cornice and is a grade I listed building.
- The north side contains the Custom House (1835–37) by Sydney Smirke, (II* listed), and a terrace (1833) by Henry Rumley, which are now offices, (II* listed).
- The east side contains some 20th-century buildings and the Port Authority Office (1889) by William Venn Gough. The Sailors Refuge which makes up nos 27–29 dates from 1709–11 and is II* listed.
- The south side contains varied 18th century buildings, which are similar to those nearby in Queen Charlotte Street and King Street. Two are by R.S. Pope.
- The west side was rebuilt in the 1830s after the riot, largely by Henry Rumley, some of which are still private houses but many are offices.

== Listed buildings ==
The majority of buildings on Queen Square are listed. Some, like the central statue, are of outstanding value in their own right; others such as No.12 are included mainly for their group value:

Number	Grade	Year listed	Description
	I	1959	Equestrian statue of William III, Queen Square
Custom House	II*	1977 (amended 1994)	Custom House and attached rear area wall and piers, Queen Square
1 to 9	II*	1959	1-9, Queen Square
10 and 12	II	1959 (amended 1994)	38, Welsh Back, 10 and 12, Queen Square
17 and 18	II	1959	17 and 18, Queen Square
18-21	II	1977 (amended 1994)	Queen Square House and attached front area walls and piers
22, 23 and 24	II	1959	22, 23 and 24, Queen Square
27 and 28	II*	1959 (amended 1994)	27 and 28, Queen Square
29	II*	1959 (amended 1994)	29, Queen Square
36, 37 and 38	II*	1959 (amended 1994)	36, 37 and 38 Queen Square
46 and 47	II	1959 (amended 1994)	Numbers 46 and 47 and attached railings and piers
48	II	1959 (amended 1994)	Number 48 and attached railings and piers
49 and 50	II	1959 (amended 1994)	49 and 50, Queen Square
51	II	1959 (amended 1994)	Phoenix House and attached railings and piers
52 and 53	II	1959 (amended 1994)	52 and 53, Queen Square
54	II	1959 (amended 1994)	Number 54 and attached railings and piers
55	II	1959	55, Queen Square
56	II	1959	56, Queen Square
57	II	1959 (amended 1994)	57, Queen Square
58	II	1959 (amended 1994)	58, Queen Square
59 to 62	II	1959 (amended 1994)	Numbers 59 to 62 and attached railings and piers
69 to 72	II	1959	69-72, Queen Square
73	II	1959 (amended 1994)	Number 73 and attached front area railings

Queen Square uses a clockwise-consecutive house numbering system, with No.1 near the middle of its north side.

== Gallery ==
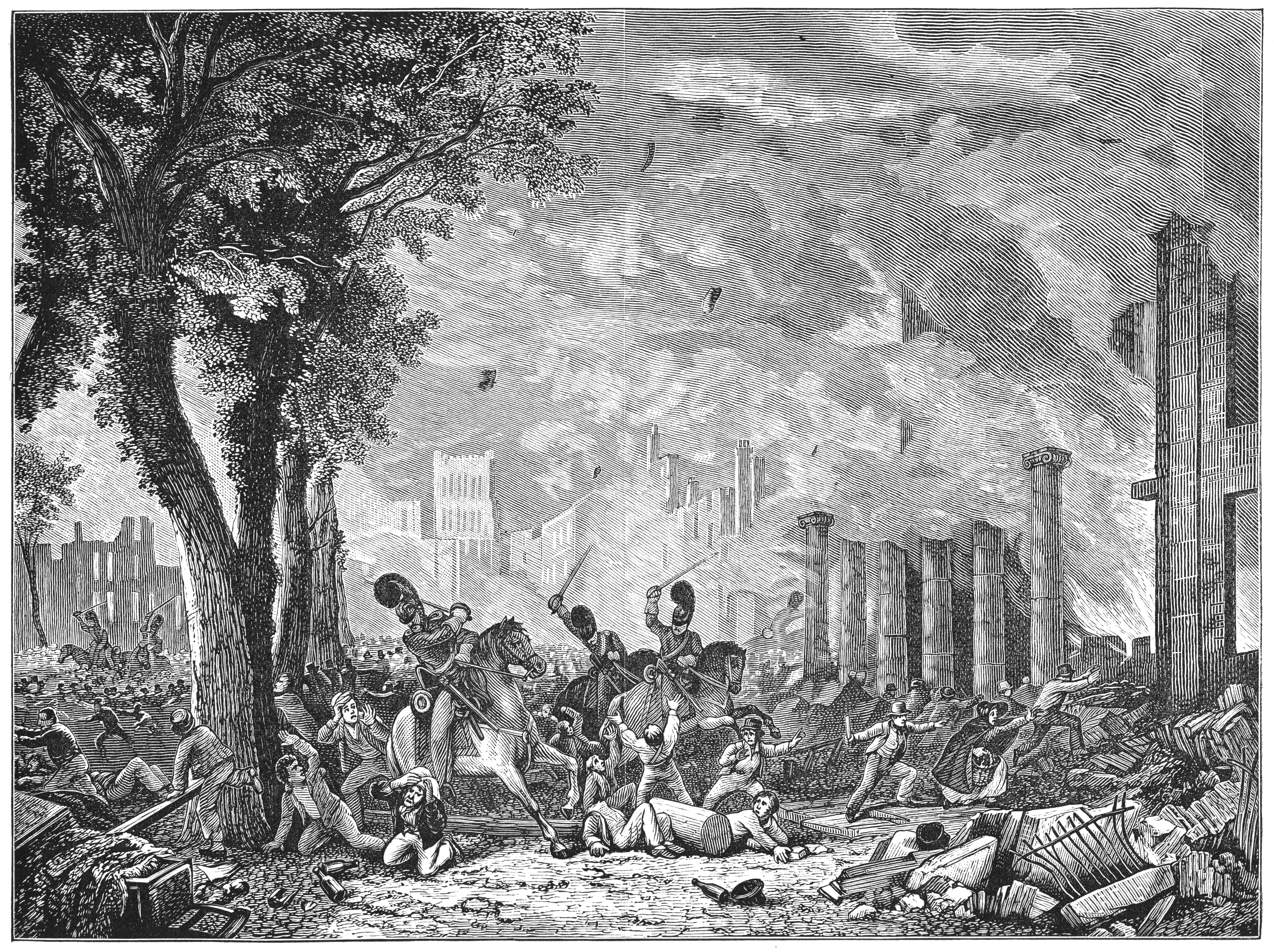
The 1831 Riot in a nineteenth-century engraving

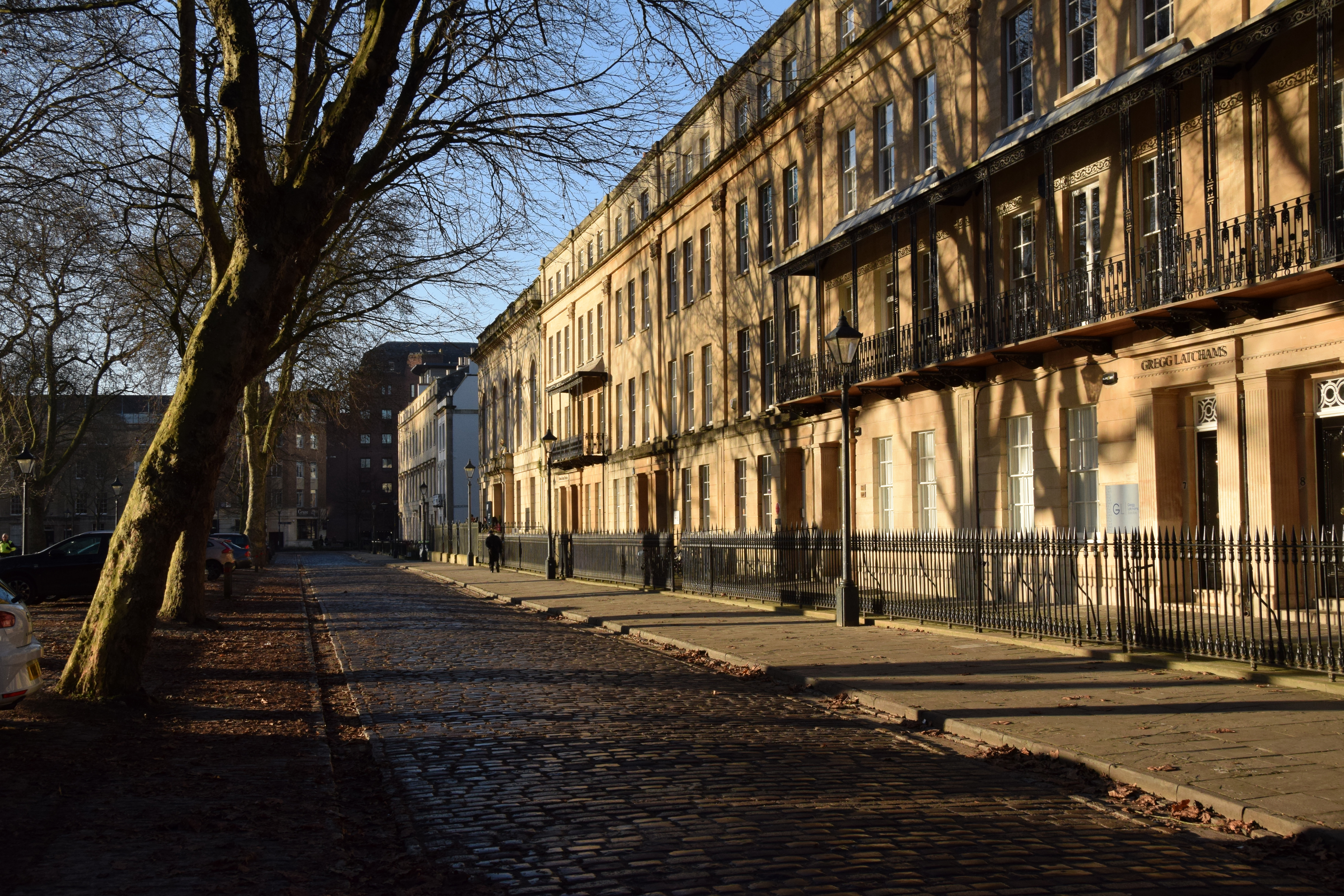
North side of Queen Square

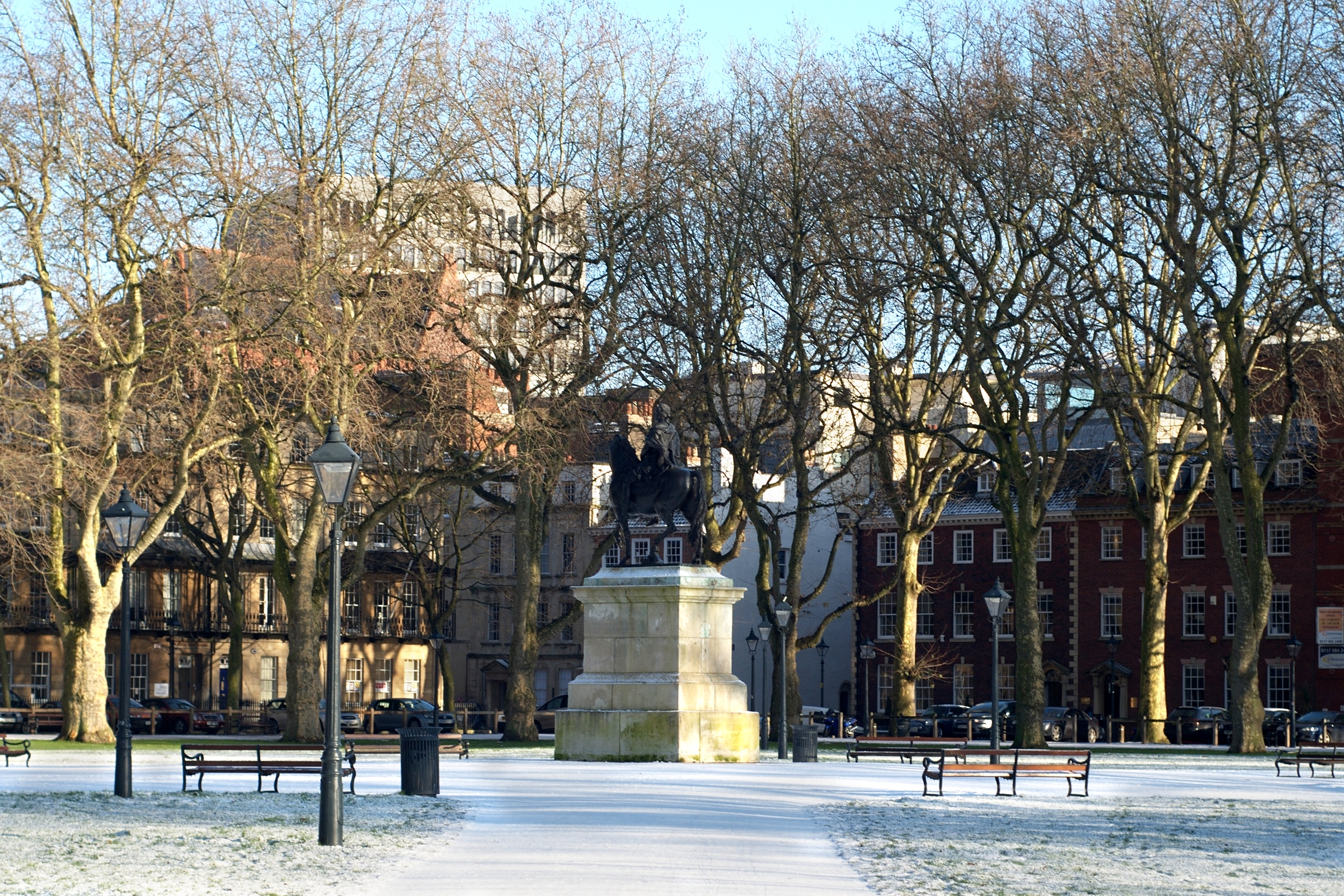
Queen Square in winter, December 2009

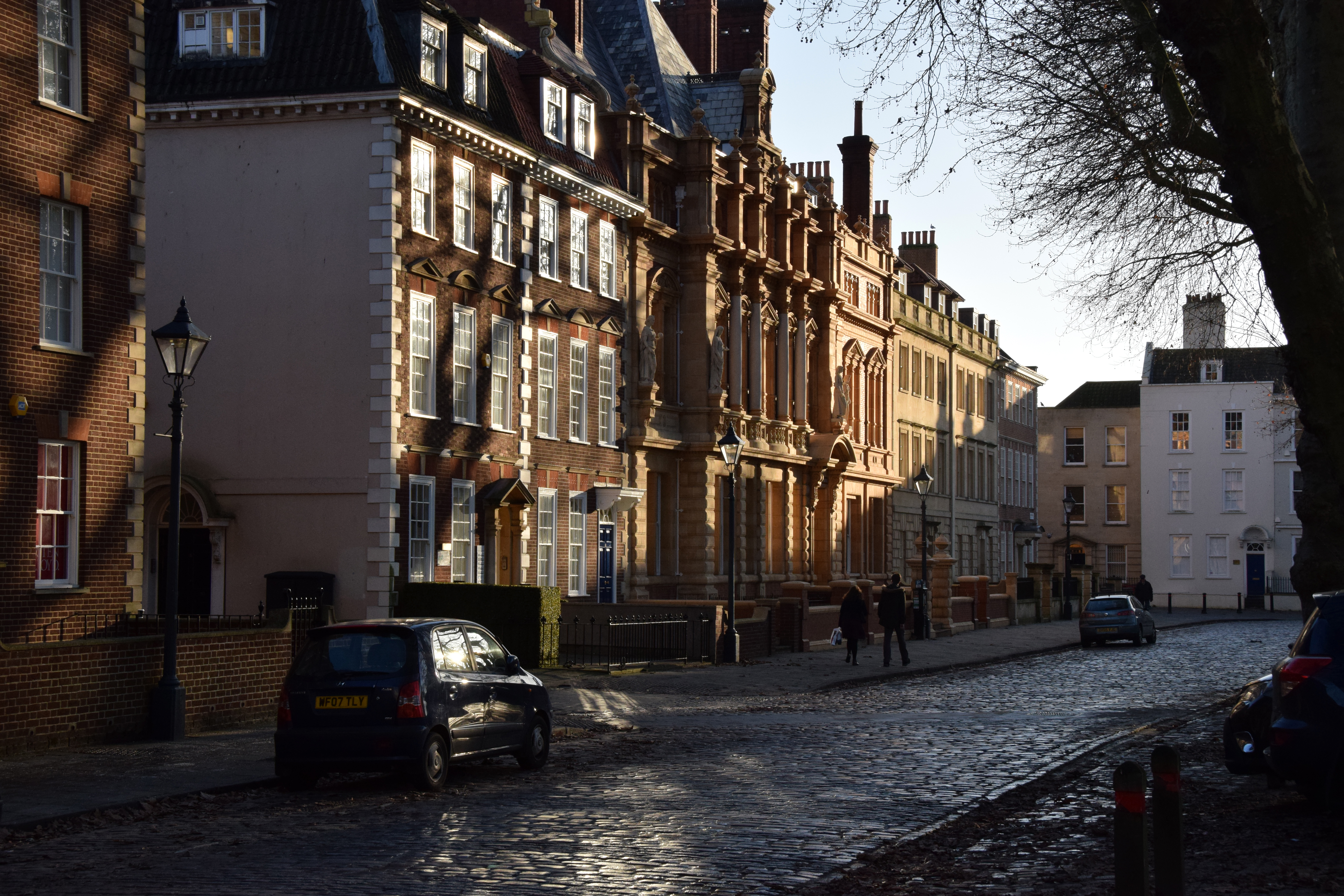
Former Port of Bristol Authority offices and east side of Queen Square

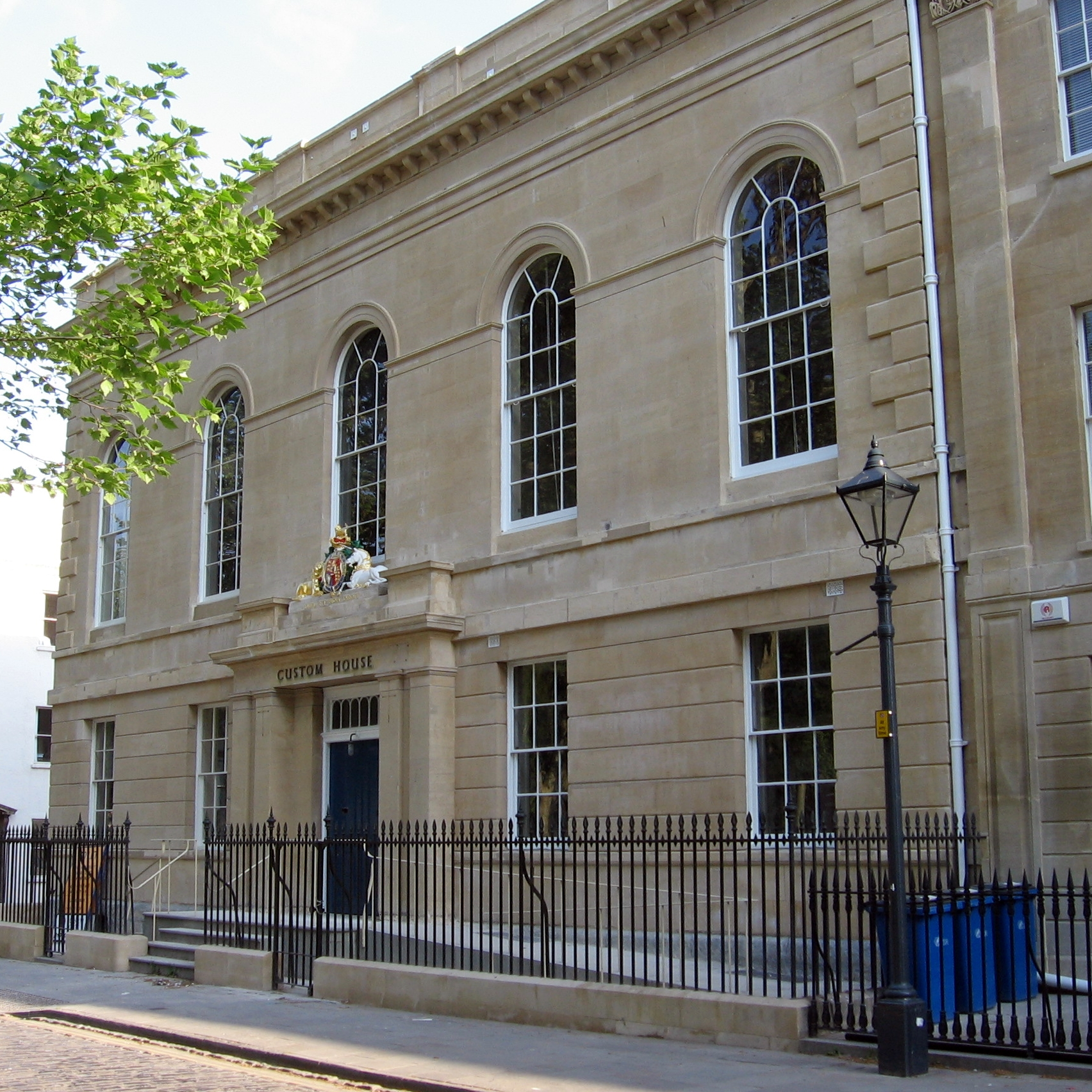
Sydney Smirke's Custom House

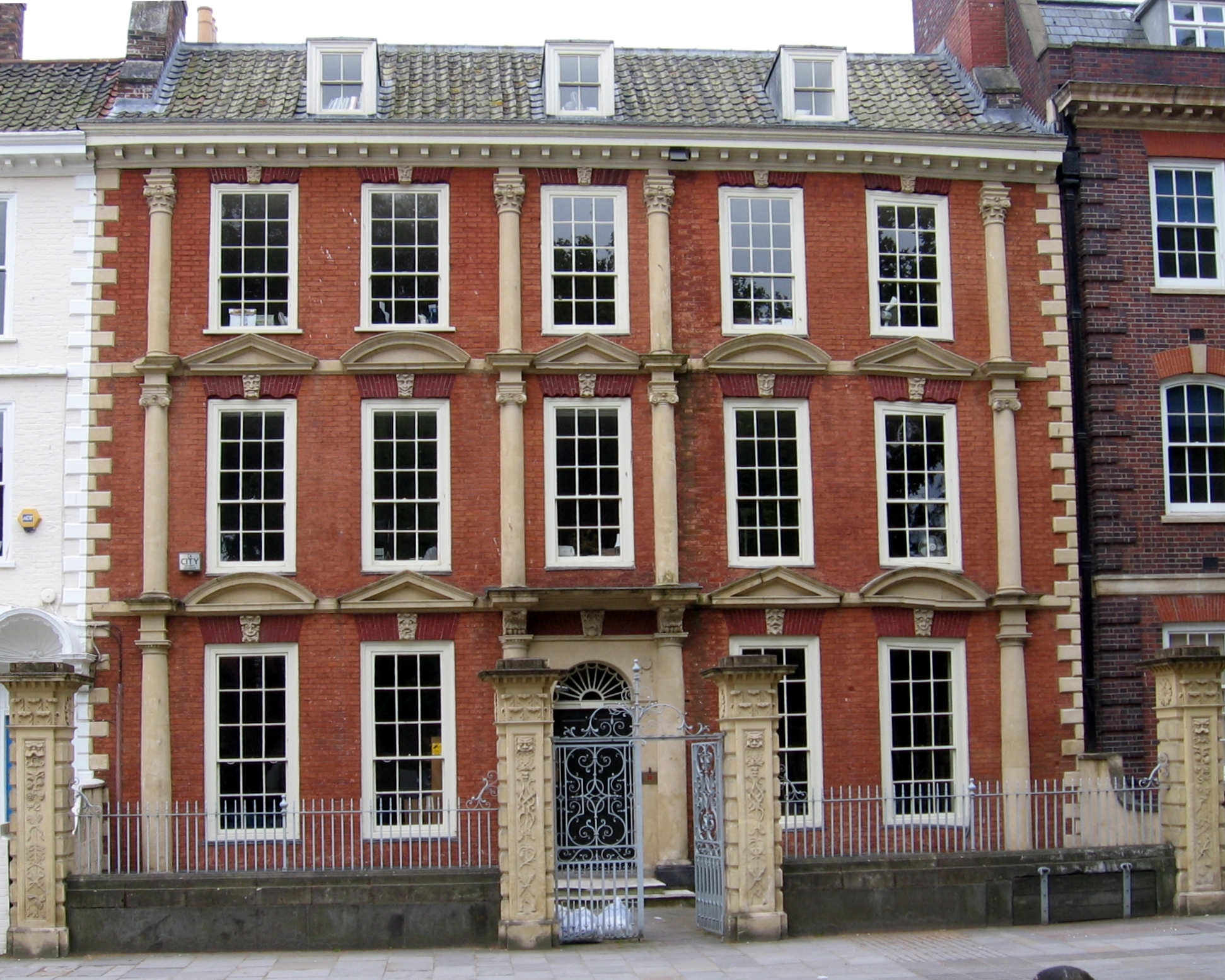
Sailors Refuge, 29 Queen Square

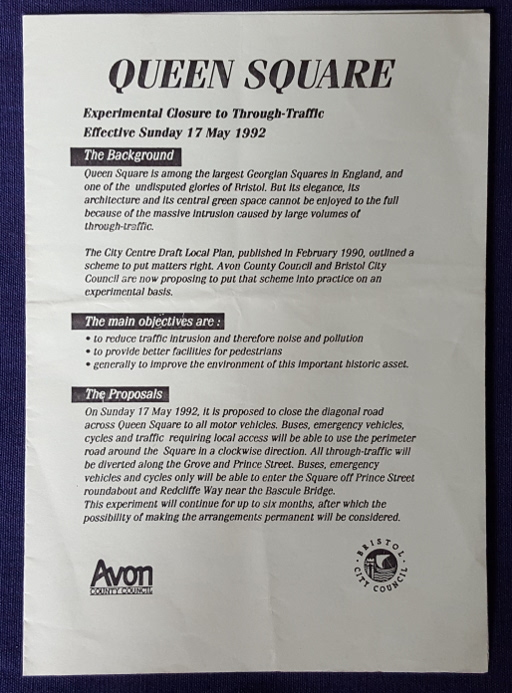
Leaflet announcing experimental closure of dual carriageway across the Square, May 1992

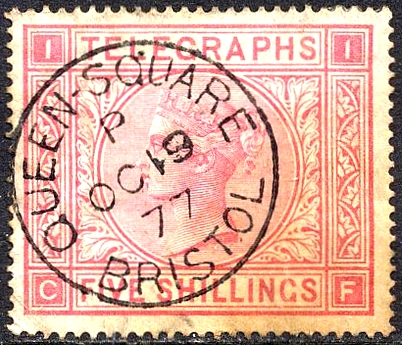
A telegraph stamp used at the telegraph office in Queen Square in 1877

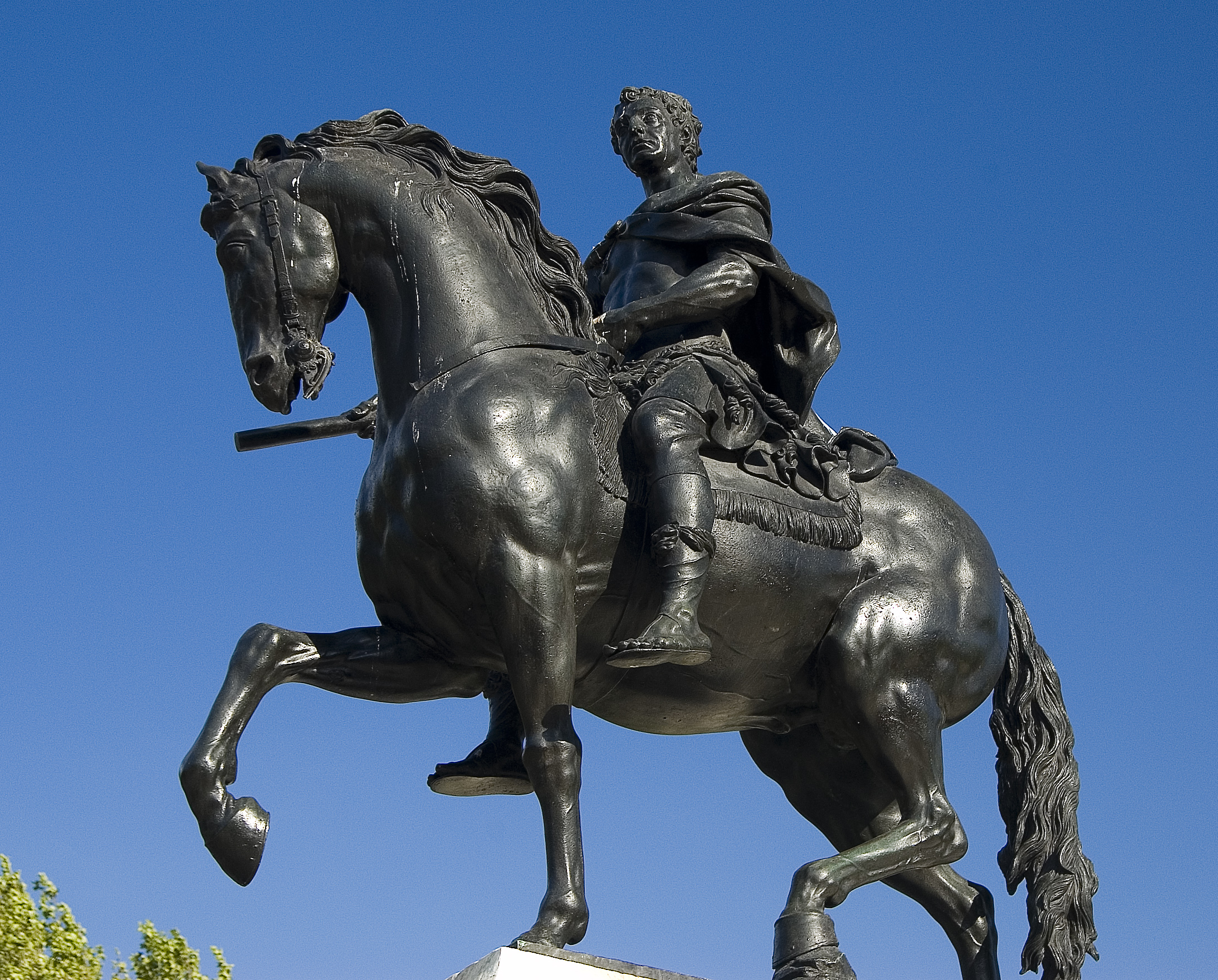
Statue of William III by John Michael Rysbrack erected in Queen Square in 1736

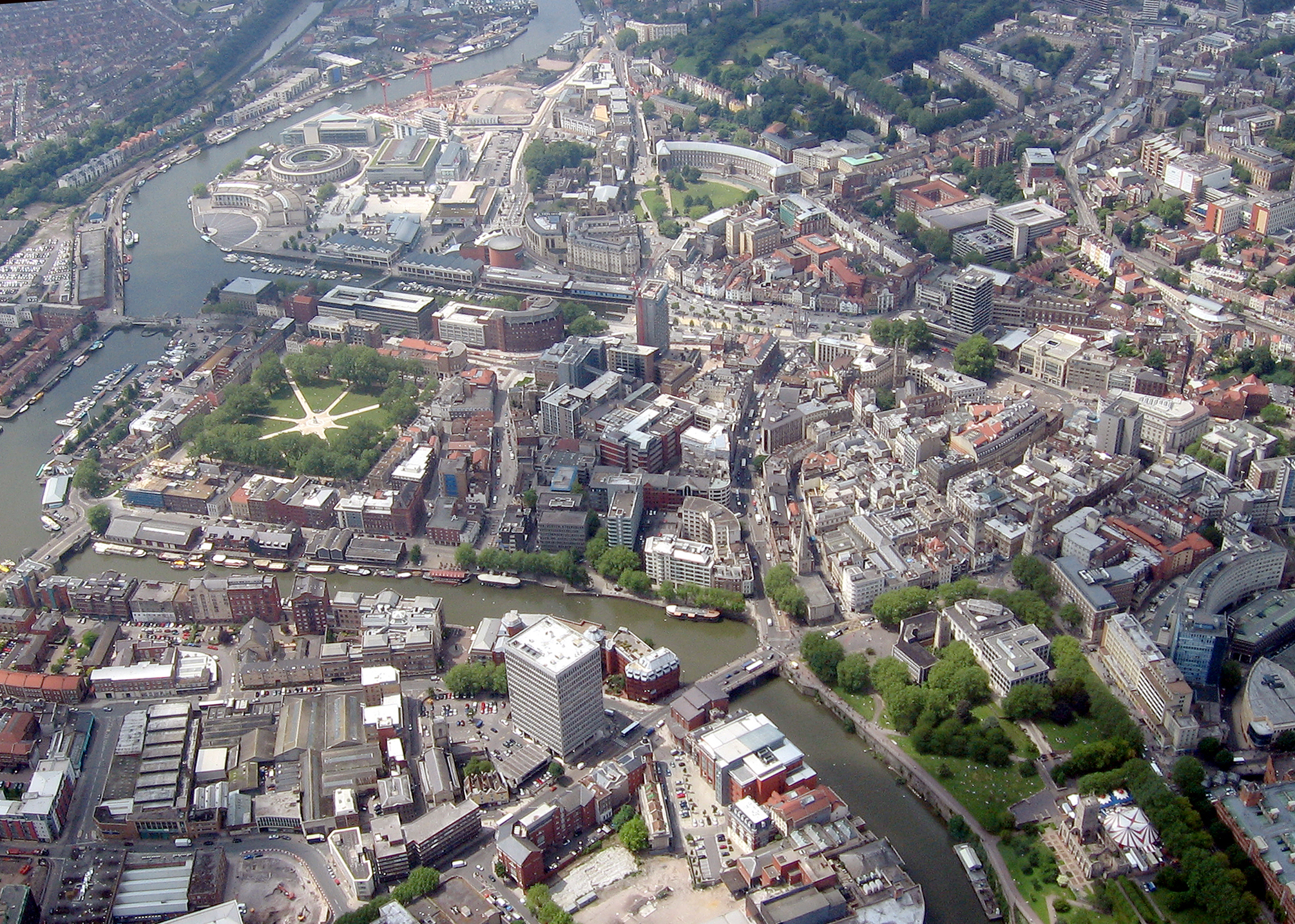
Aerial view of central Bristol; Queen Square is seen to the left of the picture
