= Charles Pinney =

Mayor of Bristol England

Mayor of Bristol
- In office 1831–1832

Personal details
- Born: 29 April 1793
- Died: 17 July 1867 (aged 74)
- Spouse: Frances Mary Still
- Children: Two sons and a daughter

Charles Pinney (29 April 1793 – 17 July 1867) was a British merchant and local politician in Bristol, England. He was a partner in a family business that ran sugar plantations in the West Indies and owned a number of slaves. Pinney was selected as mayor of Bristol in 1831 and within weeks had to manage the response to major riots. Public order was lost for a number of days and significant damage caused to the city centre. Pinney was charged with neglect of duty over his actions but was acquitted at trial. He returned to local government as an alderman, holding the position until 1853.

== Early life and career ==
Charles Pinney was the youngest son of John Pretor Pinney and his wife Jane (née Weekes), sugar planters and traders in Nevis, West Indies. Charles was born on 29 April 1793, after the couple returned to England and settled at 7 Great George Street in Bristol. Charles took over the running of his father's business, in partnership with Robert Edward Case, which included the ownership of a number of slaves on plantations in the West Indies.

Pinney was a member of the Whig Party and was president of the Anchor Society, which was then associated with the party, in 1822. He was selected as a councillor in the Bristol Corporation in 1822 and served as a sheriff from 1823-24. Pinney was one of the few Whigs in the Tory-dominated corporation, but he served until it was reformed by the Municipal Corporations Act 1835. Pinney also helped to found and run a Mechanics' Institute in the city and was a supporter of the 1830 French Revolution.

== Mayor during the 1831 riots ==
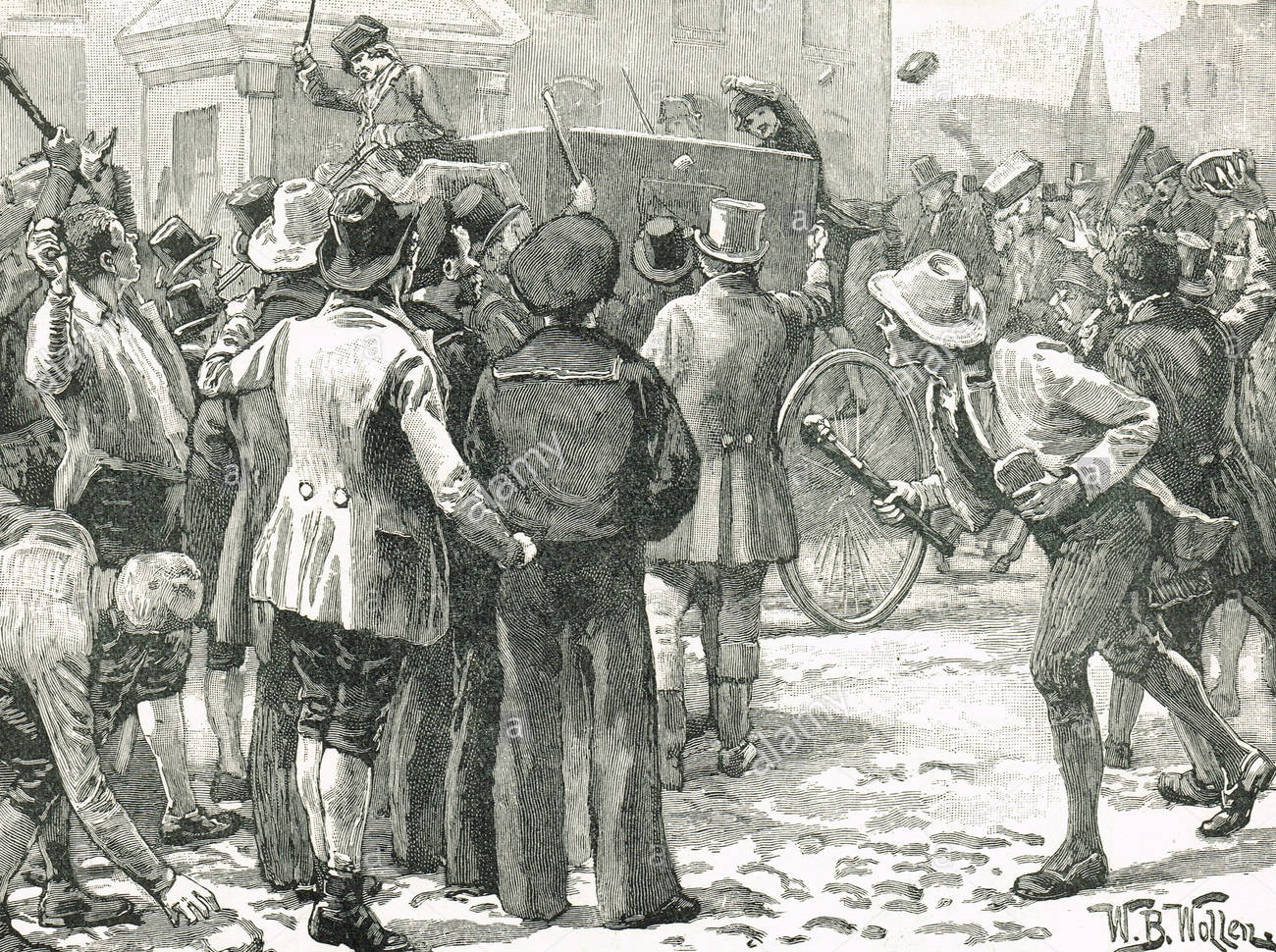
A 1901 depiction of the attack on Pinney and Wetherell's carriage

Pinney was selected as mayor of Bristol on 16 September 1831. The political environment was fraught, a Whig government was attempting to pass the second Reform Bill to implement electoral reform in the House of Commons. The Tories opposed this bill but it was supported by much of the general populace, including many in Bristol.

Pinney's selection as mayor may have been an attempt by the Tory majority in the corporation to curry favour with pro-reform elements in the city and head off unrest. Pinney attempted to remain politically neutral after his appointment, though this angered many of the Whigs who regarded him as having abandoned his beliefs to join The Establishment.

Civil disturbances occurred at the visit of the anti-reform Bishop of Bath and Wells on 24 October and the anti-reform judge Charles Wetherell on 29 October. The latter instance saw attacks on a carriage carrying Pinney and Wetherell, which escalated into the 1831 Bristol riots. The civic authorities lost control of the city until 31 October. Pinney was criticised by some for his actions during the riot and was tried at the Court of King's Bench from 25 October 1832, charged with neglect of duty. He was found not guilty of the charge by the jury after seven days.

== Later life ==
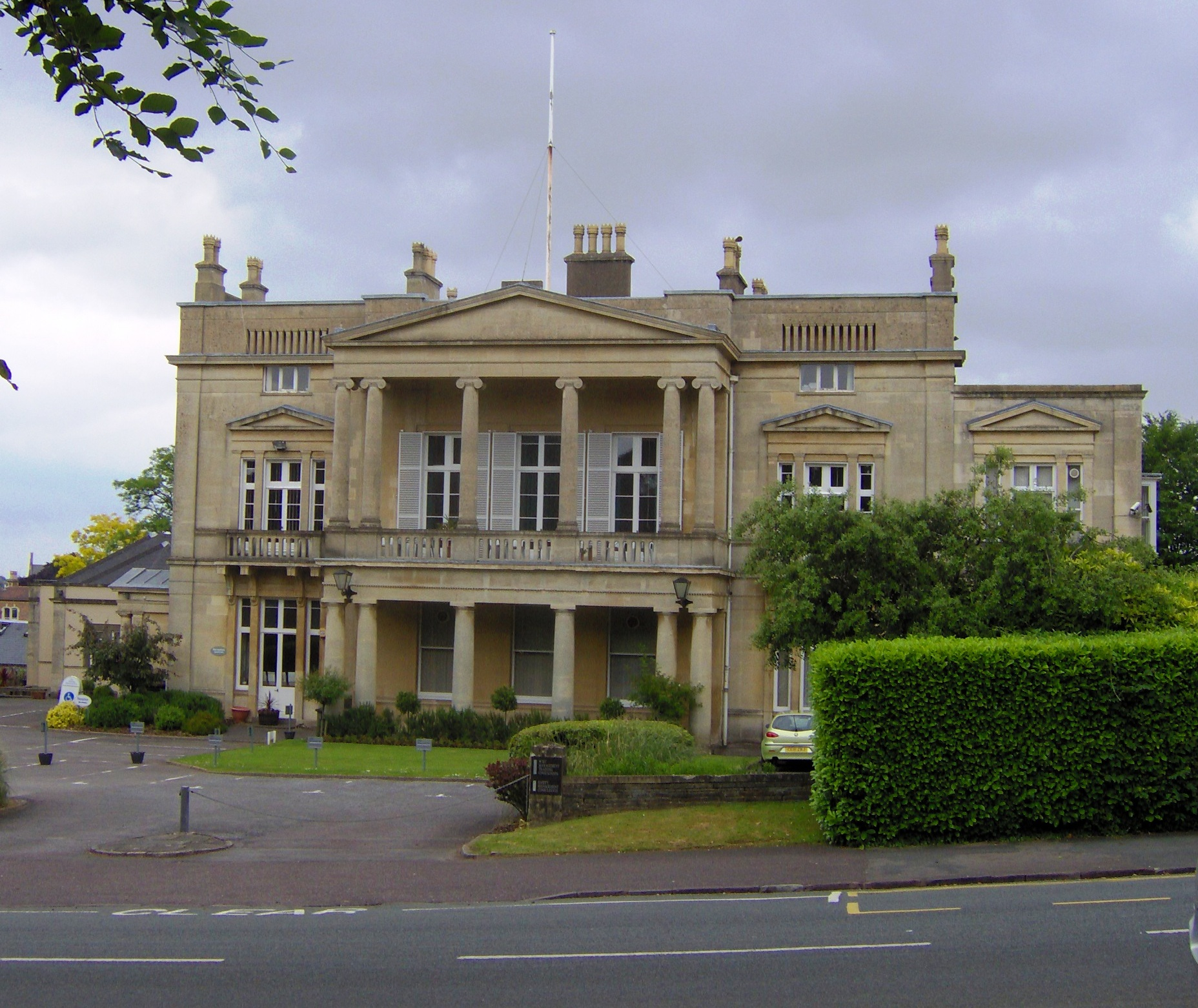
Camp House, later known as Engineers House

Pinney claimed £2,000 from the Bristol Corporation for losses of his property, principally wine and china, during the riots; he was awarded £714. He continued his business with Case and the company was awarded £3,572 in compensation for slaves following the Slavery Abolition Act 1833. Pinney failed, by 34 votes, to be elected as a Whig councillor for the St Augustine constituency in the 1835 elections to the reformed Bristol Corporation.

He was afterwards selected as an alderman, though he later defected to the Tories. The 1835 selection of aldermen restored a Tory majority to the council, which had been split 50:50 in elected members.

Pinney served as president of the Society of Merchant Venturers for 1844–45. In 1850 he unsuccessfully proposed that the corporation purchase Clifton Down, a traditional open space in the city, to preserve it from development. He ceased to be an alderman in 1853. Pinney died at his home, Camp House in Clifton, on 17 July 1867 leaving a fortune of £60,000.

== Personal life ==
Pinney was at one point close to marrying the daughter of noted slavery abolitionist William Wilberforce but the engagement was broken off and on 8 March 1831 married Frances Mary, daughter of James Charles Still, of East Knoyle, Wiltshire; they had two sons and a daughter.
