= Custom House, Bristol =

Custom House
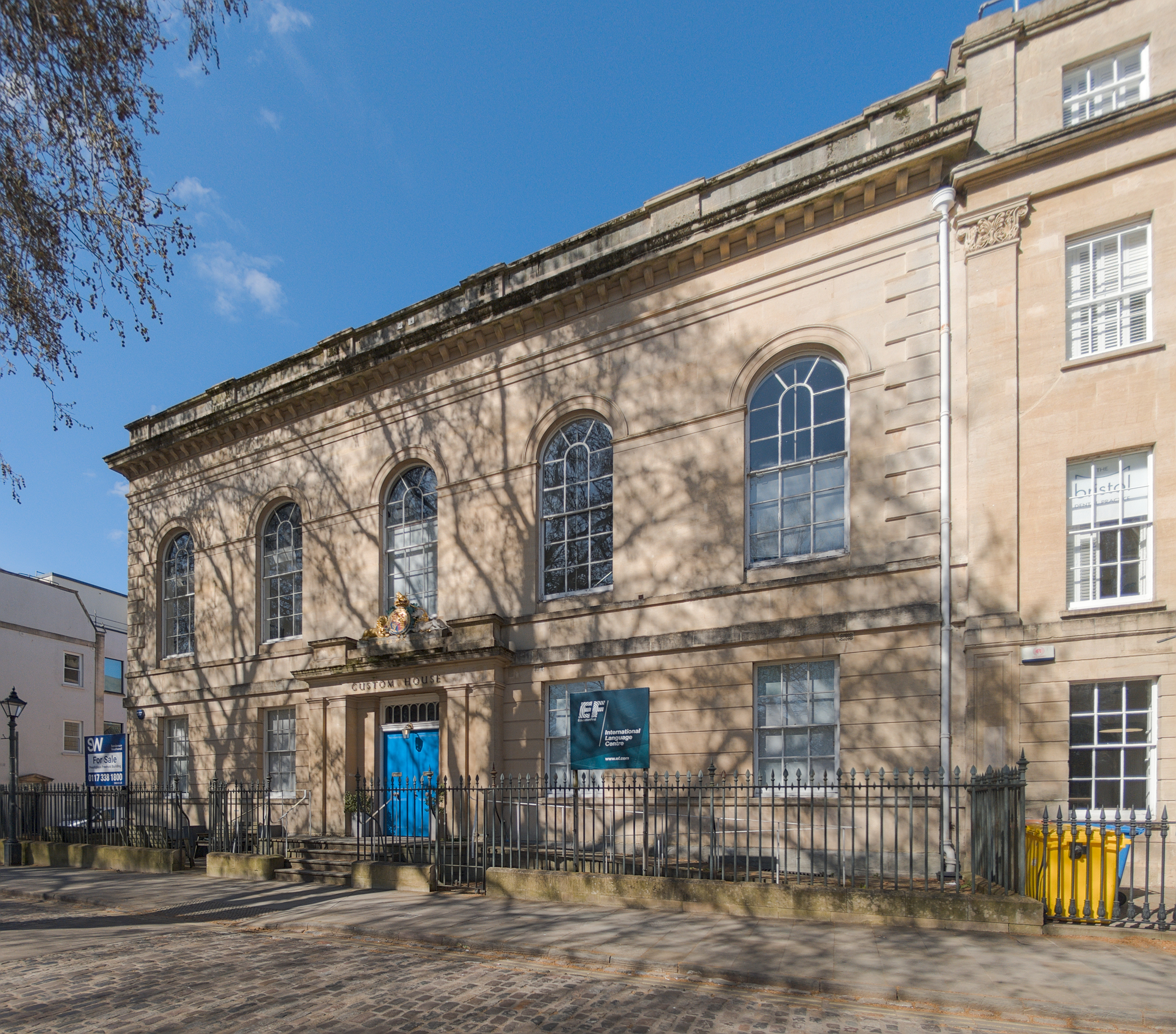
- Custom House, Bristol, 2025

- Location within Bristol
- 51°27′04″N 2°35′40″W
- Type: Civic building
- Location: Queen Square, Bristol

Site notes
- Area: Bristol

Listed Building – Grade II*
- Official name: Custom House
- Designated: 1977
- Reference no.: 1282153

The Custom House in Bristol was the building formally used for collecting customs duties on foreign trade when entering or leaving the port. The location of this building within Bristol varied over the centuries. The building now known as the 'Custom House' dates from 1836 and is located on Queen Square. Goods are no longer declared in the city itself, since the Port of Bristol has now moved entirely down to Avonmouth Docks, on the Severn Estuary.

== History ==
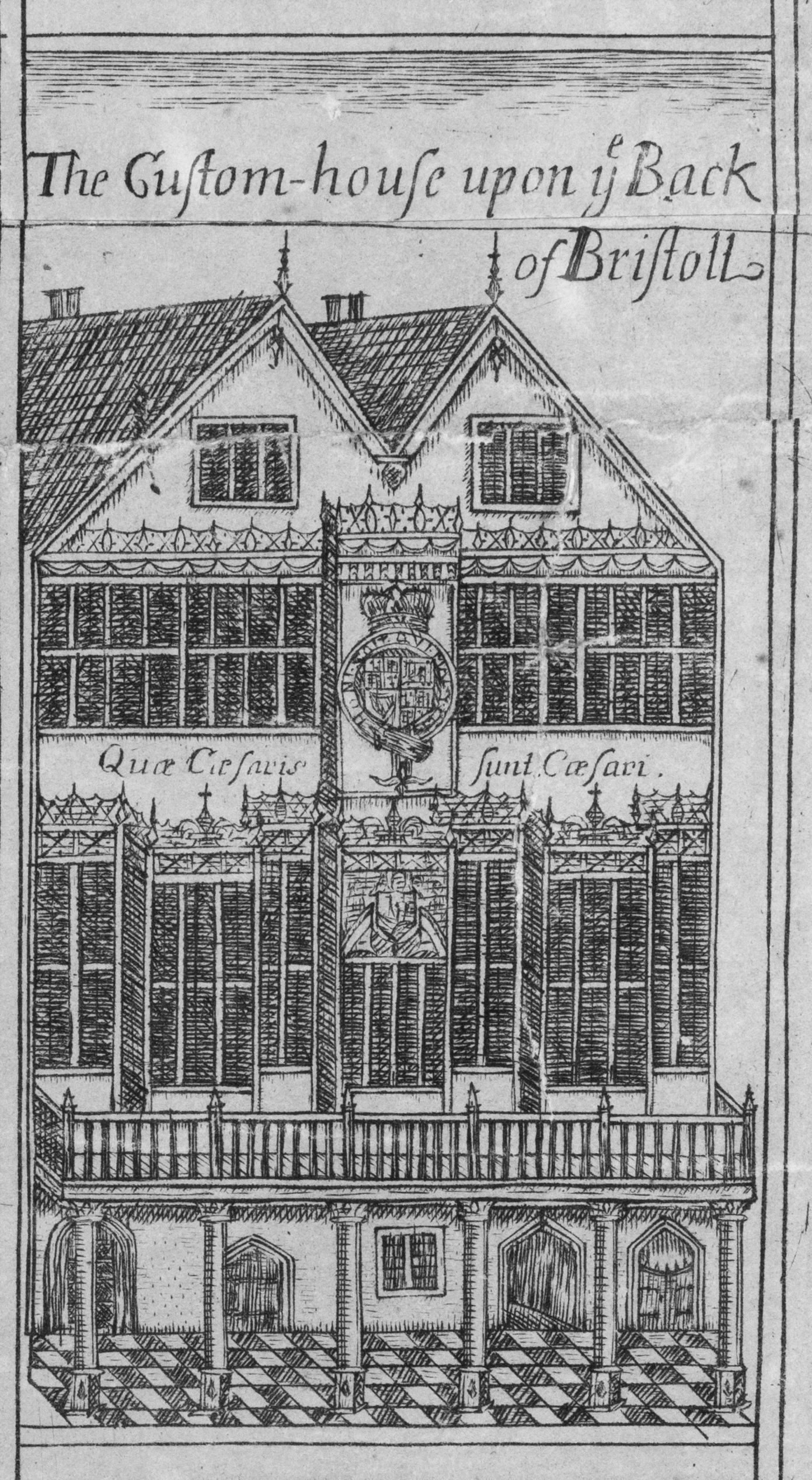
The Custom-house upon the Back of Bristoll, 1673

Bristol was engaged in overseas trade by the 11th century. However, a custom house would have been unnecessary until Edward I implemented a national system for the collection of duties on foreign trade in 1275. This involved the establishment of recognised 'head ports' along the coast of England, each of which had authority over a stretch of coast. In many cases head ports also included 'member ports', which were subject to the chief officers of the head port.

The chief officer in each head port was the 'Customer' (also called 'Collector'). In Bristol, as in most other ports, there were two, exercising office together but under separate grants of authority. He entered goods declared by merchants into his accounts, assessed the duties payable, collected the tax on behalf of the Crown, issued certificates called 'cockets' to merchants as proof of payment and distributed the revenues as directed by the Exchequer. The building used for this work was called the 'custom house'. In later centuries, as trade grew, these could be grand administrative offices, employing hundreds of staff. The Custom House, London, and the Dublin Custom House are well known examples.

The earliest record of an individual building in Bristol called the 'Custom House' dates to 1480. William Worcester's topographical survey of Bristol refers to the King's 'custom hows' several times. This was located near the head of the ' The Key' (quay) of Bristol, close to the end of what is now St Stephen's Street. Worcester's mention of an 'old custom house' on Pylle Street, suggests that this was not the earliest location for the building.

A survey of the Port of Bristol in 1565 revealed that 'no custome house dothe belonge to the saide porte' but the Customer leased a house that 'stondeth very aptelye for the service of the quenes highnes & ys in good reparacion.'

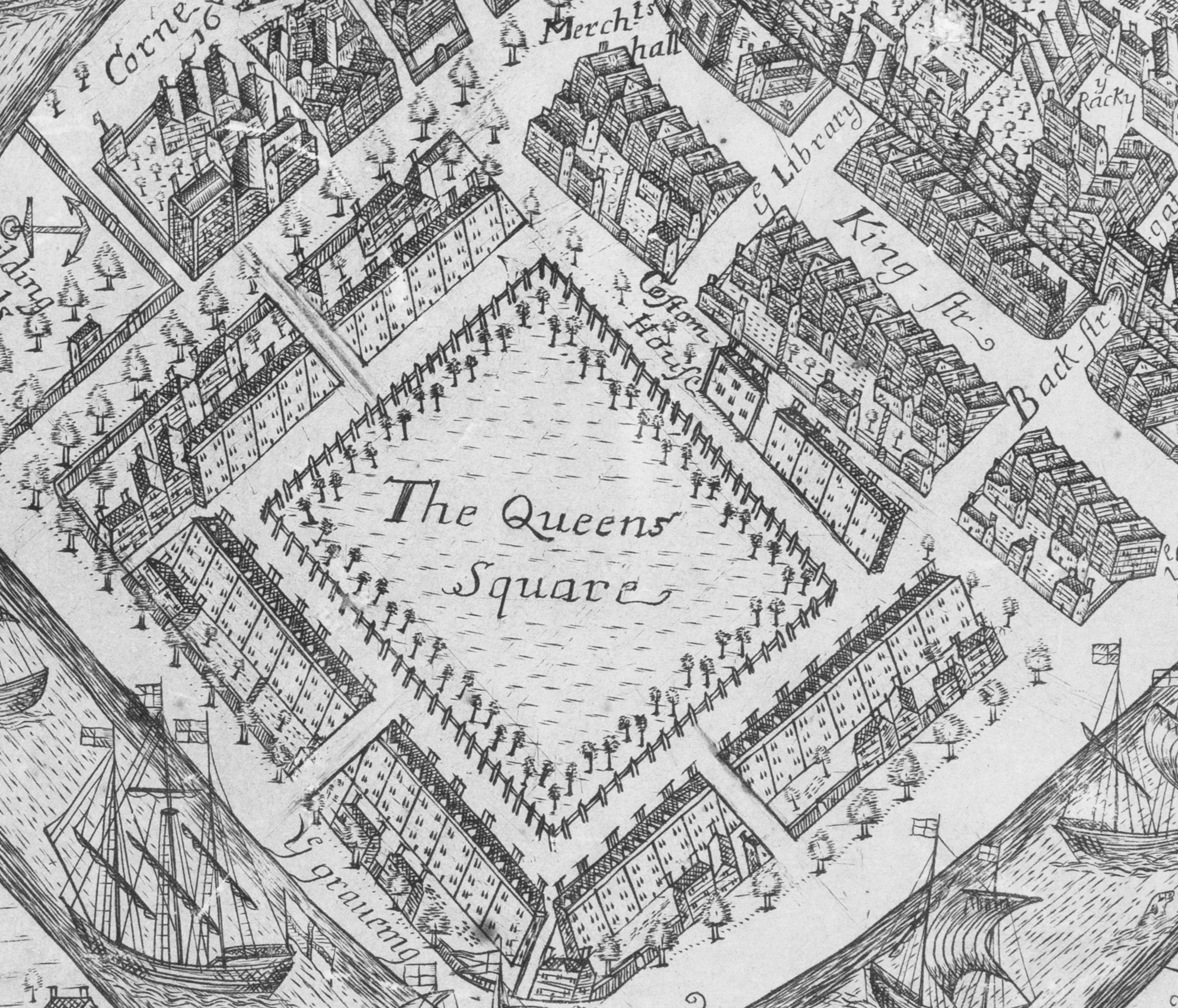
Costom House, Bristol, 1728

By 1583 the 'Custom House' lay on Welsh Back, near Marsh Gate. It was still being 'so used and employed' in 1666. The house is illustrated on James Millerd's 1673 map of Bristol. The inscription on the front of the house reads 'Quae Caesaris sunt Caesari'. This is a variation of the passage from the Vulgate Latin Bible, where Jesus is asked whether it is lawful to pay taxes to the Romans. According the Testament of Matthew and Mark, he responded 'quae sunt Caesaris Caesari' (Mark, 12:17; Matthew, 22:21) i.e. 'render unto Caesar the things that are Caesar's'. In the context of the map, it seems possible this was meant to be a humorous reminder to merchants to pay their customs duties, since Bristol merchants frequently engaged in smuggling. After the Custom House moved to a new building in the early 18th century, the 'old Custom House' continued to be used for accommodation until it was demolished in 1855.

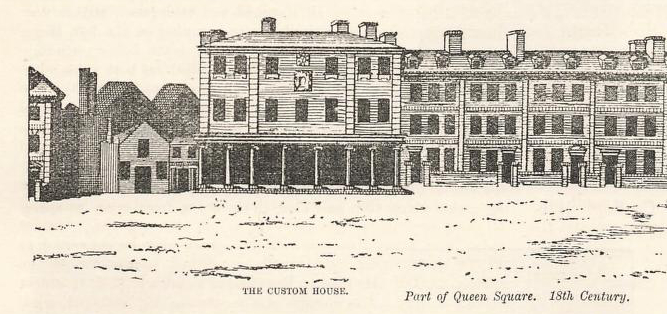
Bristol Custom House in the 18th century

In 1711 a new Custom House was completed on the recently developed Queen Square at a cost of £2,777. It is marked as the 'Custom House' on the revised 1728 edition of James Millerd's map of Bristol and on all subsequent maps up to the present day. An 1818 guide described it as 'a large, brick building, with a piazza in its front, formed of freestone pillars in the Ionic order.' Its employees were not always well regarded, one 18th-century Bristolian referring to its officers as the 'hungry and nimble-handed harpies at the Custom House'. By this time the Custom House had a large staff, including 'weighers', 'gaugers', 'landwaiters' (who checked the loading and unloading of cargoes) and numerous clerks, beside the principal officers and their deputies.

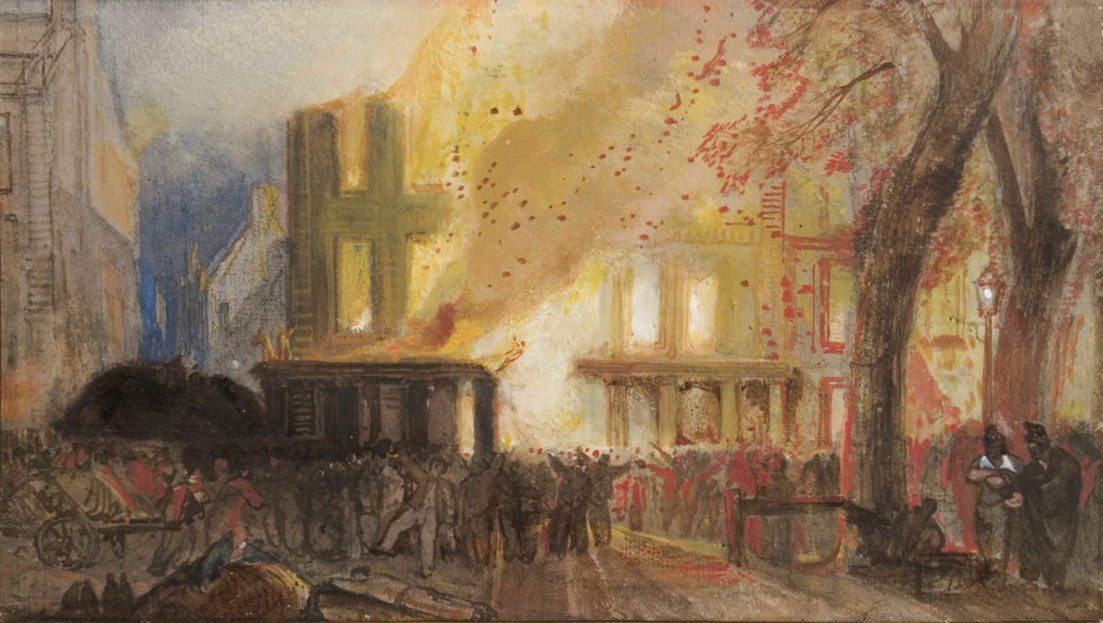
William James Müller, 'Burning of the Custom House 1831', Bristol

The Custom House on Queen Square was burnt down during the Bristol riots of 1831. On 30 October rioters burnt many of the buildings in the square. At least fifty of the rioters were believed to have died in the burning of the Custom House, either because they were plundering upper rooms while the arsonists fired the ground floor, or because they had climbed on to its roof while trying to escape from other burning buildings.

On 22 November 1835, the foundation stone of a new Custom House was laid on the site of the former building. Designed by Sydney Smirke it was completed in 1836. In 1977 it became a listed building. The building is currently an international language centre, but is now closed, pending sale.
