= Thomas Brereton =

British army officer (1782–1832)

- Born: 1782; King's County, Kingdom of Ireland
- Died: January 1832 (aged 49–50); Bristol, England, United Kingdom of Great Britain and Ireland
- Military career
- Allegiance: Great Britain; United Kingdom
- Branch: British Army
- Service years: 1798–1832
- Rank: Lieutenant-Colonel
- Conflicts: French Revolutionary Wars; Napoleonic Wars

Lieutenant-Colonel Thomas Brereton (1782–1832) was an officer of the British Army.

== Career ==
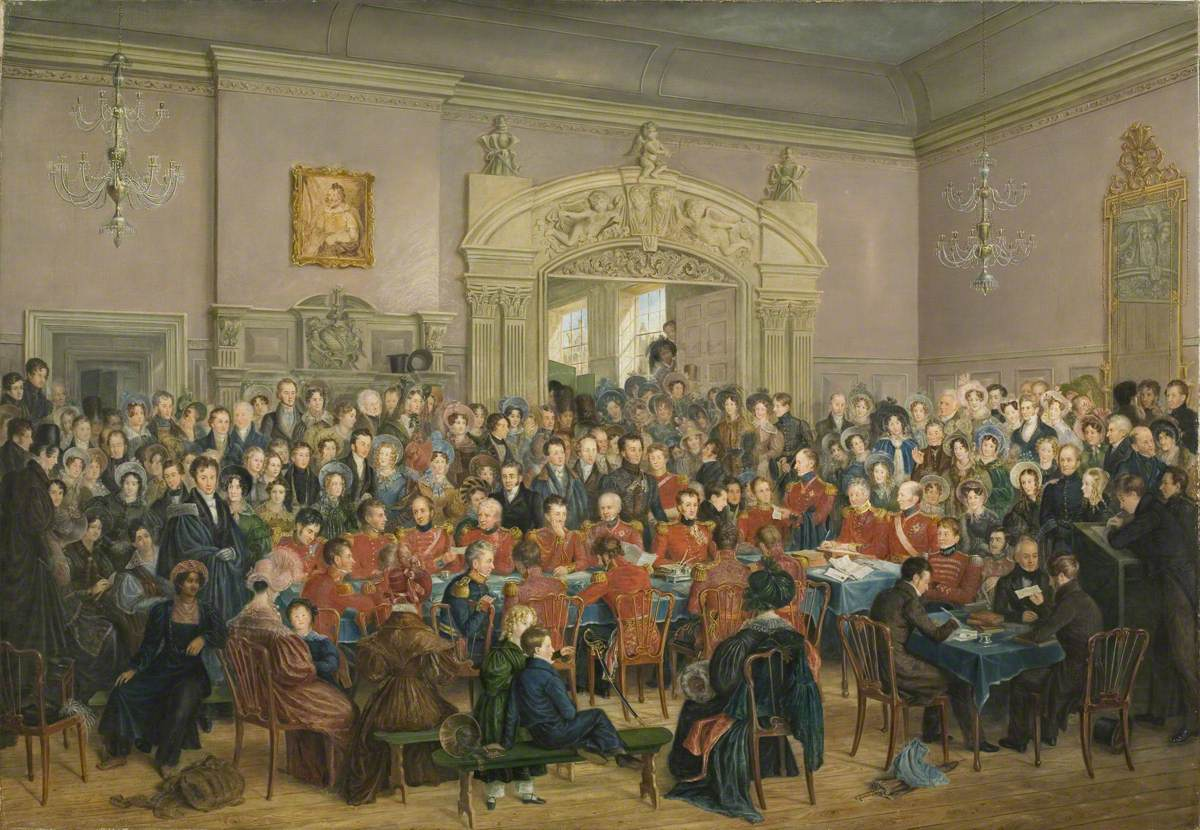
The court-martial of Colonel Brereton

Brereton was descended from Sir William Brereton, Chief Justice and Lord High Marshal of Ireland. He was born in King's County (now County Offaly), Ireland, in 1782. In 1798 he received his commission as an ensign in the 8th West India Regiment; in 1809 he was promoted to Major and served at the capture of Martinique from the French and Guadeloupe the following year. He was appointed brigade major in 1813 for his relative Major General Robert Brereton, Lieutenant-Governor of St. Lucia. He was appointed Lieutenant-Governor of Senegal and Gorée in 1814 and was present during the Méduse tragedy. He was promoted to Lieutenant-Colonel of the Royal African Corps in 1815. In 1819 he was appointed to the command of the Cape Town garrison until 1823, when he retired to England to become Inspecting Field Officer for the Bristol recruiting district.

At the time of the 1831 Reform riots in Bristol he was in charge of the troops. The riots started on the Saturday, 29 October 1831, and lasted for three days. Though Colonel Brereton only lost control on the Sunday due to lack of troops, he still managed to put down the rioting early on Monday morning before the arrival of the reinforcements he had requested. Despite this, he was controversially court-martialled in January 1832, during the course of which he committed suicide. Twice a widower, he died leaving four children.

== Depictions in film ==
The 1978 children's paranormal TV drama The Clifton House Mystery was a ghost story based on the circumstances of Brereton's death. The plot revolved around a family moving into an old house in Bristol, where they find a long-dead skeleton in a hidden room. After some unexplained incidents, they become convinced that a ghost connected in some way with the 1831 Bristol riots is haunting the house. After checking local records, they realize that it is the ghost of a dragoon commander who was court-martialled for his handling of the riots, and who later disappeared without a trace. The ghost is named "George Bretherton" in the TV series. One of his descendants, named "Mrs Betterton", had sold the house to the family, but was allegedly unaware of the hidden room and its contents, referring only to a vague family scandal that happened generations ago.

== Depictions in fiction ==
The 1906 historical novel Chippinge (sometimes Chippinge Borough) by Stanley J. Weyman is based on the background to the 1831 Bristol Riots and culminates in a detailed description of those riots and Colonel Brereton's part in them. The main fiction in that description is that the important role played by Major Digby Mackworth is ascribed to the hero, Arthur Vaughan. Colonel Brereton also appears in part of the early narrative of Allan Mallinson's novel The Passage to India.
