= Thomas Proctor (alderman) =

Nineteenth century British philanthropist

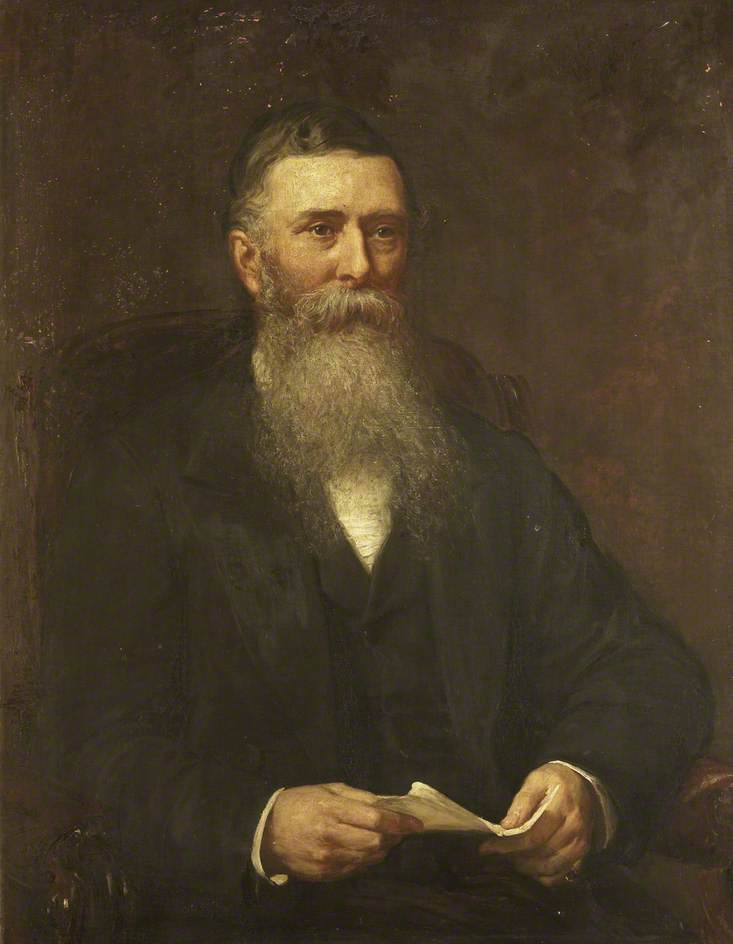
Thomas Proctor (1811–1876), Bristol City Council

Thomas Proctor (1811 – 1876) was an industrialist in Victorian era Bristol, England. He was an alderman of the Bristol corporation, Justice of the Peace and High Sheriff of Bristol. Proctor was known for his philanthropy including his donation of the Mansion House to the city, the restoration of St Mary’s, Redcliffe, urban tree planting, and his gift of a gothic revival drinking fountain in Clifton Downs.

In 2024 Peter Malpass, emeritus professor of housing and urban studies at the University of the West of England, in reviewing a biography of Proctor, concludes: "Proctor was an all-round good person, a model citizen who made a lot of money in business and then put it to work for the benefit of others."

== Life, work and local politics ==
Thomas Proctor was born in Birmingham in 1811 to Thomas and Susanna. He married Mary in 1836 and relocated to Bristol, becoming a partner in the family fertiliser firm H&T Proctor and taking over the company in the same year. Based on Prewett Street, under Thomas Proctor’s management progressed from traditional fertiliser production to synthetic, and diversified to provide agricultural equipment and machinery.

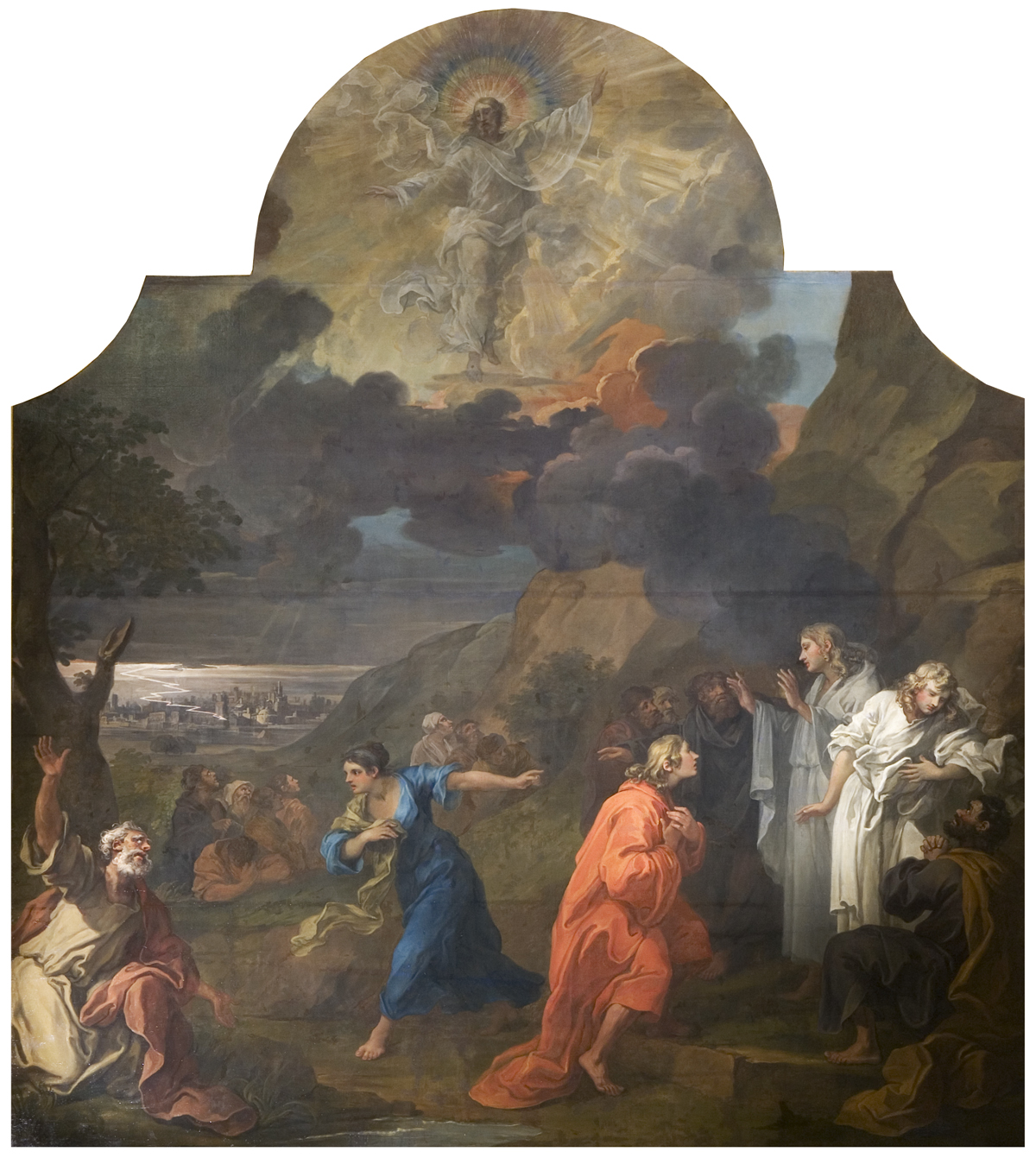
Centre of the Hogarth altarpiece triptych Proctor purchased and donated to keep in public ownership

In 1848 Proctor founded the Canynges Society, named for the philanthropist merchant, as a fundraising vehicle for St Mary's, Redcliffe. Proctor as both anonymous donor "Nil Desperandum" and chair of the restoration committee, "was clearly enjoying himself: for example, in that letter Nil Desperandum begged Proctor to ensure no one but himself read the letters and in October Proctor posted copies of an article in The Builder to himself as Nil Desparandum ... Then there is the praise lavished on Nil Desparandum at a Vestry dinner, carefully conveyed in writing to the generous donor by Proctor a few days later."

In 1853 Proctor was elected an alderman of the Bristol corporation, serving until his death in 1876. Throughout his tenure the post of alderman was attached to an electoral ward but were elected by councillors only, not by the public. Proctor was alderman assigned to All Saints ward from 1857-60 and to Redcliffe ward from 1860 until his death in 1876. During this time Proctor was also appointed a trustee of Dr White’s Charity (1875), Justice of the Peace (1868) and High Sheriff of Bristol (1869). Before his death there were efforts at the corporation to nominate him mayor of Bristol, but Proctor was too ill to accept.

In 1861 Proctor was president of the Colston Society, a philanthropic organisation named for disgraced slave-trader and MP Edward Colston.

Proctor died in 1876 following two apopletic seizures. He was survived by his wife Mary and adopted daughter Mary Eveline. An obelisk at Arnos Vale Cemetery marks the resting place of Proctor and his immediate family. Architectural historan Jon Cannon summarises that on Proctor's death: "there were several commemorative notices and accounts of his funeral in the Bristol press; flags were flown at half mast and many shops and public buildings were closed."

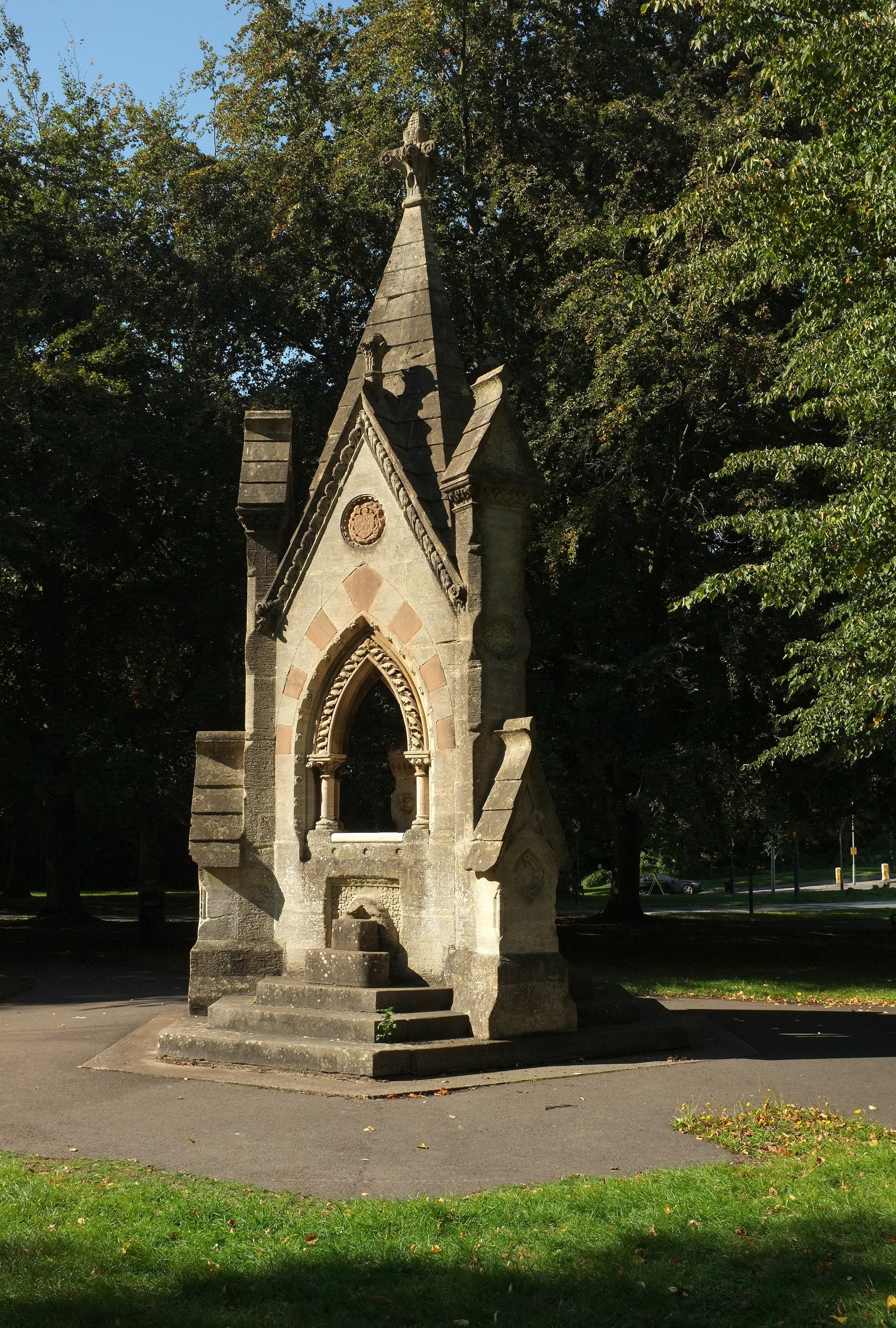
Alderman Proctor's drinking fountain, Clifton Down

== Philanthropy and legacy ==
Proctor chaired the church restoration committee of St Mary’s Redcliffe, where he also served as churchwarden. He made substantial donations to the restoration of the north porch under the name ‘nil desperandum’, remaining anonymous, or perhaps an open secret, until after his death. There is a relief portrait of Proctor at St Mary's, Redcliffe, carrying his alias "Nil Desperandum".

Proctor purchased Hogarth triptych Sealing the Tomb in 1859 and gifted it to the Bristol Fine Arts Academy (now Royal West of England Academy), keeping the work in public ownership. As well as being a benefactor to St Mary’s, Redcliffe, Proctor gave regularly to the now-demolished Emmanuel church on Guthrie Road. Plans for a memorial life-sized effigy of Proctor in St Mary's, Redcliffe, were shelved after apparent intervention by Proctor's surviving relatives.

In spring 1872 Proctor constructed a large water fountain in a gothic revival style to commemorate the transfer of the Clifton Downs from the Society of Merchant Venturers to the Bristol Corporation. The structure retains a plaque honoring Proctor’s gift.

In November 1873 Proctor pledged to meet the costs of lining the riverside path with trees along Coronation Road, beside the new cut between Bath Bridge and Vauxhall Ferry (near present day Vauxhall Bridge); a vote of thanks was passed at the Bristol corporation council meeting. In 1884 Arrowsmith's Dictionary of Bristol added more detail: "the late Alderman Proctor converted the bank into a beautiful boulevard, having at his own expense planted it with some thousands of trees and placed seats at suitable intervals."

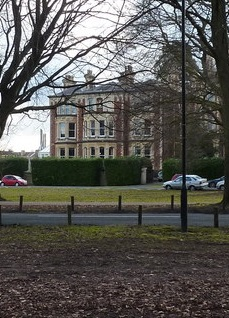
Proctor's home he donated to the city as the mayor's Mansion House

In April 1874 Thomas and Mary Proctor indicated their intention to donate their home, Elmdale House, Clifton Down, to the Bristol corporation for the use of the mayor. Now known as the mansion house it is no longer the official residence of the Lord Mayor of Bristol, being a commercial operation, but is available for use by the Lord Mayor for public and private events. The house contains of bust of Proctor commissioned at his expense. In May 2025 news outlets reported Bristol City Council were considering selling the building.

Latimer records that in June 1875 Proctor donated and equipped a recreation grounds at Fishponds “for the entertainment of school children, some thousands of whom are taken there on yearly summer excursions.” There is modern speculation as to where this park is, as it appears not to be commemorated.

In 1963 post-war flat block Proctor House was built on Prewitt Street, Redcliffe. Proctor House is adjacent to the former Proctor’s Cathay Works, now a Doubletree Hilton hotel, still contains Bristol’s last glass cone used by Proctors for mixing and storage. The successor buildings to Dr White’s Almshouse, of which Proctor was a trustee, now sit adjacent to both.
