= Mansion House, Bristol =

Historic building in Bristol, England

Mansion House
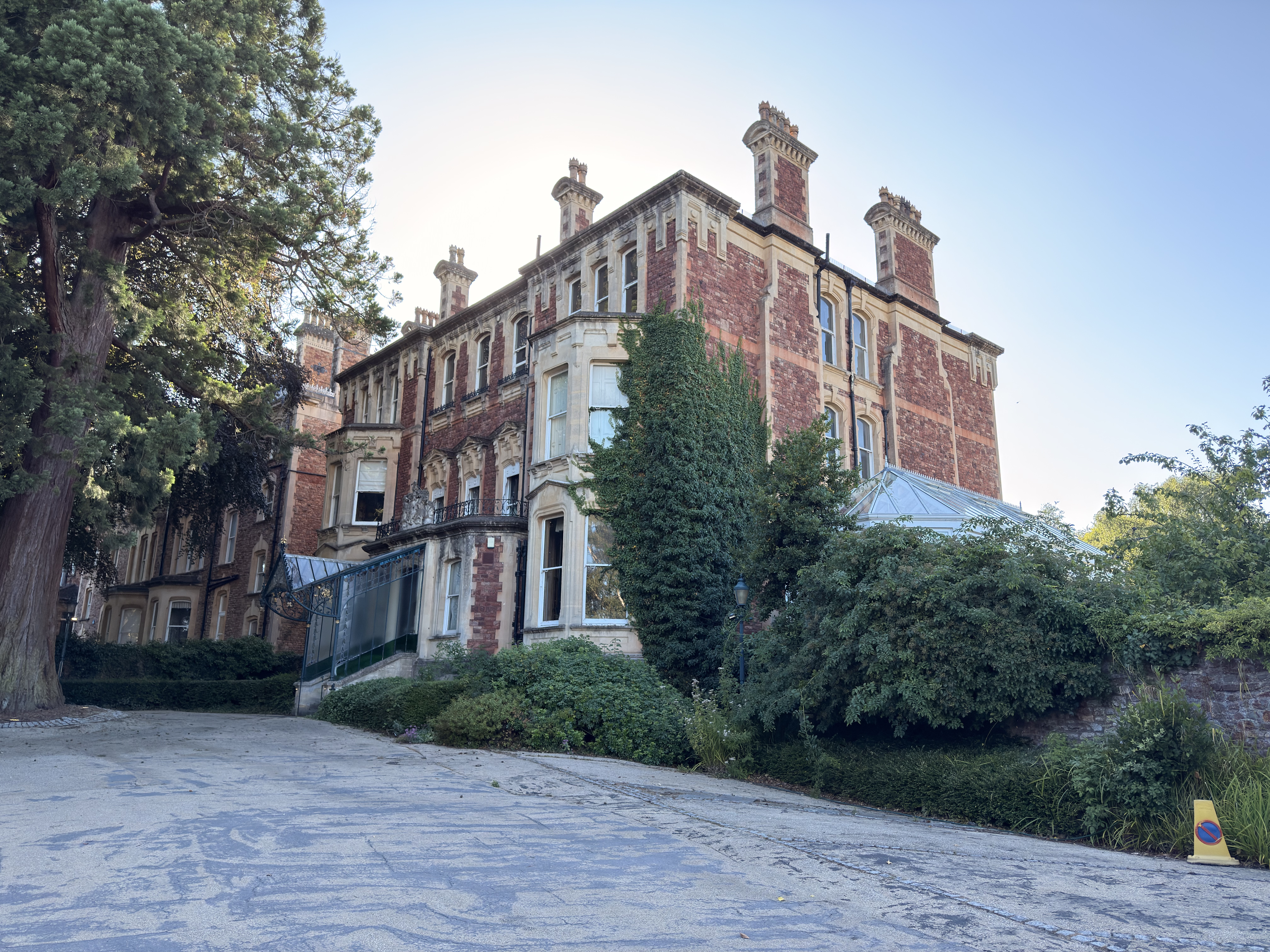
- The Mansion House in 2026

- Shown in Bristol
- 51.4608°N 2.6252°W
- Location: Clifton Down, Bristol

History
- Built: 1867

Site notes
- Architect(s): George and Henry Godwin
- Architectural style: Renaissance style

The Mansion House is a municipal building on Clifton Down, Bristol, England. It is the official residence of the Lord Mayor of Bristol.

== History ==
The first mansion house in Bristol was erected in Queen Square in 1783. A carriage carrying the anti-reform judge Charles Wetherell and the mayor Charles Pinney was attacked on 29 October 1831 and they sought refuge in the mansion house. The 14th Light Dragoons sought to protect the house and Wetherell and Pinney escaped, but ultimately the house was stormed by rioters, looted and burnt to the ground during the subsequent rioting. A second mansion house was established on Great George Street shortly thereafter but this was closed following the cut-backs associated with Municipal Corporations Act 1835.

The current building was commissioned as a private house by Alderman Thomas Proctor, who was the proprietor of a fertiliser business. The site he selected became available when the Society of Merchant Venturers donated Clifton Down to Bristol Corporation in 1861. Alderman Proctor's Drinking Fountain, on the green opposite the house, commemorates the donation of the land.

The new house, which was originally known as "Elmdale", was designed by George and Henry Godwin in the Renaissance style, built in red brick with stone finishings and was completed in 1867. The design of the three-storey building involved a symmetrical main frontage of three bays facing onto Clifton Down. The central bay, which was slightly projected forward, featured large semi-circular bay windows on the ground floor and first floor, while the outer bays featured more conventionally sized bay windows. The second floor was fenestrated by tri-partite windows in all three bays. At roof level, there was a cornice with huge stone modillions. Internally, the principal room was the main reception room on the first floor which was 27 feet (8.2 m) long and 27 feet (8.2 m) wide. Proctor gave the house to Bristol Corporation in May 1874, at the suggestion of his wife, shortly before he died in 1876. The building subsequently served as lodgings for visiting judges and as the official residence of the Lord Mayor of Bristol.

Works of art in the mansion house include a portrait by Thomas Lawrence of the former member of parliament, Richard Hart Davis, a portrait by Walter William Ouless of the former mayor, Christopher James Thomas, and a landscape painting by John Syer depicting St Mary Redcliffe.
