= Tolzey Court =

English court

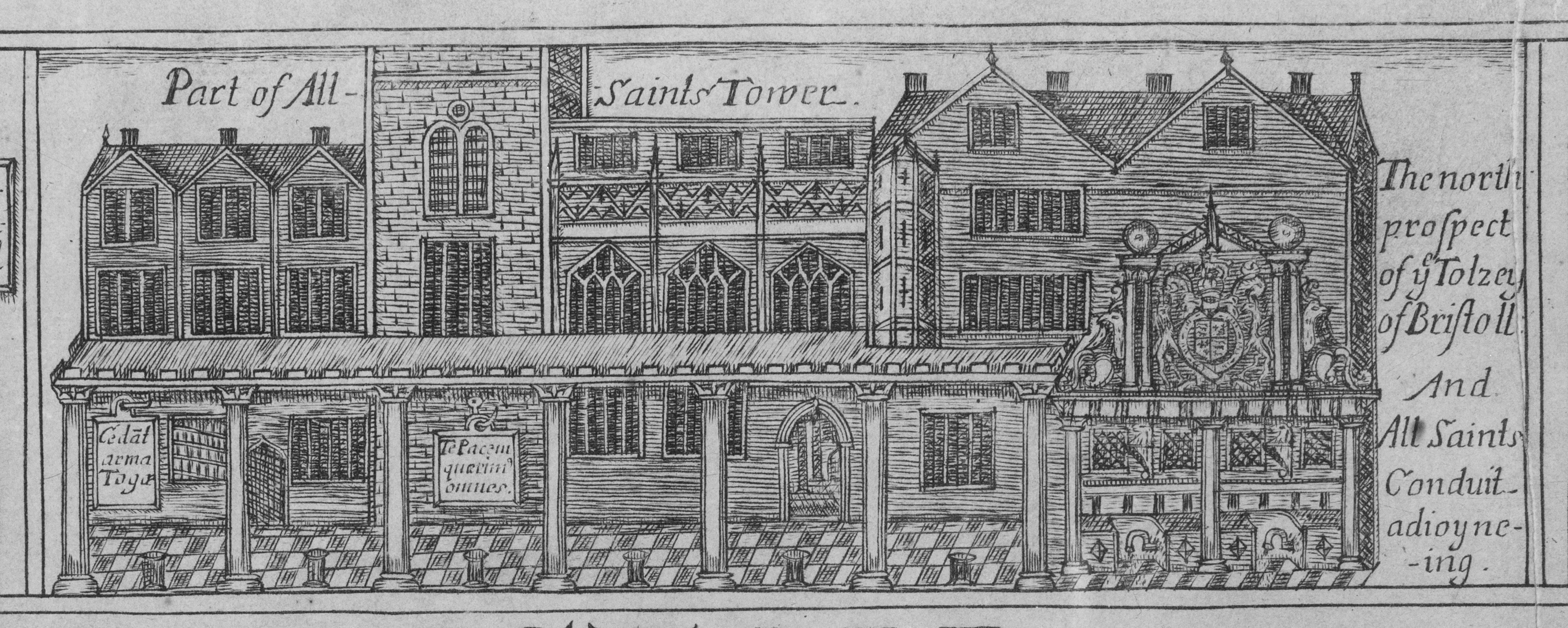
North prospect of the Tolzey of Bristol 1673

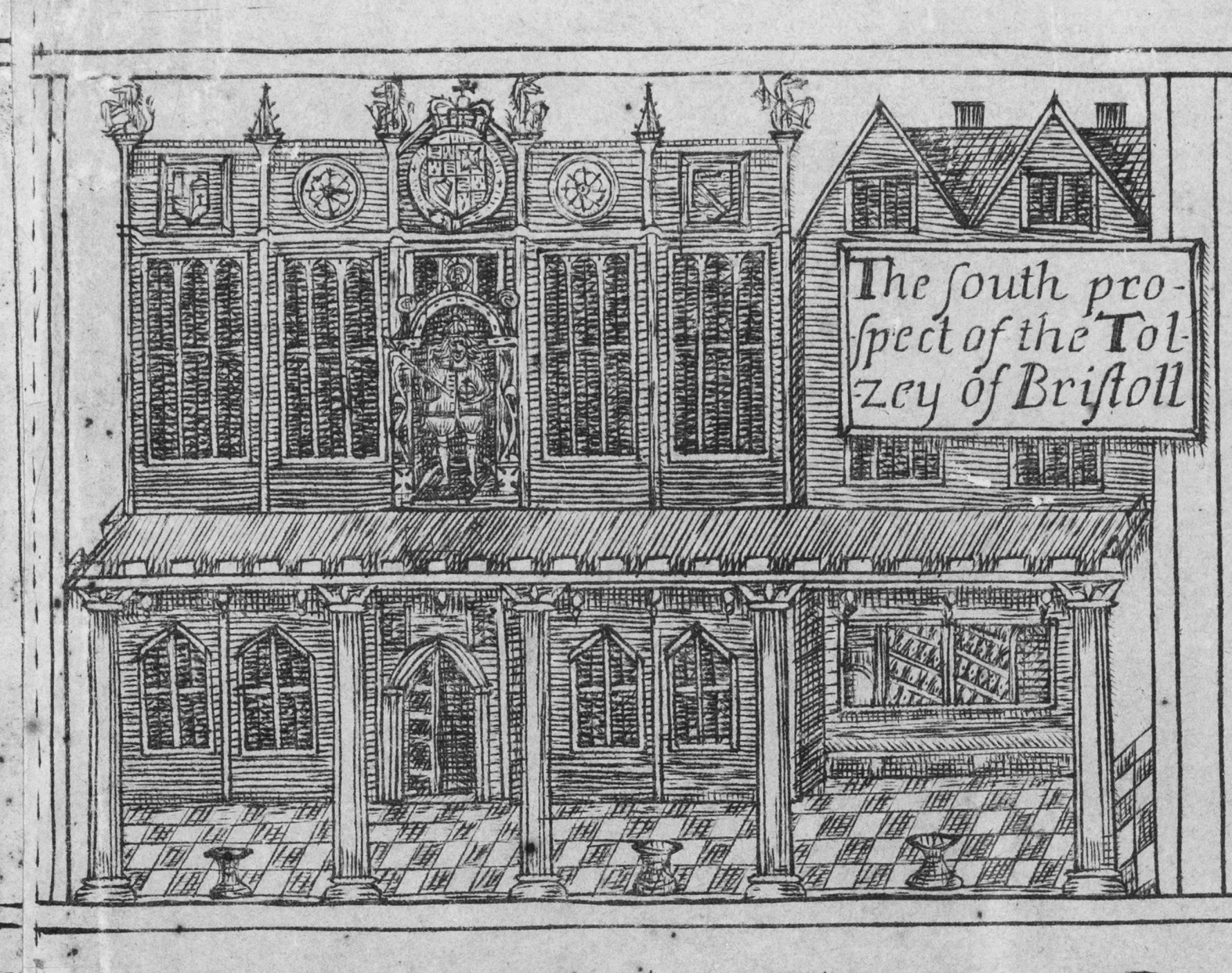
The South prospect of the Tolzey of Bristoll 1673

The Tolzey Court was a court with civil jurisdiction that was held in the English city of Bristol. First mentioned in 1344, it may have developed out of the borough hundred court. It was originally held in a room on Corn Street but later moved to the Bristol Guildhall on Broad Street. The court absorbed the Mayor's Court and at least one of Bristol's court of piepowders.

The Tolzey Court was limited in jurisdiction to actions arising in Bristol or its liberties and could award costs with no upper limit. It was valued by plaintiffs for its use of some aspects of lex mercatoria law, including the ability to try cases in the absence of a defendant and apply the principle of foreign attachment to recover costs from defendant's debtors. In the Victorian era it commonly used juries, which were otherwise unusual in civil trials. The Tolzey Court became popular in the 1960s as its fees were lower than the High Court or county court. It was prevented from hearing repossession cases by the Protection from Eviction Act 1964 and abolished by the Courts Act 1971.

== Origins ==
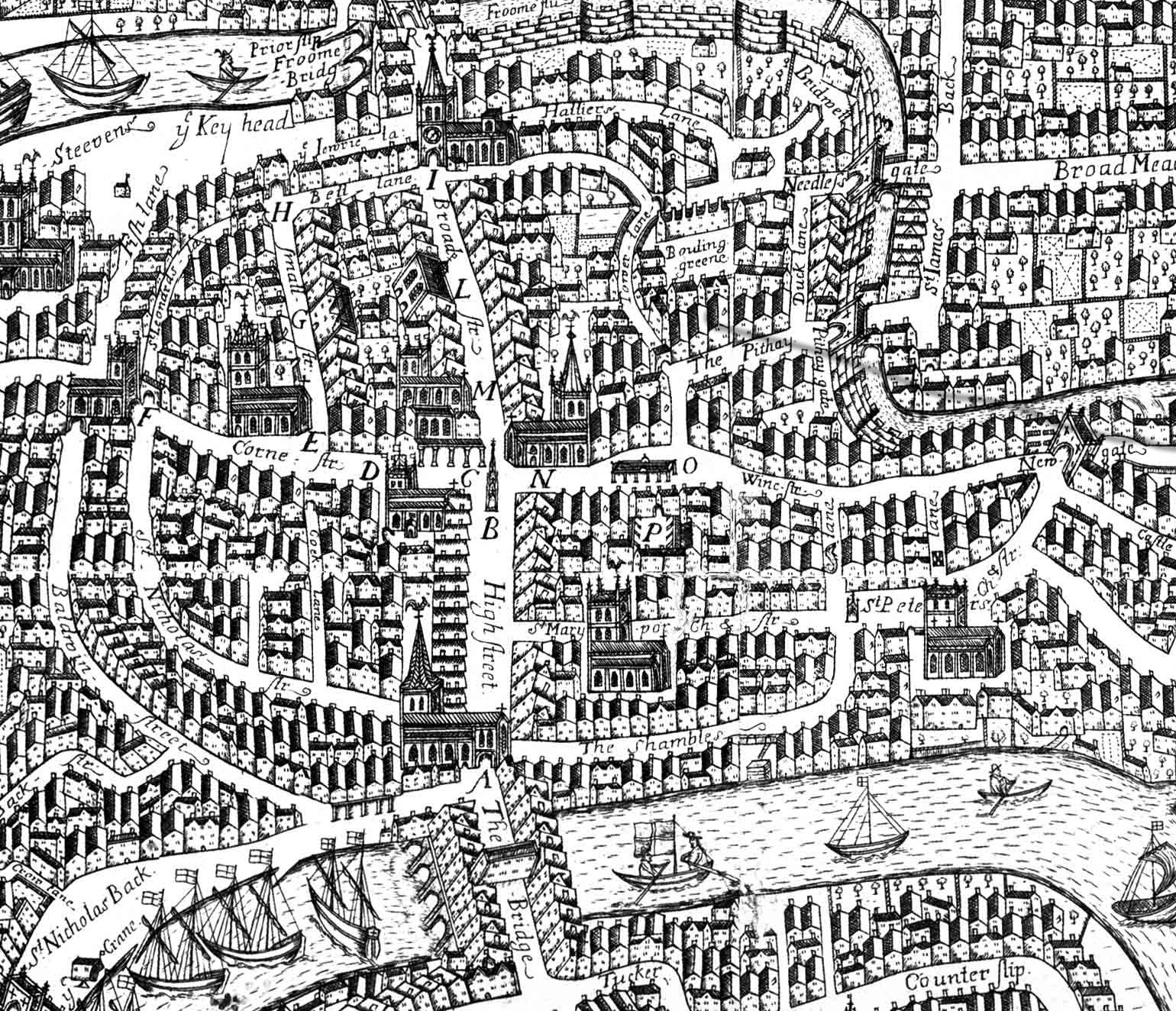
A 1673 map of Bristol. Corn Street runs left from the crossroads (south-west) and Broad Street upwards (north-west).

The Tolzey Court is said to have originated in the Anglo-Saxon period but is first mentioned by name in 1344. It was possibly a development of the borough's original hundred court, which was confirmed in its jurisdiction by the Bristol town charter of 1188. The Tolzey Court was mentioned by a charter of 1373 that granted additional powers to the Mayor's Court, without affecting the jurisdiction of the Tolzey Court. The Tolzey Court is named after a room in a building on Corn Street used for the collection of tolls, and where it presumably first sat, though for much of the medieval era and later it sat in the Bristol Guildhall on Broad Street. The earliest surviving record of a case in the Tolzey Court held by the National Archives is one relating to rent of a house in Broad Street in 1476.

By the 15th century the hundred court was in decline and the Tolzey Court sat more frequently, often sitting 3-5 times a week. During the town's three annual fair weeks the court did not sit, as a court of piepowders tried offences occurring at the markets. Later at least one of the piepowders courts was merged into the Tolzey Court. The Mayor's Court was merged with the Tolzey Court in the mid-18th century.

== Jurisdiction and procedure ==
The court had jurisdiction over civil disputes where the action leading to the dispute arose within the boundaries of Bristol, or its liberties. In 1450 an ordinance defined the work of the Bristol courts. The Tolzey Court was to have jurisdiction over all civil matters except those relating to the export of wool, hides and lead which were to be tried at the Court of Staple and in matters of trespass and deceit where the Mayor's Court had jurisdiction. Bristol was one of the few places, London being another, whereby the King's Justices were excluded from jurisdiction (in Bristol this was by a 1373 charter). The Tolzey Court was therefore entitled to claim precedence over the King's Courts for matters arising within its area. The Tolzey Court was a court of record and was able to order costs as it saw fit, not being bound by an upper limit.

The court was originally presided over by the bailiffs of the hundred but when Bristol became a royal residence the court was probably united with that of the palace and presided over by a seneschal or steward of the royal household. It later came under a sheriff and, after their number was increased to two by Henry VII, the court became known as the Sheriffs' Court. The court was probably brought under the control of the Common Council of Bristol by a 1461 charter of Edward IV.

The court was attended by a legal officer known as a prothonotary, who probably played a similar role to that of a modern registrar. The court was authorised by four sergeants at mace, officers who carried out the court's orders, though these only had powers within the area of the court's jurisdiction.

The court was popular for its adaptability in procedure when compared with common law courts. By the 13th century it had adopted some aspects of lex mercatoria (law merchant) law. In particular it allowed judgements to be made against absent defendants which was not possible under the common law. It also adopted the principle of foreign attachment under which action could be taken to recover costs from debtors of defendants. This was particularly useful where defendants had no recoverable property within the court's jurisdiction and was described by the 1830 prothonotary as a great advantage to citizens of the town. In cases where the defendant had no property in the court's jurisdiction they, if present, could be detained ahead of trial.

== Post-1835 reform ==
The court was reformed by the Municipal Corporations Act 1835. The city's sheriff was designated as the presiding officer of the court, though he took no part in the proceedings. The city recorder became the judge of the court and the prothonotary was renamed the registrar. It was common after this time for juries to be used by the court, unusual in civil trials in England and Wales, though this was limited by the Juries Act 1918.

The court survived in use well into the 20th-century perhaps because of the usefulness of the law merchant and foreign attachment procedures. During the 1960s the court saw a surge in popularity as its court fees were lower than those charged in the High Court or county court; in the first half of 1962 some 275 actions were commenced in the Tolzey Court. Around this time it became a popular court for landlords' cases, though this ceased when the Protection from Eviction Act 1964 limited repossession actions to the county court. The Tolzey Court was abolished by the Courts Act 1971 and its last hearing took place on 3 December 1971, a claim for repairs to the roof of a house, and was presided over by Recorder Joseph Malony. Many of the court records are held in the Bristol Record Office.
