= Firkin Brewery =

Chain of pubs in the United Kingdom

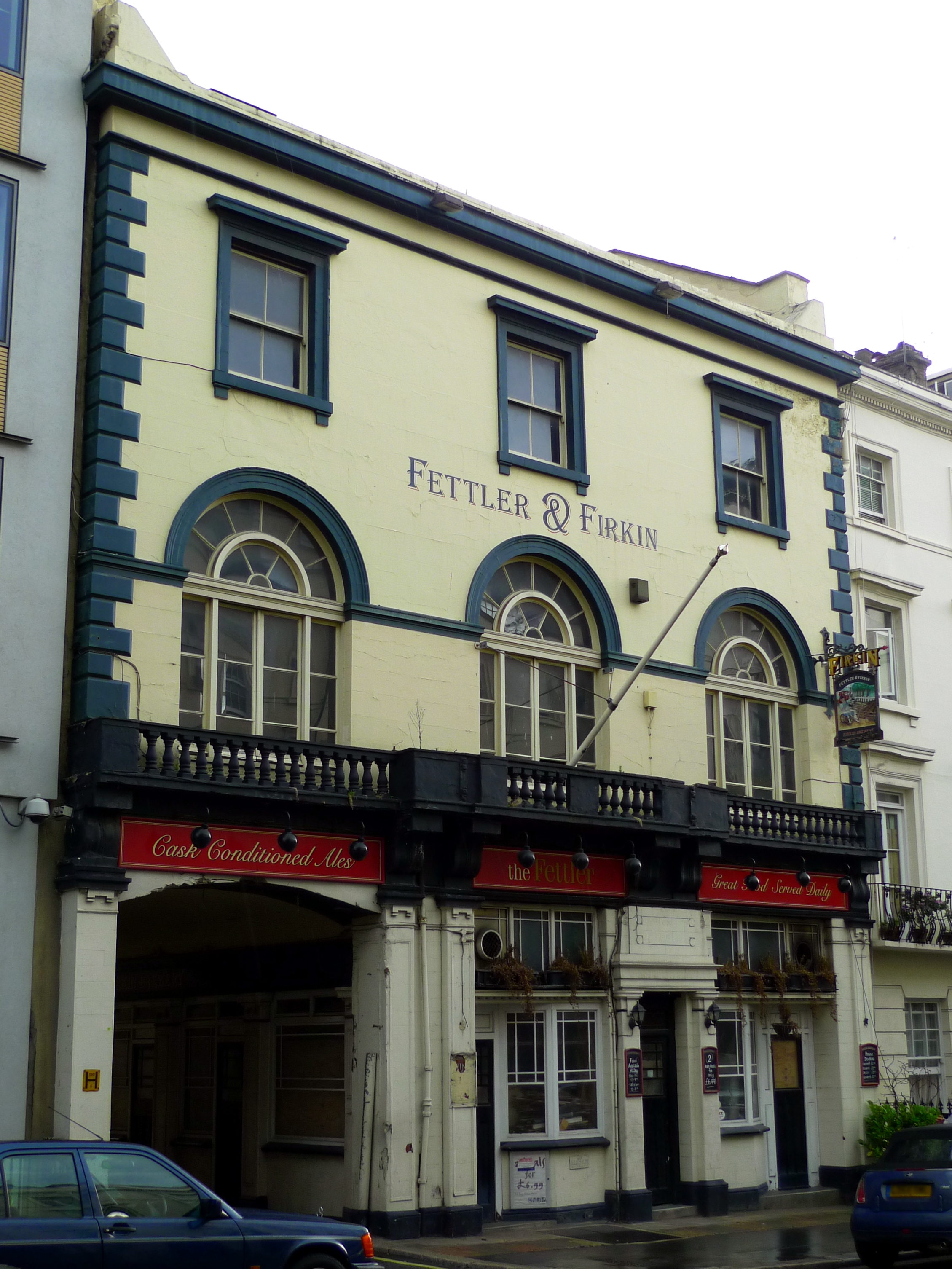
- The Fettler and Firkin in Paddington, London (now converted to residential)
- Type: Brewery
- Closed: March 2001
- Key people: David Bruce
- Parent: Punch Taverns

The Firkin Brewery was a chain of pubs in the United Kingdom. The original UK chain is now defunct, but a number of pubs operate under the Firkin name in other countries. The chain took its name from the firkin, an old English unit of volume.

== History ==
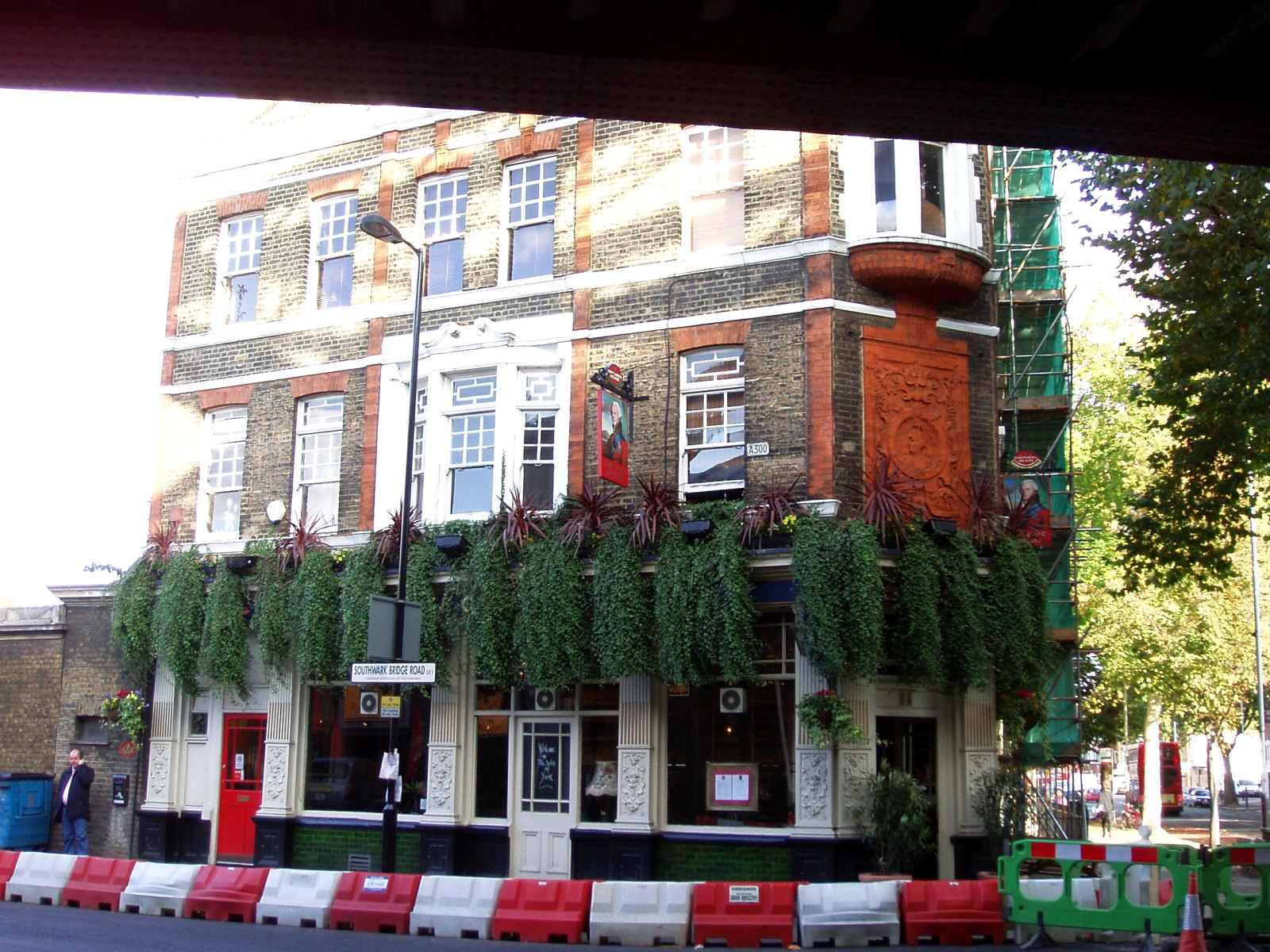
Goose and Firkin, the first Firkin in 1979 on Borough Road

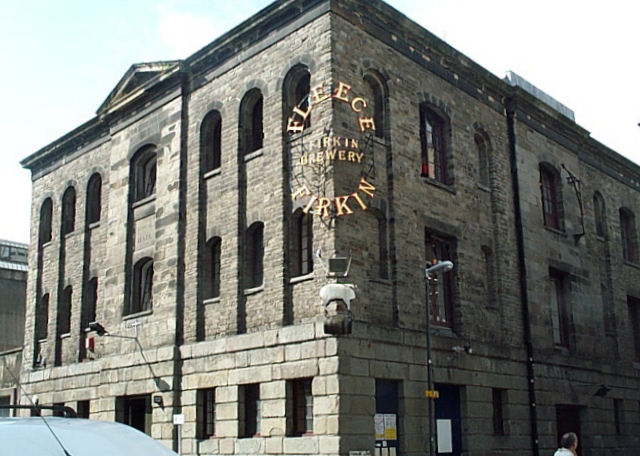
The Fleece and Firkin in Bristol opened in 1982 as the first Firkin pub outside of London.

The chain was established in 1979 by David Bruce as Bruce's Brewery, the Firkin Brewery grew as a chain of mostly brewpubs offering cask ale. It was acquired by Midsummer Leisure in 1988, Stakis Leisure in 1990 and then by Allied Domecq in 1991; by 1995 the chain had 44 pubs, 19 of which brewed beer on site. In 1999, Punch Taverns bought the entire chain and the rights to the Firkin brand, and then sold 110 of the pubs to Bass, leaving 60 Firkin pubs under Punch ownership. The brewery side of the chain was wound up, and in March 2001 Punch announced that the Firkin brand was to be discontinued.

After several corporate restructurings, most of the Bass sites ended up in the Mitchells and Butlers pub company formed in 2003. Many have been rebranded as O'Neill's, Scream, or Goose pubs; the Scream and Goose sites were among those sold to Stonegate Pub Company in 2010. Some of the Punch Taverns-owned Firkins were rebranded as Mr Q's or Bar Room Bar pubs. A small handful of establishments still retain the Firkin branding, distinctive because they all followed the same naming convention. The format was generally The ---- and Firkin, where ---- was a word, beginning with either "F" or "Ph", which had some connection to the pub building or to the local area.

The Firkin Brewery also gave out T-shirts for anyone who managed at least 12 pubs in the Firkin Crawl. A "passport", issued by the Brewery, would be filled with a stamp from each pub visited, and public transport directions to the nearest pub in the crawl would also be in the "passport". Although there was no stipulation in the rules that the 12 pubs had to be completed on the same day, this was often the goal of participants.

== Firkin pubs outside the UK ==
=== North America ===
Firkin pubs in Canada and the United States operate under the Firkin Group of Pubs franchise, a chain of English theme pubs founded in southern Ontario in 1987. The naming scheme for the pubs is similar to that of the UK chain (for example, "The Crown and Firkin", in Whitby, Ontario), and many Firkin Group pubs in fact share their names with former UK Firkin Brewery pubs. In the United States, the franchise pubs are named with "Firkin" first, as in "The Firkin & Fox" as opposed to "The Fox & Firkin".

=== Australia ===
A number of independent English-style pubs in Australia use "Firkin" in their names, such as the Firkin and Hound in Alice Springs.
