= Merchant Hall =

Country house in Bristol, England

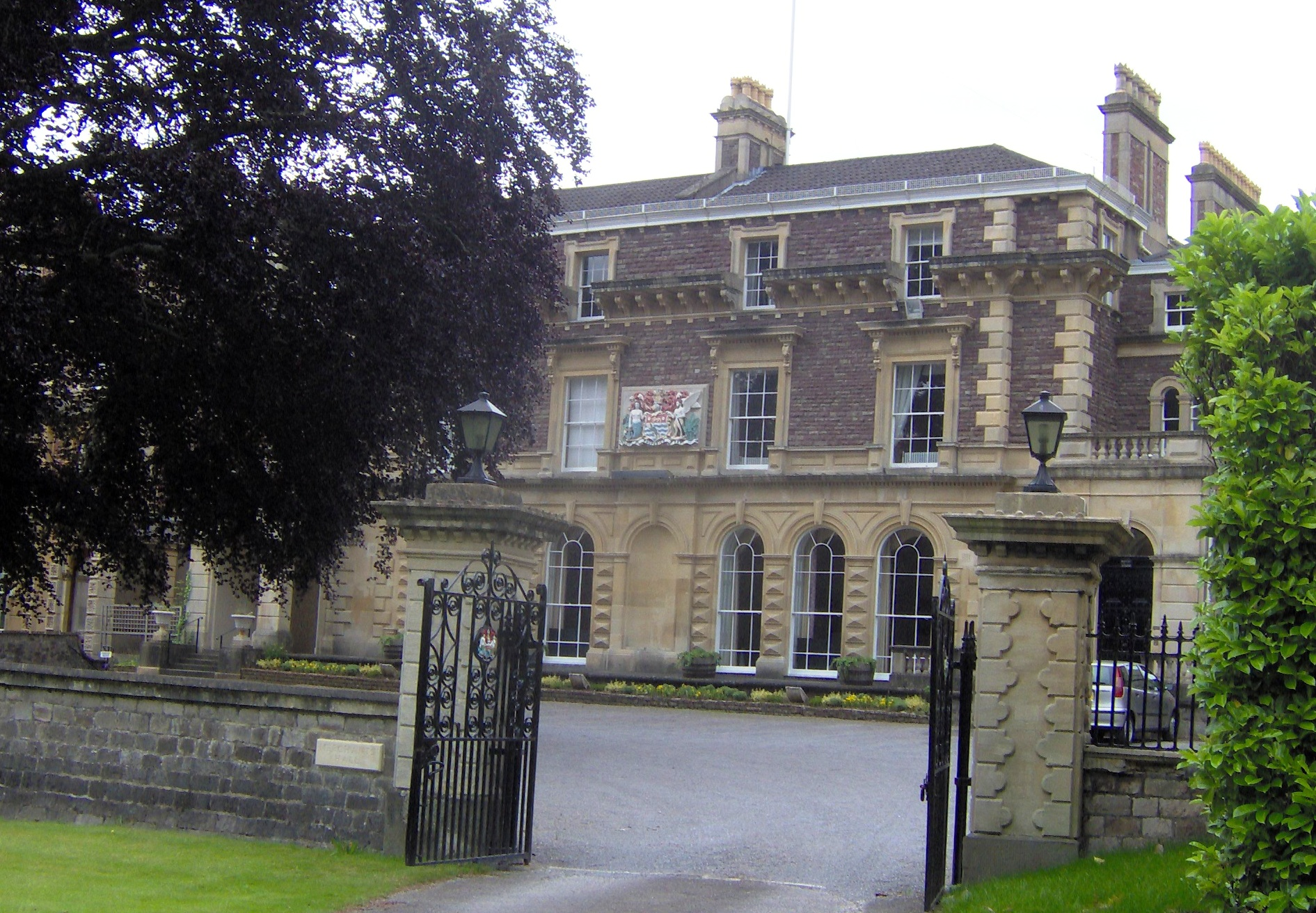

- Location within Bristol

General information
- Location: Bristol, England
- Coordinates: 51.459367°N 2.626425°W
- Completed: 1868

Design and construction
- Architects: Richard Shackleton Pope and Bindon

The Merchant Hall (grid reference ST565735) is a historic building on The Promenade, Clifton Down, Bristol, England.

It was built in 1868 by Richard Shackleton Pope, Thomas Pope and John Bindon and converted after World War II for the Society of Merchant Venturers, whose original hall in central Bristol was destroyed during the Bristol Blitz.

It has been designated by English Heritage as a grade II listed building.
