= Michael Becher =

- Born: 6 January 1704; Bristol, England
- Died: 18 December 1758 (aged 54); Bristol, England
- Occupation: Merchant

Michael Becher (6 January 1704 – 18 December 1758) was a Bristol-born English slave trader and merchant. Becher was from an established Bristol commercial family, and he took over his father's slave trading firm

== Early life ==
Becher was born on 6 January 1704 in Bristol, England to parents John Becher and Hester Duddlestone. He was one of eight children, though only four survived to adulthood.

He died on 18 December 1758 at the age of 54. He was buried in St. Marks, Bristol, England.

== Career ==
Michael Becher was part of an established Bristol commercial family and took over his father's slave trading firm. His interests were in the West Indies trade, between 1727-1749 and 1754-1757. His ships participated in nineteen slave trading voyages between 1727 and 1753. Becher was the primary owner of all fourteen vessels. The slave sales that Becher completed from 1731 to 1740 took place mainly in Jamaica. According to Voyages: The Trans-Atlantic Slave Trade Database, overall, Michael Becher trafficked 6,205 humans from Africa to points in the Caribbean and the American mainland during his slave trading career; 16.3% would die in transit. In 1736, Becher was elected Warden of the Society of Merchant Venturers in Bristol, and in 1749 he served as Master.

== Notable voyages ==
=== Swallow ===
One of the most prominent voyages that Michael Becher and company attempted occurred in 1741. The ship for this voyage was named the Swallow. The voyage was to go from Bristol, England, to Virginia. On day 3 of the voyage, however, the ship was likely pirated by Spanish Privateers. The ship was reported lost on the Lloyds List and seen carried into San Sabastian, Spain. Documents proved the vessel to be worth £4,200.

=== Peniel ===
The ship that was used for the voyage of 1727 was named the Peniel. The voyage was between Great Britain and Africa. The vessel was owned by Michael Becher. The ship landed in Africa at an unknown port and delivered the slaves to Jamaica. There were 271 slaves that were on board the ship when it left the dock. Of the 271 slaves that were on board, only 217 slaves survived the voyage. The mortality rate was 19%. The captains of the vessel were James Crichton and Benjamin Tanner. The crew consisted of 6 men. On the ship, there were 6 guns mounted for defense

=== Hobhouse ===
Another voyage that the firm completed in 1737 was on a ship named the Hobhouse. The voyage started in Great Britain and landed in an unknown port in Africa. There were 363 slaves on the ship when it left the dock. Only 310 slaves survived the voyage. The mortality rate was 15%. The captain of the vessel was John Bartlett. There were 37 crew members in the first half of the voyage, and on the second half, only 33 crew members were left. On the ship, there were 12 guns mounted for defense .
