= Wool Hall, Bristol =

Historic building in St Thomas Street, Redcliffe, Bristol

The Wool Hall
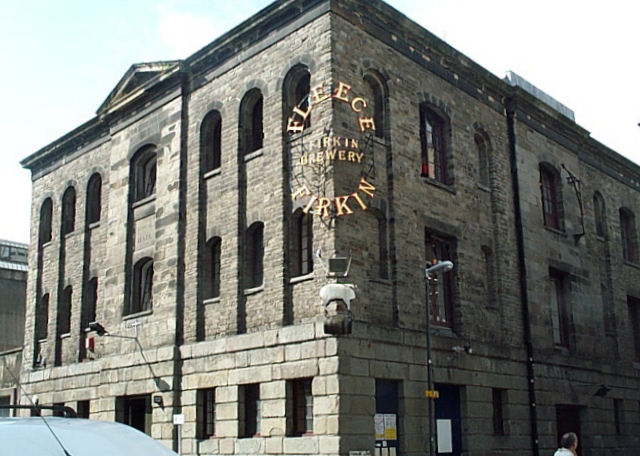

- Location within Bristol

General information
- Architectural style: Neoclassical
- Location: Bristol, England
- Coordinates: 51.4522°N 2.5894°W
- Completed: 1830
- Cost: £4400

Design and construction
- Architect: Richard Shackleton Pope

The Wool Hall is a historic building in St Thomas Street, Redcliffe, Bristol. Originally built as a market hall, today it is home to The Fleece, a pub and live music venue.

== History ==
Bristol Markets Act 1828
- Act of Parliament
- Parliament of the United Kingdom
- Long title: An Act for removing the present Cattle Market now held in Saint Thomas Street in the City of Bristol, for providing a better and more convenient Market instead thereof, and for rebuilding and enlarging the Wool Hall in Saint Thomas Street.
- Citation: 9 Geo. 4. c. xli

Dates
- Royal assent: 13 May 1828

Text of statute as originally enacted

The wool trade had been important in Bristol since the 11th century, but the smell generated by fullers softening wool in urine meant the trade was banished from the city centre and relocated in Redcliffe.

The building was constructed in 1830 to house the city's wool market, as Bristol Bridge had become too congested by sheep farmers travelling across it. It was designed by Richard Shackleton Pope and has been described as "the first quasi-industrial building in Bristol to attempt a real architectural facade". It was designed in a classical style with a symmetrical front. Internally, the building included a Pennant-flagged ground floor and staircase. The ground floor served as a weighing house, while the upper floors were used for storage. The total cost was £4,400 (now £415,900). The building was not a success since it was too far from the farmer's markets at Temple Meads, and the wool trade moved to the Corn Exchange in 1834.

The building survived the bombing of Bristol during World War II, unlike several nearby 17th-century buildings which were hit and subsequently demolished. In 1980, the building was modified to include new doors. The ground floor became a pub, while the upper floors were offices.

The Wool Hall was awarded grade II listed building status by English Heritage in 1975.

== The Fleece ==
The Fleece was opened as a brewpub in 1982 by Firkin Brewery, originally named The Fleece and Firkin.

The Fleece became a 330-capacity venue for live music, hosting gigs by Oasis, Pulp, Emeli Sande, Radiohead and Amy Winehouse.

After the Firkin Brewery brand passed through a number of pub companies, Mitchells & Butlers sold the lease in 2010 to Chris Sharp of the band The Blue Aeroplanes, who increased the venue's capacity to 450 and as of 2021 continues to operate it as an independent venture.

== See also ==
- Grade II listed buildings in Bristol
- Firkin Brewery
