= The William Shakespeare =

Defunct British train

Overview
- Service type: Passenger train
- First service: 3 May 1951
- Last service: 8 September 1951
- Former operator: British Railways

Route
- Termini: London Paddington; Wolverhampton / Stratford-upon-Avon
- Service frequency: Daily
- Lines used: Great Western Main Line; Greenford branch line Chiltern Main Line; Leamington–Stratford line

The William Shakespeare was a named train of British Railways. It only ran for a single summer, from 3 May to 8 September 1951.

Together with The Merchant Venturer, this was one of two excursions from London on the Western Region, as part of the Festival of Britain. Both of them ran from London with timings intended for a day out from the capital, to some of the cultural highlights that were the focuses of the festival. For the William Shakespeare this was Stratford-upon-Avon; The Merchant Venturer ran to Bristol and Weston-super-Mare. Both of them used new Mark 1 carriages painted in British Railways' carmine and cream livery.

The William Shakespeare operated from London Paddington to Wolverhampton, with a through portion of four carriages attached and detached at Leamington Spa for William Shakespeare's home of Stratford-upon-Avon. The main section left London at 10:10 and returned from Stratford and Wolverhampton at 19:23 and 19:50 respectively. Unusually for a named express, it was hauled on some occasions by Class 5100 tank engine, although only on the Leamington Spa to Stratord-upon-Avon part of the journey.

== Service ==
Although intended as a Summer service, it began earlier, with the opening of the festival at the start of May. The rest of the summer timetable did not begin until July, even later than usual, due to the rationing measures still in force.

Partly due to poor promotion, as it did not even appear in the main timetable for two months, the service was unsuccessful and only ran for four months. The Merchant Venturer was more successful, and ran for ten years, until 1961.
