= Isaac Hobhouse =

Isaac Hobhouse (1685 – 1763) was an English slave trader, merchant, and member of the Society of Merchant Venturers. Based in Bristol, he was at the centre of money, trade, and credit and acquired much of his fortune through the trade and exploitation of African slaves in the 18th century.

== Early life ==
Hobhouse, the youngest of four children, was born in 1685 in Minehead, Somerset, England to John Hobhouse and Anne Maddox. In the seventeenth century, the Hobhouse family worked as shipwrights and mariners in Minehead. Shortly after his father died, Isaac Hobhouse became interested in Bristol and migrated there in 1717 with his brother-in-law, Christopher Jones. Hobhouse was a resident of Queen Square, Bristol. Hobhouse remained unmarried all his life.

== Career ==
Although primarily a merchant, Hobhouse was voted as burgess of Minehead in the elections of 1713 and 1717 and, a year later, he became churchwarden in Minehead. He then became a free burgess in Bristol in 1724 and was a partner of a local copper company in Bristol, Joseph Pervicall and Copper Company. Additionally, he owned shares in a sugar refinery in Redcliffe, Bristol at the beginning of the eighteenth century. At the age of 39, he became a member of the Society of Merchant Venturers. When the new African Company was founded in 1750, he became a member. Hobhouse retired from business around 1757 or 1758.

=== Slavery ===
His business interests were focused on trade between England, the western coast of Africa, South Carolina, and Virginia, but Virginia was not his main trade concern. Hobhouse was the leader of the firm of Isaac Hobhouse and Company. This company arranged forty-four voyages, and Hobhouse invested in others’ slaving voyages in Bristol. The partners of his firm changed from time to time and included masters of vessels, such as Captain Owen Arnold, and planters in the West Indies, such as John Molineux of Montserrat. Another notable partner of the company was Lionel Lyde who was especially involved in the tobacco and slave trades concerning Virginia. Hobhouse would often petition the government on matters regarding the slave trade; however, he never held public office.

Hobhouse emerged as an agent for slaving voyages in the 1720s and conducted sixty-eight trans-Atlantic voyages throughout his involvement in the slave trade. At the peak of his career in 1728, Hobhouse sent five ships in that single season. In 1741 and 1743 respectively, Hobhouse sent only a single ship likely due to the conflict between Britain and France in the War of Austrian Succession. As for being a ship-owner, Hobhouse owned thirty-four vessels, including Seaflower and Amoretta. Greyhound, or Greyhound Gally, was the only ship that was used often throughout Hobhouse's career in slavery.

Hobhouse began his trading in 1722 with the vessel America. Slaves were purchased along Africa's Gold Coast, landing in Montserrat. The last Hobhouse-sponsored voyage was conducted on the Levant in 1747. Slaves were purchased within the Bight of Biafra and along the Gulf of Guinea islands with transport to Jamaica.

==== Embarked slaves ====
He purchased most slaves from the Bight of Biafra, the Gulf of Guinea Islands, and other places in Africa. The Gold Coast, West Central Africa, and St. Helena were places from where he purchased slaves the least. From Europe during 1701 to 1750, 276 slaves were purchased. From Mainland North America in that same period, 8,799 slaves were purchased. From the Caribbean, 9,451 slaves were purchased. From other places, 271 slaves were purchased. This is a total of 18,797 embarked slaves.

Specific embarkation ports were Anomabu on the Gold Coast and Bonny, Calabar, and São Tomé in the Bight of Biafra and the Gulf of Guinea islands. Of the specified embarkation ports, the most slaves were purchased in Bonny, 2,710 slaves out of a total of 18,797, or 14 percent. The fewest slaves were purchased in Anomabu, 121 slaves out of a total of 18,797, or 0.6 percent.

From 1701 to 1725 and of the only specified embarkation region, which is the Bight of Biafra and the Gulf of Guinea islands, an average of 38 percent of slaves died during the voyages. From 1701 to 1725 and of the only specified embarkation region, which is the Bight of Biafra and the Gulf of Guinea islands, an average of 60 percent were male slaves. From a number of embarkation regions during 1701 to 1750, an average of 12.9 percent were children.

==== Disembarked slaves ====
Throughout his career, he landed slaves mainly in Montserrat, Barbados, Virginia, South Carolina, Saint Kitts, Nevis, and Jamaica. The Caribbean remained a popular drop-off place for slaves throughout not only Hobhouse's career but other slave merchants' careers as well. He landed slaves once in Spain in 1734 from the Bight of Biafra and the Gulf of Guinea islands.

Of the 19,068 embarked slaves, 15,554 were disembarked, or 82 percent. According to John Latimer, profits on 270 slaves could be as high as £7,000 or £8,000 in the eighteenth century. Of the 15,554 slaves that Hobhouse disembarked in his career, the profit to Hobhouse may have been over £400,000.

Of the specified disembarkation ports, the most disembarked slaves were in Charleston, Virginia, 5,508 slaves out of a total of 18,797, or 29 percent. The least disembarked slaves were in Cádiz, Spain, 276 slaves out of a total of 18,797, or 1.5 percent.

Comparatively, Hobhouse's vessels experienced higher mortality rates to slaves in transport through the Middle Passage than his contemporaries. On one voyage, the captain of the vessel Greyhound, wrote to Hobhouse that out of 339 slaves, he only landed 214 slaves in Barbados. These slaves sold for only £40 a pair. Profit from the Greyhound voyage was estimated to be around £4,280, not the £5,548 and £6,341 expected from this voyage.

== Death ==
Hobhouse died around 20 February 1763, at his house in Queen Square.
