= Richard Shackleton Pope =

English architect

- Born: c. 1793
- Died: 10 February 1884
- Occupation: Architect
- Practice: Pope, Bindon and Clark

Richard Shackleton Pope (c. 1793 – 10 February 1884) was a British architect working mainly in Bristol. His father was a clerk of works for Sir Robert Smirke, and Pope succeeded him, also working for C.R. Cockerell. He moved to Bristol to work on one of Cockerell's projects and decided to settle in the city, where he became District Surveyor from 1831 to 1874, with considerable influence over building works.

== List of works ==
- Philosophical Institution, Park Street (1821) for Cockerell, now Freemasons' Hall
- Royal Colonnade, Great George Street (1828)
- Magistrates’ Court, Old Council House, Corn Street (1829)
- Wool Hall, (including the Fleece and Firkin Public House) St. Thomas’ Street (1828–30)
- St David's Welsh Anglican Church Feeder Road, St Phillips Marsh 1867.
- Alva House and Dorset House, Litfield Place, Clifton (1829–1830)
- Cattle market, Temple Meads. Demolished (1830)
- Ancraman's warehouse, Narrow Quay (1830), later Bush House, now the Arnolfini Gallery
- Gaol, Cumberland Road. Demolished except for gateway (1831)
- 49–50 Queen Square (1833)
- Cathedral (Bristol): chapter house restoration (1833)
- Dorset House, Bristol (1834)
- Vyvyan Terrace, Clifton (1833–47) and Coach House to the rear of Number 16.
- Brunel House, St George's Road (1837–9), possibly with Isambard Kingdom Brunel
- Church of St Peter, Oakford, Devon (1838)
- St Mary on the Quay: planned as an Irvingite church, St Augustine's Parade (1839)
- Taylor Maxwell House, Clifton (1839)
- Brunel House (Great Western Steamship Hotel) 1839
- 39–53 Apsley Road, Clifton (c. 1840)
- Buxton Villa, Richmond Park Road (1840)
- Phillip's warehouse, Queen Charlotte Street (1840). Demolished 1972.
- 2, Richmond Park Road, Clifton (c.1840)
- Rebuild of St Nicholas Church Winsley (1840)
- Buckingham Place, Queen's Road, Clifton (1843).
- Guildhall, Broad Street (1843).
- Police station, Bridewell Street (1844). Demolished c.1927.
- Buckingham Baptist Chapel, Clifton (1844–7)
- 1 and 3, Richmond Park Road, Clifton (1845)
- 5 and 7, Richmond Park Road, Clifton (1845)
- 12 and 13, Buckingham Vale, Clifton (c.1845)
- 1 to 7 Pembroke Mansions, Oakfield Road (1845)
- Burlington Buildings, Burlington Road, Whiteladies Park (1845).
- 5 and 7, Oakfield Road, Clifton (c.1845)
- 9 and 11, Oakfield Road, Clifton (c.1845)
- Fosters Chambers, Small Street (c.1846)
- Extension to the Market Chambers, St Nicholas Street (1848–49)
- 3–15 Aberdeen terrace, Cotham (Late 1840s)
- Clifton Pool and The Victoria Public House (1850)
- National Westminster Bank, Corn Street (1852–1855)
- St Philip and Jacob, Bristol (1860)
- Bristol Bridge: widening (1849). Competition win : executed 1861.
- Oakfield Road Unitarian Church (closed 1984 now offices)
- Assize Courts, Small Street (1867)
- Viaduct, Park Street (1871)
- Merchant Hall, Clifton Down 1868
- 1–9 Leicester Terrace, Clifton 1852

From about 1850 until 1869 worked in partnership at Pope, Bindon and Clark.

Then in 1870 went into partnership with his son as Pope and Son and finally Pope and Co.
