= The Merchant Venturer =

British train

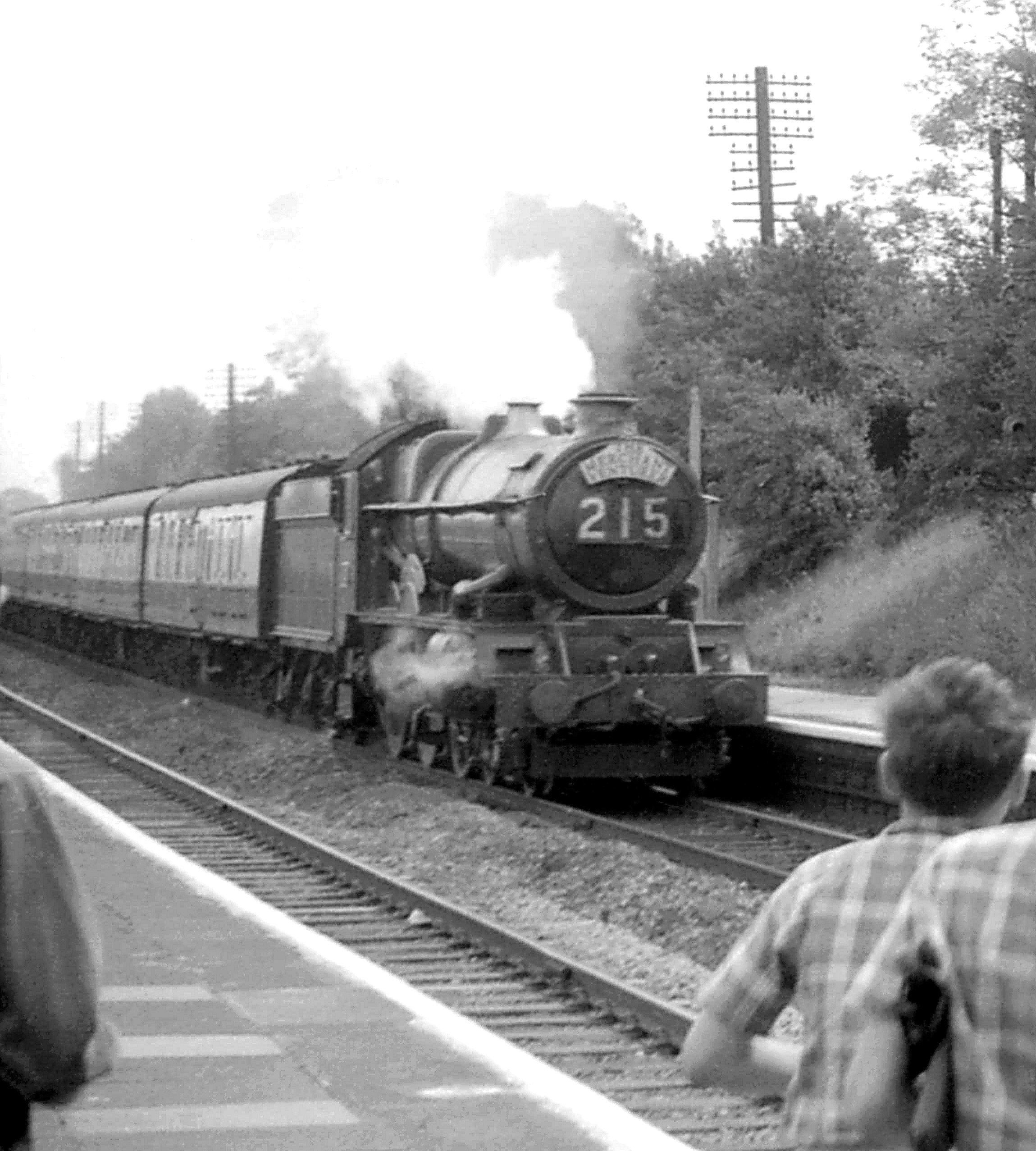
- An unidentified King class hauls the down Merchant Venturer through Ealing Broadway in 1959

Overview
- Service type: Passenger train
- First service: 3 May 1951
- Last service: 9 September 1961
- Current operator: BR (W)

Route
- Termini: London Paddington; Bristol / Weston-super-Mare
- Stops: Bath Spa
- Service frequency: Daily

The Merchant Venturer was a named train of British Railways. It ran over eleven Summer seasons from 3 May 1951 to 9 September 1961.

Together with The William Shakespeare, this began as one of two excursions from London on the Western Region, as part of the Festival of Britain. Both of them ran from London and were intended for a short trip out from the capital, to some of the cultural highlights that were the focuses of the Festival. For The Merchant Venturer this was to Bristol and beyond to Weston-super-Mare. The William Shakespeare ran to Stratford-upon-Avon. Both of them used carriages in the new carmine and cream livery of British Railways.

In December 2009, First Great Western resurrected the name for a London Paddington to Penzance via Bristol service.

== Society of Merchant Venturers ==
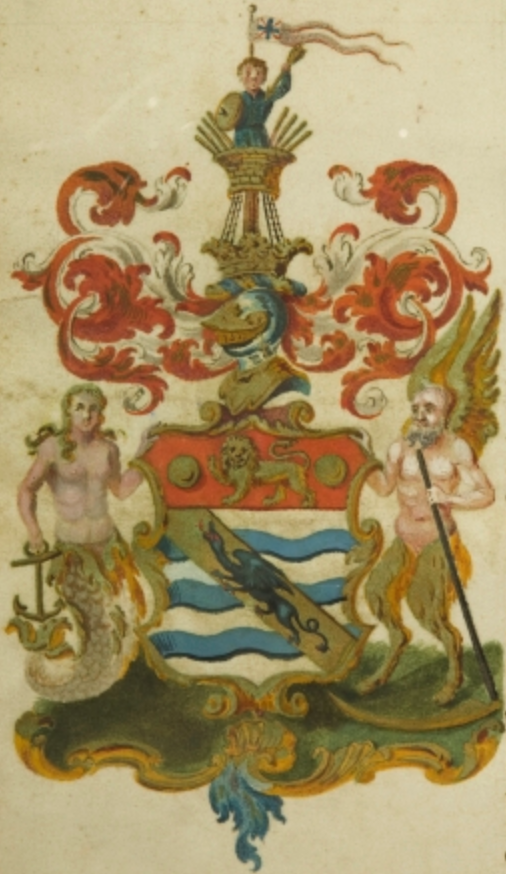
Arms of the Society, from their 1569 grant of arms

The Society of Merchant Venturers, originally 'Adventurers', is an organisation in Bristol. It grew from the medieval guild structures and received its Royal Charter in 1552. It has long been associated with maritime trade through Bristol and enforced a monopoly such that only members of the Society were permitted to trade 'beyond the seas' through Bristol. Equally they opposed monopolies when against the interests of the Society, such as when they petitioned Parliament to withdraw that of the Royal African Company in 1698, opening up the profitable slave trade for the benefit of Bristol merchants.

== Service ==
Unlike The William Shakespeare, which was a new service and only ran for one Summer, The Merchant Venturer was a new name applied to an existing service: the 11:15 from Paddington and the 4:35 return from Weston. The Shakespeare had been timed for a day out and return the same day, but a same-day return on The Merchant Venturer would only have allowed a few hours, even at Bath.

The Merchant Venturer was successful, and ran for eleven years, until 1961.

== Route ==
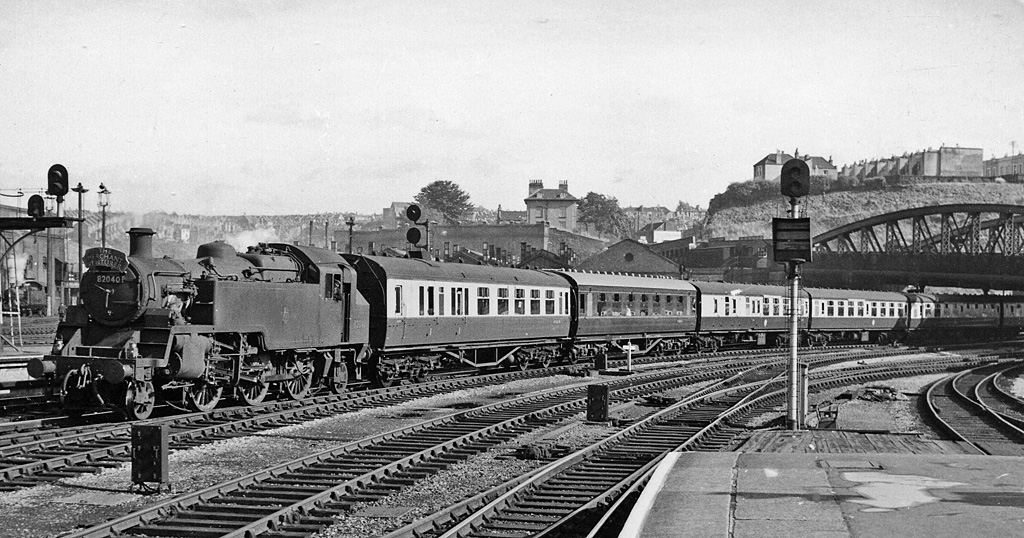
BR Standard 3MT brings the train from Weston-super-Mare into Temple Meads in 1958, where a Castle class will take over to London (Note: Although the photograph is dated in 1958, the headboard is the original up-to-1956 pattern)

The route was from London Paddington to Bristol, along the Great Western Main Line, with a stop at Bath. It then proceeded along the Bristol–Exeter line to Weston-super-Mare.

The return was by the same route, but with additional stops at Yatton and Chippenham. A slip coach was dropped at Reading, although passengers in this coach could not access the restaurant car.

At first there was also a service onwards to Taunton, by three coaches which were uncoupled at Bristol, although this seems to have only operated in the first year.

=== June 1952 timetable ===
Down
London (Paddington)	11:15
Bath Spa	1:08
Bristol (Temple Meads)	1:32
Weston-super-Mare	2:06

Up
Weston-super-Mare	4:35
Yatton	4:47
Bristol (Temple Meads)	5:25
Bath Spa	5:47
Chippenham	6:10
Reading General	7:20
London (Paddington)	8:00

=== Haulage ===
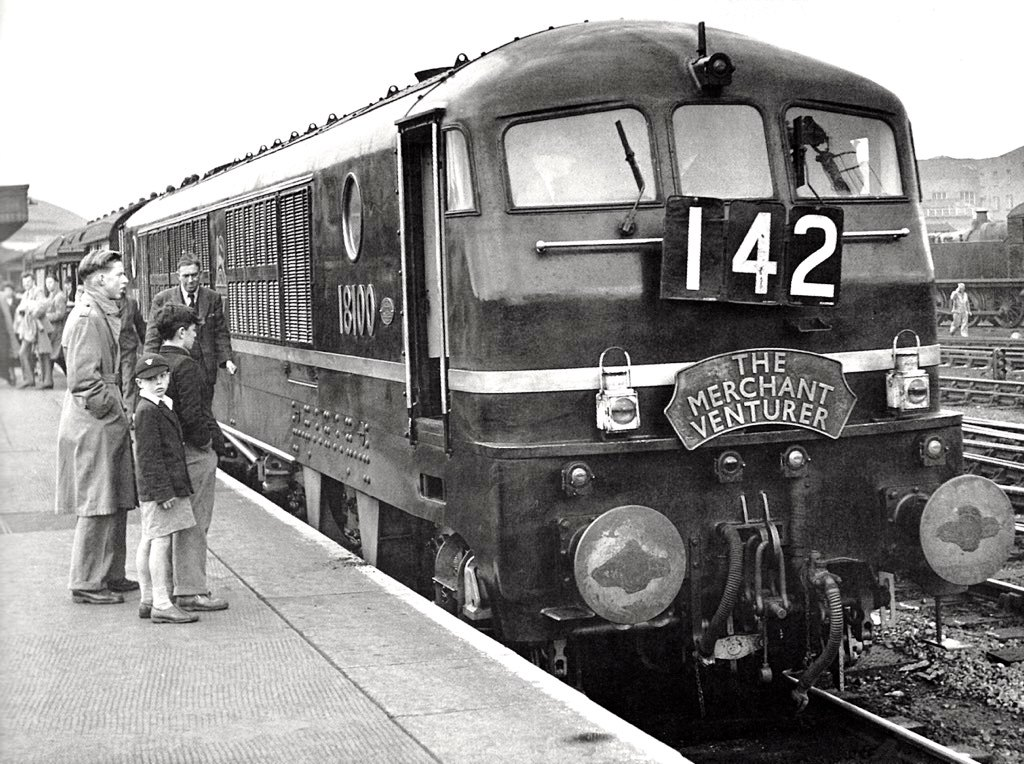
The gas-turbine locomotive 18100 at Temple Meads in 1952

The Merchant Venturer was regularly hauled by Castle-class locomotives, based at Old Oak Common. (Note: Shed code 81A) On the inaugural day, it was hauled by 7025 Sudeley Castle from London to Bristol, then 5062 Earl of Shaftesbury to Weston-super-Mare. The return Up run was made by 7019 Fowey Castle. King-class locomotives were also used from London.

The working was a regular turn for the GWR's gas-turbine locomotive 18100, until its withdrawal in 1958.

In the 1960s, diesel haulage took over and for the last years it was hauled by Warship (later Class 42) diesel-hydraulics. Timing for the last services had reached mile-a-minute timing and the 107 miles were covered in 106 minutes.

Train reporting numbers used included 142, 209 or 215 (Down) and 090 (Up). Later the 4-digit 1B09 was used.

== Headboards ==
Three headboard designs were used. The first was a British Railways Type 7 in black, with the text The Merchant Venturer across three lines.

In 1956, this headboard was either replaced or repainted. It now had dark chocolate brown letters on a light cream background.

From 1957 there was a unique new headboard design. This was in the style of the pre-war GWR designs, tightly bordered around the text and surmounted by a crest. The crest was that of the Merchant Venturers, with their motto, Indocilis Pauperium Pati (Will not learn to endure poverty).

== 2009 resurrection ==
In December 2009, First Great Western resurrected the name for a London Paddington to Penzance via Bristol service operated by an InterCity 125.
