= Thomas White (benefactor) =

English benefactor (c.1550–1624)

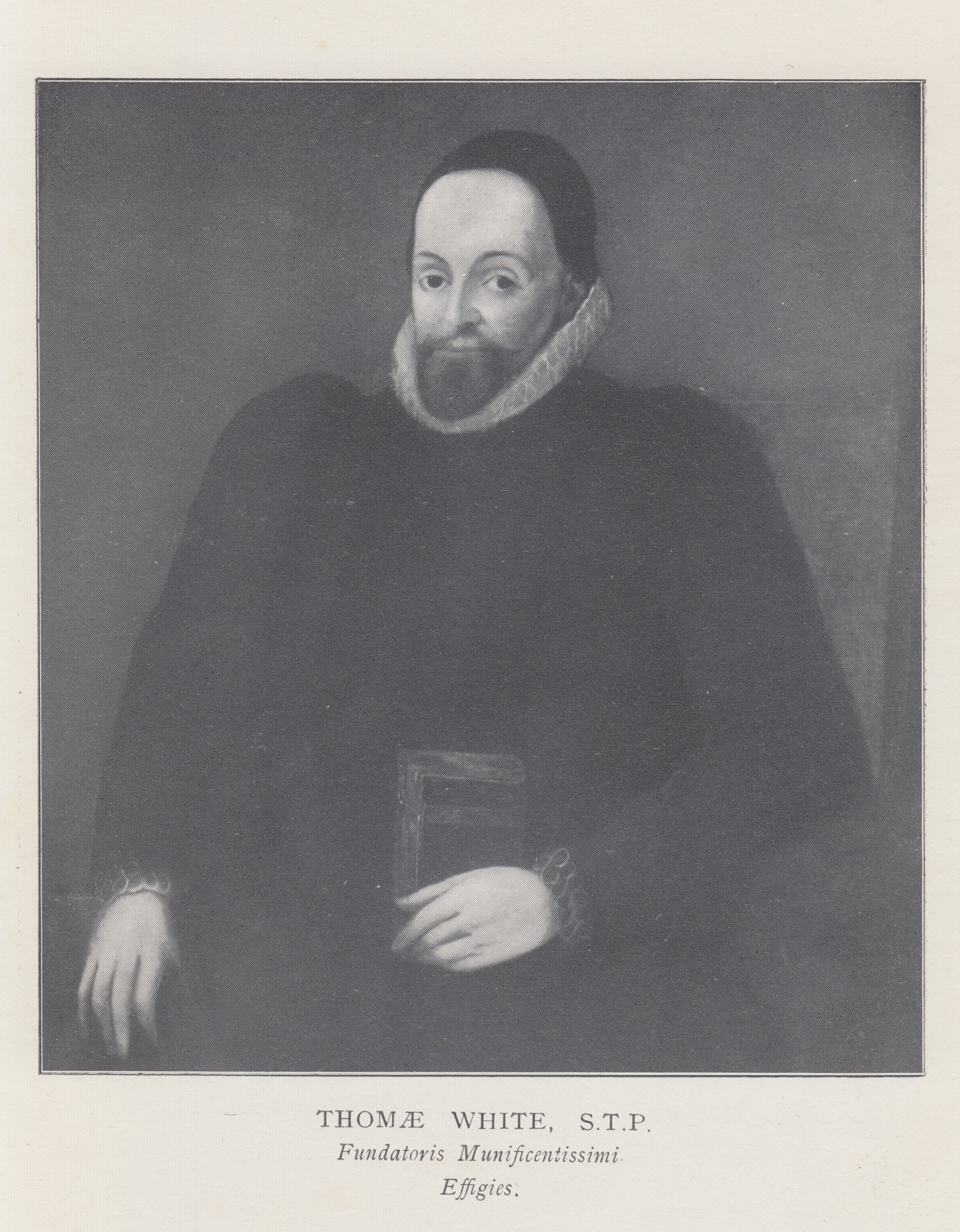
- Rev Thomas White
- Born: c.1550 Temple Parish, Bristol, England
- Died: 1 March 1624
- Occupation: Clergyman
- Known for: Philanthropy

Thomas White (c.1550–1624) was an English clergyman, founder of Sion College, London, and of White's professorship of moral philosophy at the University of Oxford. Thomas Fuller in Worthies of England acquits him of being a pluralist or usurer; he made a number of other bequests, and was noted in his lifetime for charitable gifts.

== Life ==
The son of John White, a Gloucestershire clothier, he was born about 1550 in Temple Street, Bristol. He entered as student of Magdalen Hall, Oxford, in 1566, graduated B.A. 25 June 1570, M.A. 12 October 1573, took holy orders and became a noted preacher. He moved to London, and was rector of St. Gregory by St. Paul's, a short time before being made vicar of St. Dunstan-in-the-West, 23 November 1575. On 11 December 1581 he received the degree of B.D. and that of D.D., on 8 March 1585. He was appointed treasurer of Salisbury on 21 April 1590, canon of Christ Church, Oxford, 1591, and canon of Windsor 1593.

He died on 1 March 1624, and was buried in the chancel of St. Dunstan-in-the-West, Fleet Street. Both of his wives were buried in the same church. After his death the university of Oxford honoured his memory in a public oration delivered by William Price, the first reader of the moral philosophy lecture founded by White. There was no monument to his memory until 1876, when Sion College and the trustees of the charities at Bristol caused one, designed by Arthur William Blomfield, to be erected near his grave.

== Works ==
In 1578 Francis Coldock printed for him A Sermon preached at Pawles Crosse on Sunday the ninth of December, 1576, London, in which he attacks the vices of the metropolis (pp. 45–8), and specially refers to theatre-houses and playgoing; and also 'A Sermon preached at Pawles Crosse on Sunday the thirde of Nouember, 1577, in the time of the Plague,' London. The Paul's Cross preachings against plays are referred to by Stephen Gosson (Playes confuted in Five Actions, 1590). Fuller states that White "was afterwards" related to Sir Henry Sidney, whose funeral sermon he preached. In 1589 he printed another Sermon at Paule's Crosse, preached on the queen's day.

== Legacy ==
By his will, dated 1 October 1623, besides a long list of smaller legacies, he left money for lectureships at St. Paul's, at St. Dunstan's, and one for the Newgate prisoners; but his chief bequest was £3,000 for the purchase of premises 'fit to make a college for a corporation of all the ministers, parsons, vicars, lecturers, and curates within London and suburbs thereof; as also for a convenient house or place fast by, to make a convenient almeshouse for twenty persons, viz. ten men and ten women.' This was afterwards known as Sion College, designed as a guild of the clergy of the city of London and its suburbs, placing them in the same position as most other callings and professions who enjoyed charters of incorporation, and with common privileges and property. To the exertions of John Simpson, his cousin, and one of his executors are chiefly due the charter obtained in 1630 incorporating the college, and also the erection of the building at London Wall in 1629, where the library remained until it moved to a new building on the Victoria Embankment in 1886. Simpson was the builder and founder of the major library of the institution.

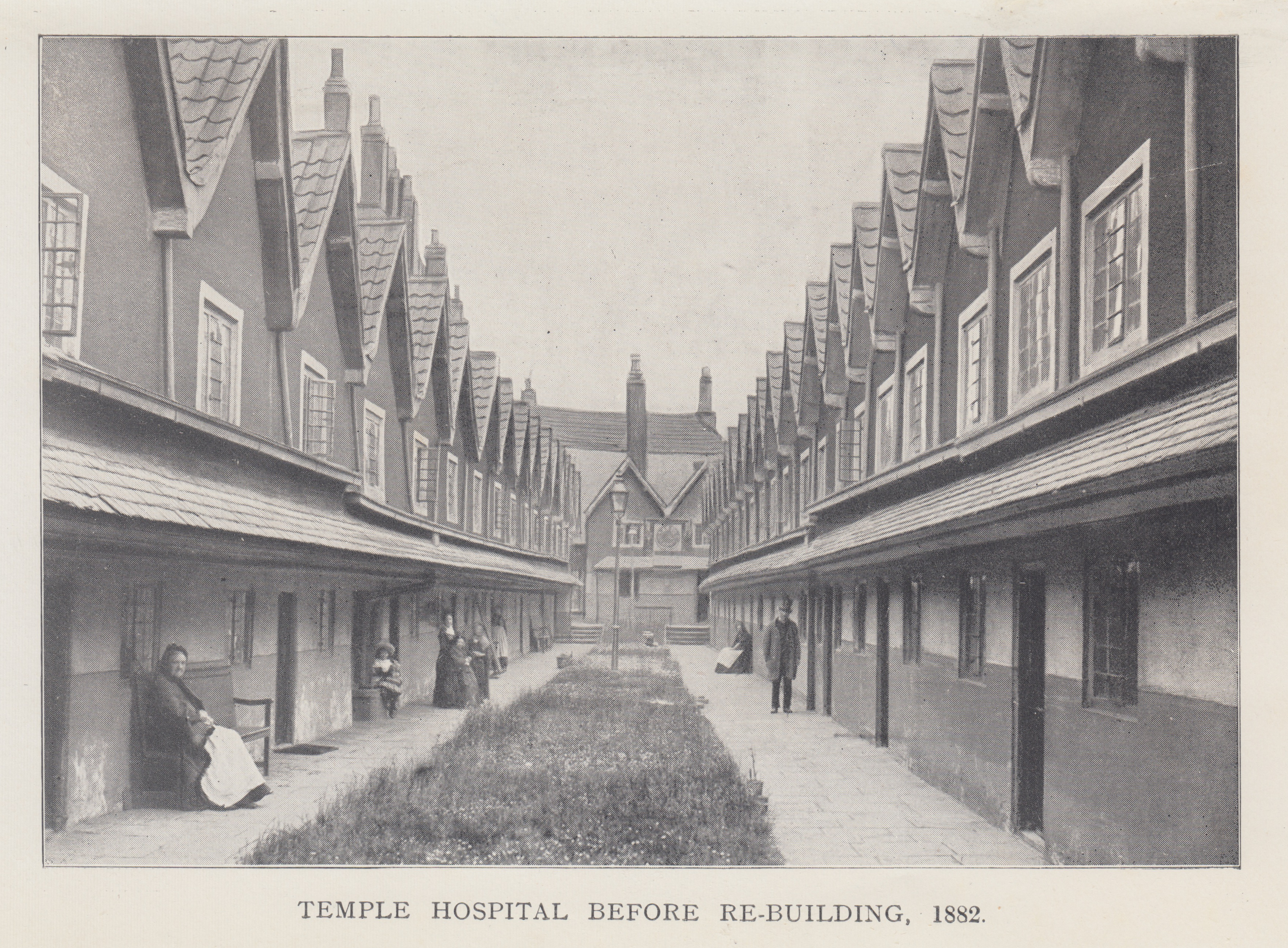
Temple Hospital, Bristol, before rebuilding, 1882

In 1613 he erected and endowed a hospital in Temple St., Bristol, called the Temple Hospital, for eight men and two women, and one man and one woman were afterwards added by himself. In 1622 he gave to Bristol houses in Gray's Inn Lane, London, to support various charities. He had friendly relations with the Merchant Taylors' Company; White in his will made the company nominators to eight out of the twenty places provided in his almshouses at Sion College, and the company were also connected as auditors with the moral philosophy lecture which he had founded at Oxford in 1621. Five exhibitions were made for scholars of Magdalen Hall, and the manor of Langdon Hill, Essex, was conveyed to the university.

He requested John Vicars, John Downeham, and John Simpson to examine and perfect his manuscript sermons and lectures on the Hebrews, and print them, as well as a volume of 'Miscellanea,' from his papers. These two wishes were not carried out.
