= Bristol Guildhall =

Former municipal building in Bristol, England

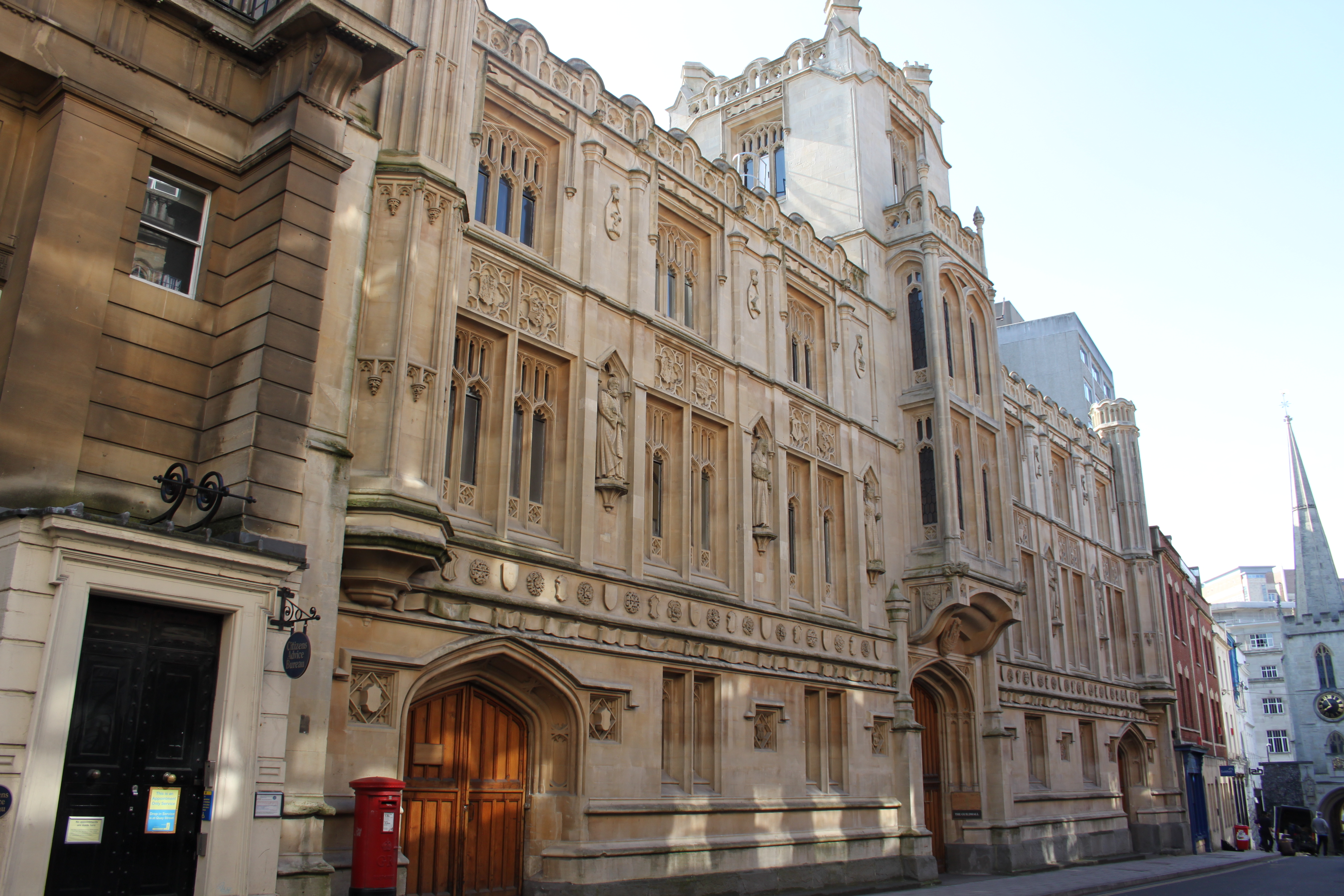

- Location within Bristol

General information
- Architectural style: Gothic Revival style
- Location: Bristol, England
- Coordinates: 51.4553°N 2.5945°W
- Year built: 1846

Design and construction
- Architect: Richard Shackleton Pope

Listed Building – Grade II*
- Official name: Guildhall
- Designated: 4 March 1977
- Reference no.: 1282368

Bristol Guildhall is a former municipal building on Broad Street in Bristol, England. It is a Grade II* listed building. It was built in the 1840s on the site of the previous guildhall and used as a courthouse from the 1860s to 1993. Various plans for its use as an art gallery and hotel were then proposed. In March 2020, it was damaged by a fire which led to its roof collapsing; as of 2025 it is being converted into a spa hotel and due to open in early 2026.

== History ==
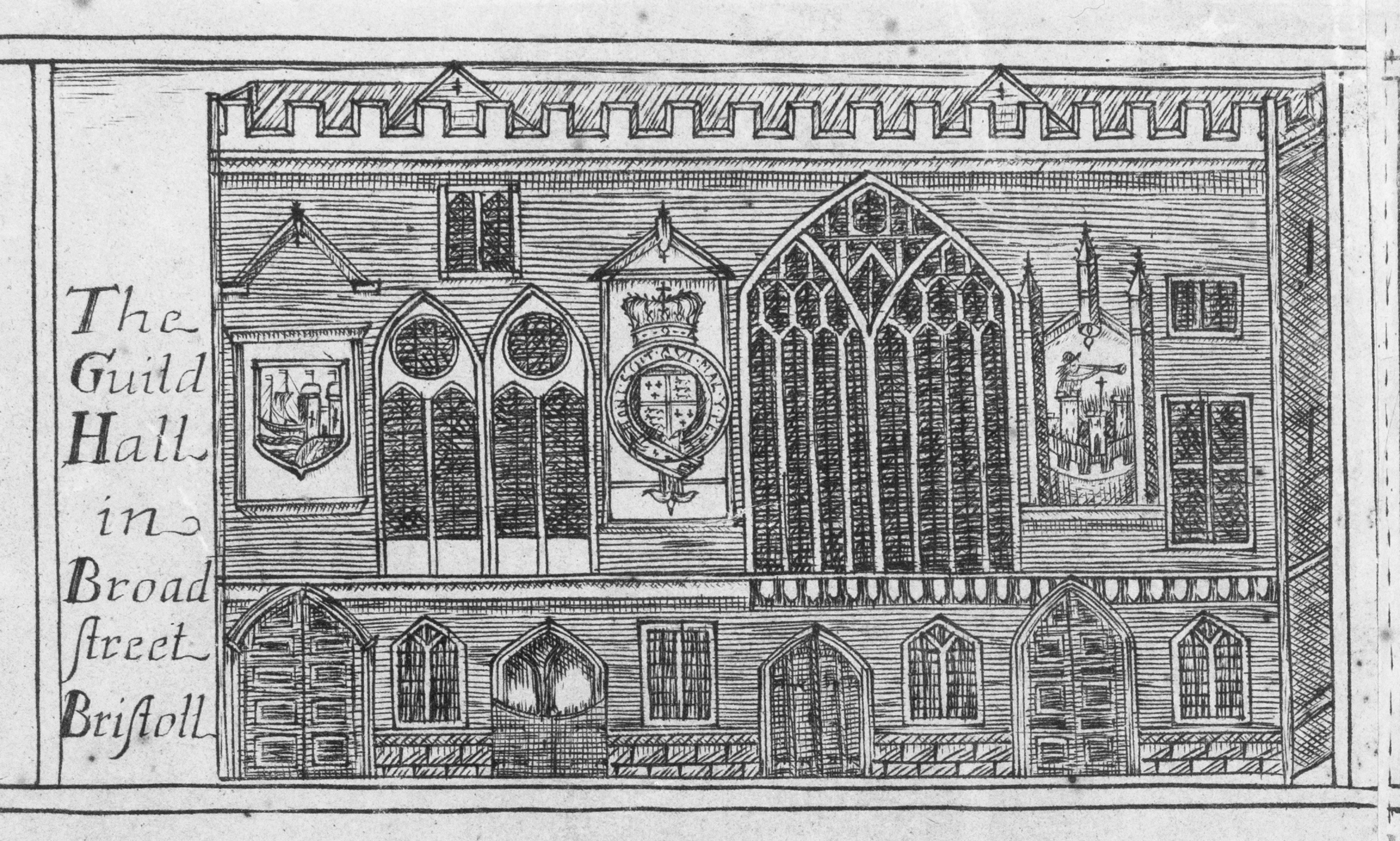
The earlier Guild Hall on Broad Street, Bristol

An earlier guildhall was built for a Guild of Merchants on the site in the 13th century. The current building, which was designed by Richard Shackleton Pope in the Gothic Revival style, was completed in 1846, incorporating fragments of the earlier Guildhall on the site. The building included statues created by John Thomas of Bristol and stained glass from Rogers of Worcester.

It was extended, to designs by T. S. Pope and J. Bindon, to accommodate the assize courts in 1867. After judicial activities transferred to the new Bristol Crown Court building in 1993, the guildhall was converted into an art gallery. Some of the old court rooms were panelled with varnished plywood. The building, particularly 'Leech's Room' suffered bomb damage during World War II and was rebuilt in 1960. In 2013 plans were unveiled to turn the building into a hotel.

On 15 March 2020, a fire occurred in the building. Around 50 firefighters and ten appliances from Bristol and the surrounding area attended and pumped water from Bristol Harbour to tackle the blaze. Because of structural damage the firefighters were withdrawn from the building and tackled it from outside. The fire started in the roof space. The roof collapsed spreading the fire to the rest of the building. The fire was extinguished by 09:00 and no-one was injured. The fire was treated as suspicious by Avon and Somerset Police.

In 2023 restoration works began to transform the fire-damaged Guildhall into a spa hotel with 75 bedrooms and a rooftop pool. It is scheduled to open in early 2026.

== Architecture ==
The three-storey limestone building with an attic and basement has a slate roof. The symmetrical front of the building has a plinth, cornice and parapet. The statues on the first floor are of Queen Victoria, Edward III, Michael Foster and John Dunning, and Edward Colston and John Whitson.

== See also ==
- Grade II* listed buildings in Bristol
