= Alderman Proctor's Drinking Fountain =

1872 drinking fountain in Bristol, England

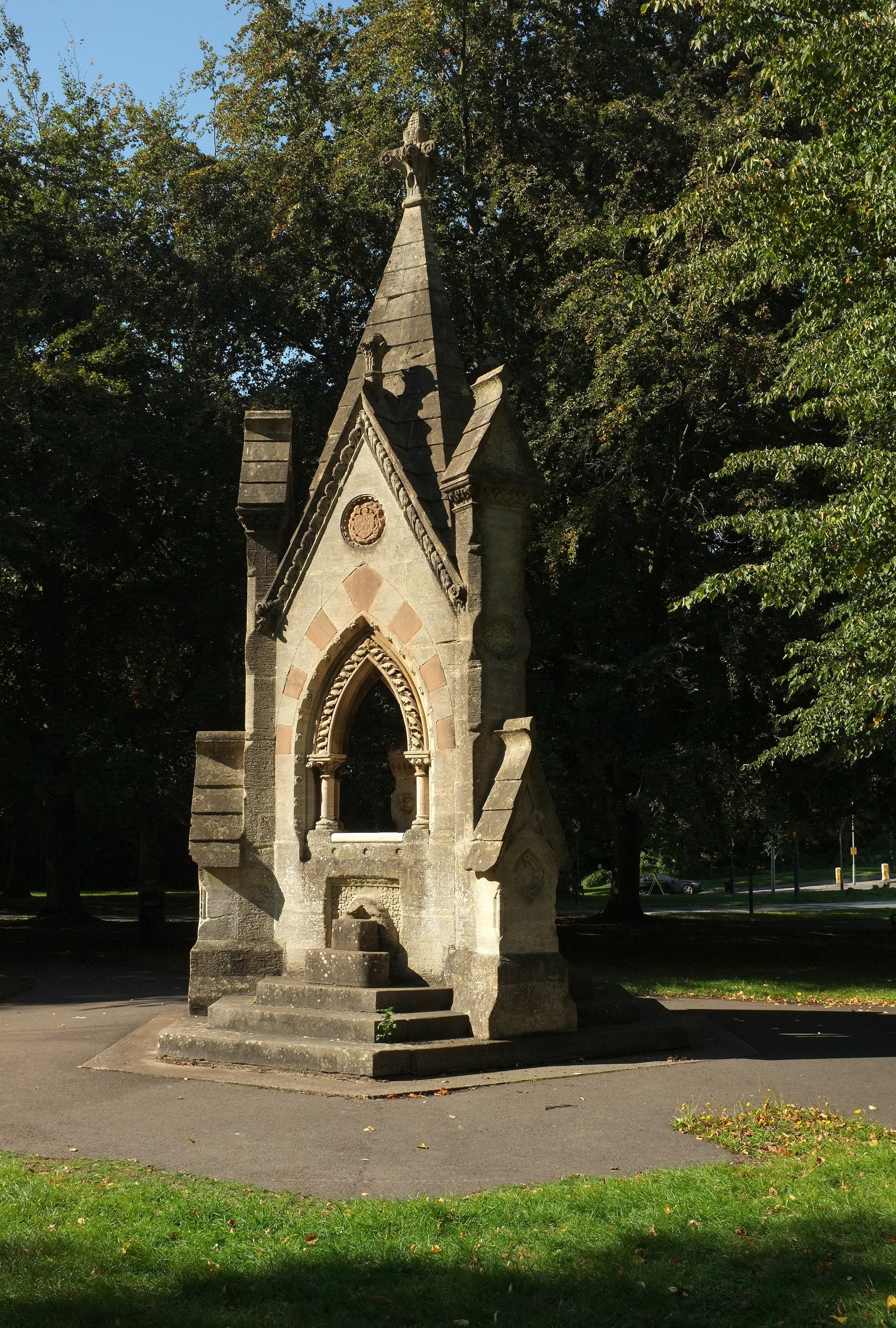

- Location within Bristol

General information
- Architectural style: Gothic Revival
- Location: Bristol, England
- Coordinates: 51.461609°N 2.625837°W
- Completed: 1872
- Client: Society of Merchant Venturers

Design and construction
- Architects: G and H Godwin

The Alderman Proctor's Drinking Fountain (grid reference ST566738) is a historic building on Clifton Down, Bristol, England.

The city of Bristol began supplying municipal drinking water in 1858. To inform the public about the new water supply, Robert Lang made a proposal through the Bristol Times that public drinking fountains be constructed. Lang began the "Fountain Fund" in January 1859 with a donation of one hundred pounds. By 1906, there were more than 40 public drinking fountains throughout the city.

In 1872, Alderman Thomas Proctor commissioned the firm of George and Henry Godwin to build the fountain to commemorate the 1861 presentation of Clifton Down to the City of Bristol by the Society of Merchant Venturers. (Note: Thomas Proctor (1811–1876) also hired the firm of George and Henry Godwin to construct his own home, Elmdale, in 1867. Thomas donated the home to the city of Bristol in 1874 to serve as the Mansion House, or official home of Bristol's Lord Mayor.)

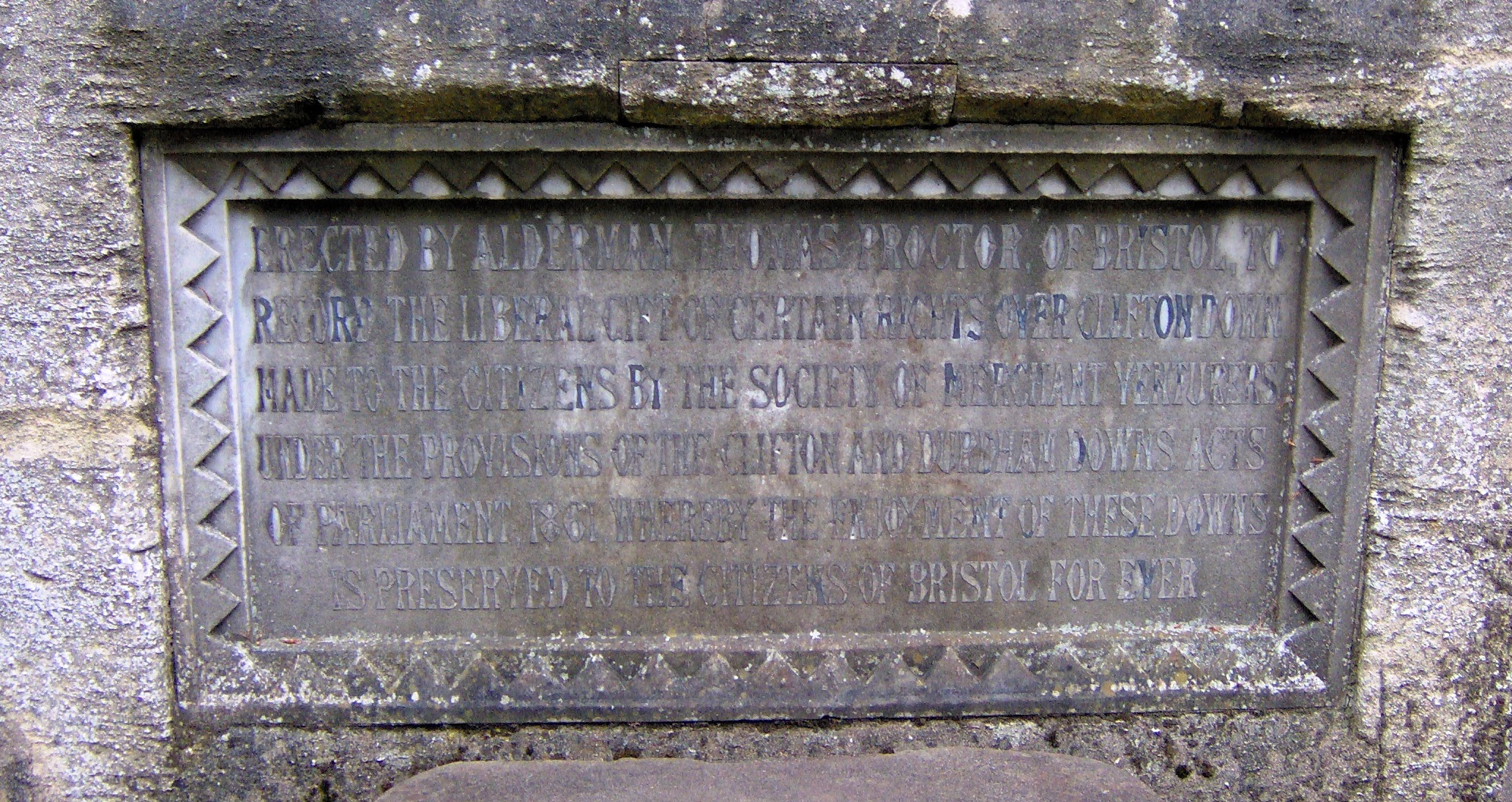
Commemorative plaque

The three-sided fountain is done in Gothic Revival style. The main portion is of limestone with pink marble columns and white marble surround. The commemorative plaque is of black lettering on white marble; the plaque reads, "Erected by Alderman Thomas Proctor, of Bristol to record the liberal gift of certain rights on Clifton Down made to the citizens by the Society of Merchant Venturers under the provision of the Clifton and Drudham Downs Acts of Parliament, 1861, whereby the enjoyment of these Downs is preserved to the citizens of Bristol for ever." The fountain bears the coat of arms for the city of Bristol, the Society of Merchant Venturers, and that of Alderman Thomas Proctor.

The fountain was originally situated at the head of Bridge Valley Road. It became a sight impediment to modern auto traffic in the late 20th century. The fountain was moved to the other side of the road, closer to the Mansion House in 1987. After the move, it underwent restoration and was re-dedicated on 1 May 1988. It has been designated by English Heritage as a grade II listed building since 1977.

== Sources ==
- Arrowsmith, J. W. (1906). Arrowsmith's Dictionary of Bristol. J. W. Arrowsmith.
- Foyle, Andrew; Cherry, Bridget (2004). Bristol. Yale University Press. p. 235. ISBN 978-0-3001-0442-4. "Alderman Proctor's Drinking Fountain."
