= Society of Merchant Venturers =

Charitable organisation in Bristol, UK

- Formation: 13th century
- Type: Not-for-profit
- Purpose: Helping communities across Greater Bristol to thrive
- Headquarters: Merchants' Hall, Clifton Down
- Location: Bristol
- Official language: English
- Master: David Freed
- Website: Society of Merchant Venturers

The Society of Merchant Venturers is a charitable organisation in the English city of Bristol. The society can be traced back to a 13th-century guild which went on to fund the 15th-century voyage of John Cabot to Canada. In 1552, it gained a monopoly on sea trading from Bristol from its first royal charter. For centuries it had almost been synonymous with the government of Bristol, especially Bristol Harbour. In recent times, the society's activities have centred on charitable agendas.

The society played a part in the development of Bristol, including the building of Clifton Suspension Bridge and the Great Western Railway. It also influenced the development of educational institutions in Greater Bristol, including University of Bristol, University of the West of England, University of Bath, City of Bristol College, Merchants' Academy, Montpelier High School and Wells Cathedral School.

== History ==
A Guild of Merchants was founded in Bristol by the 13th century, and swiftly became active in civic life. It funded John Cabot's voyage of discovery to Newfoundland in 1497. In 1552 the society received a Royal Charter from Edward VI granting a monopoly on Bristol's sea trade. The society remained in effective control of Bristol's harbour until 1809. Further charters were granted by Charles I, Charles II, and Elizabeth II. The society's members were active in the English colonisation of North America, helping to establish the Bristol's Hope and Cuper's Cove settlements in Newfoundland.

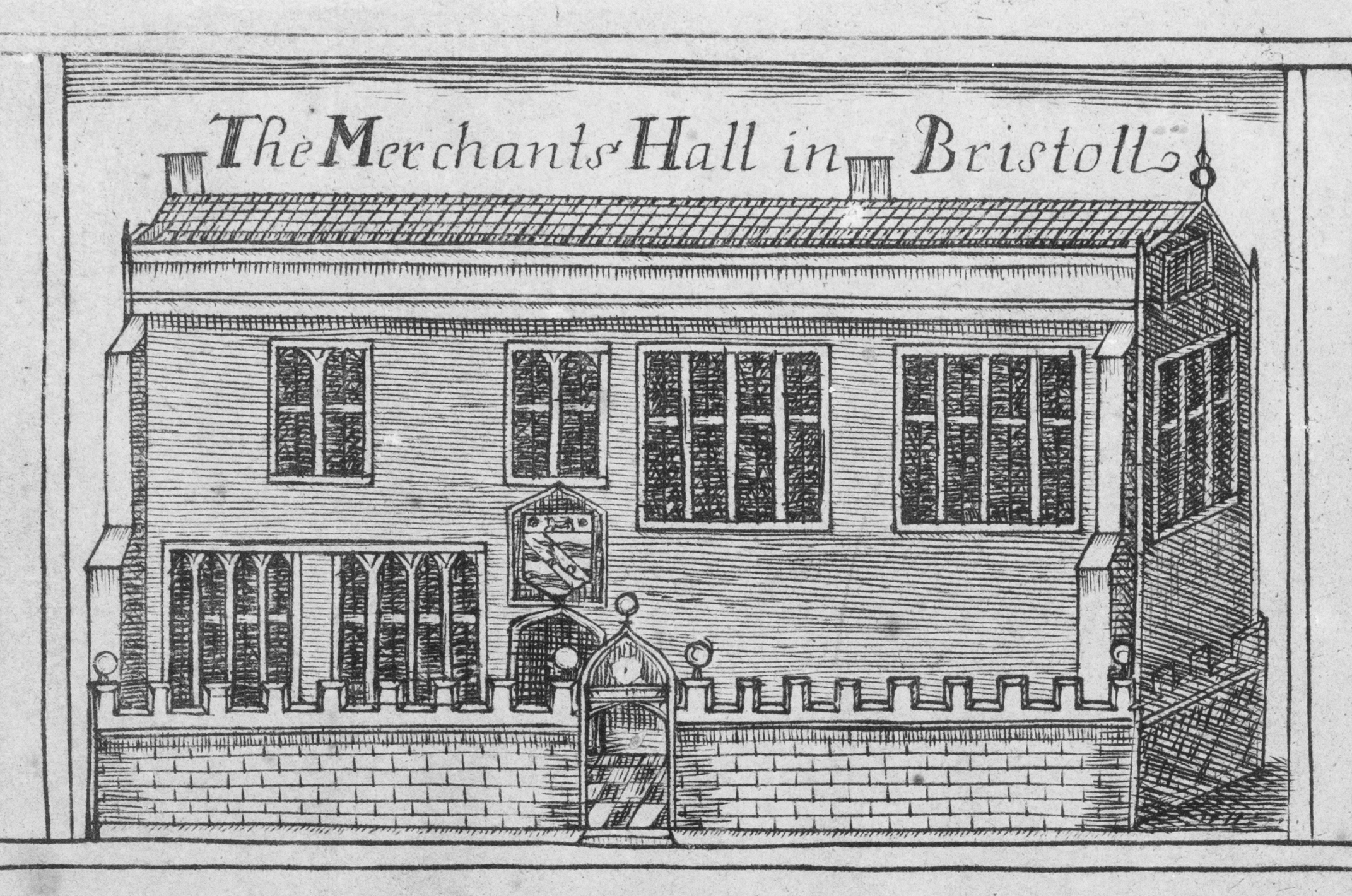
The Merchants Hall in Bristoll (1673) on King's Street

From the accession of William III in 1689, the society promoted trade protectionism which resulted in Parliament enacting policies such as restricting exports from Ireland and banning imports into Ireland from anywhere except England 'with deplorable results'.

In 1698 the society successfully lobbied Parliament to open up the slave trade to all subjects of the Crown. Over the next fifty years, the society joined with the city corporation and Bristol MPs in fighting numerous attempts to restore London's monopoly. Joseph Harford, a member of the society who became Master in 1796, was both a banker and a brass manufacturer, and thus a beneficiary of the trade. Harford was also the first chairman in 1788 of Bristol's provincial committee for the abolition of slavery.

During the 18th century one quarter of the members of the society were directly involved in the slave trade, including Michael Becher, Edward Colston, John Duckenfield, and Isaac Hobhouse. In 2022 the society commissioned an independent history report, led by historian Dr Richard Stone from the University of Bristol, to examine the role of the Society of Merchant Venturers, and individual members of the society, in the transatlantic trafficking and enslavement of Africans. The report was published in 2024.

The first light on the island of Flat Holm was a simple brazier mounted on a wooden frame, which stood on the high eastern part of the island. In 1733 the Society of Merchant Venturers of Bristol found the brazier to be unreliable and petitioned the general lighthouse authority, Trinity House, for an actual lighthouse, but the petition failed. In 1735 William Crispe of Bristol submitted a proposal to build a lighthouse at his own expense. This initial proposal also failed but negotiations resumed in 1736 when 60 soldiers drowned after their vessel crashed on the Wolves rocks near Flat Holm. Following the disaster, the Society of Merchant Venturers supported William Crispe's proposal. Crispe agreed to pay £800 (equivalent to £110,552 or $220,241 in 2008) for the construction of the tower, as well as for the associated fees and permits. The construction of the tower finished in 1737 and it began operating on 25 March 1738.

The costs of the construction of Bristol's Floating Harbour, completed in 1809, were far beyond the limited resources of the society and necessitated the setting up of the Bristol Docks Company. Although the society was represented on the board, it ceded its role in the management of the port of Bristol, which had dominated its activities throughout the seventeenth and eighteenth centuries.

In the 19th century the society helped to fund the building of Clifton Suspension Bridge and members of the society helped to establish the Great Western Railway. In the 1860s the society acted with the Bristol Corporation to put Clifton Down and the adjoining Durdham Down under the control of a single Downs Committee. The society's members wanted to protect the land from future development and ensure that it remained available to the people of the city. The creation of the Downs Act in 1861 brought together Clifton Down with Durdham Down, setting out a long-term partnership to protect this open green space. Representatives from Bristol City Council and members of the society form the Downs Committee which meets regularly to ensure that the Downs is maintained and improved for the long term. Alderman Proctor's Drinking Fountain on Clifton Down was built in 1872 by G. and H. Godwin in a Gothic Revival style to commemorate the society's presentation in 1861 of "certain rights over Clifton Down made to the citizens" of Bristol.

The society contributed a total sum of £26 towards the construction of the statue of Edward Colston, which was completed in 1895 – 170 years after Colston's death. With growing awareness in the late 20th century of his involvement in the Bristol slave trade, there were protests and petitions for changes to institutions named after Colston, alterations to the statue's plaque, or for the statue to be removed, culminating in June 2020, when the statue was toppled and dumped in Bristol Harbour by Black Lives Matter protesters. After the statue was toppled, the Merchant Venturers issued a statement saying that the organisation was "deeply sorry for its historic part in the suffering of every man, woman and child resulting from this abhorrent trade in human lives." The statement also described Bristol's role in the transatlantic trafficking and enslavement of African people as "a shameful part of the city’s history".

In the 16th century the society had maintained a free school for mariners' children under the Merchants' Hall in King Street. A century later sailors were being instructed in the 'Arte of Navigacion'. This was to evolve into the Merchant Venturers' Technical College in Unity Street towards the end of the 19th century when over 2,500 students were enrolled. When University College, Bristol achieved its charter as the University of Bristol in 1909, the Merchant Venturers' Technical College provided the faculty of engineering, whilst the remaining departments of the college eventually became:

- University of Bath (via Bristol College of Science and Technology)
- University of the West of England (via Bristol Polytechnic)
- City of Bristol College (via Brunel Technical College)

At the beginning of the 18th century the society took on Edward Colston's 'Colston's Hospital', a school for 100 boys (now Colston's School). This moved to Stapleton in 1861, becoming co-educational in 1991. In 1891 Colston's Girls' School (now Montpelier High School) was opened on Cheltenham Road using funds from Edward Colston's endowment. It became an academy in 2008, when Withywood School reopened as Merchants' Academy. In 2016 the Bristol Autism Free School, now called Venturers' Academy, opened nearby. In 2017 the society and the University of Bristol jointly sponsored five primary schools, a secondary school, an all-through school and a special school in Bristol. The overarching Venturers' Trust oversaw the education of more than 3,200 students and in 2022, with the support of the Department for Education, Venturers Trust made the decision to merge with a larger multi-academy trust that would bring greater expertise, capacity, resources and funding to each of the schools. In 2023, E-ACT was chosen because of its excellent track record of school improvement and its strong moral purpose of addressing inequality through education. The merger was finalised in 2024.

The Merchant Venturers cared for twelve poor mariners in the 16th century and the society continues to be involved with the care for older people. The society has managed Colstons Almshouses on St Michael's Hill since its foundation by Edward Colston in 1696. Since 1922 the society has been the endowment trustee for the independent charity, the St Monica Trust, enabling very substantial developments to accommodate older people in recent years. The Society has also been sole trustee of the Cote Charity, set up in 1968, which in 2009 opened Katherine House, a residential care home and in 2016, Griffiths House for those living with dementia.

== Involvement in the slave trade ==
Some of the society's members were active participants in the transatlantic slave trade from the 17th century until the 18th century.

=== Edward Colston's membership ===
The society says that Edward Colston became a member of the slave trading Royal African Company in 1680 and joined the society in 1683, continuing to live in London and attending two meetings during his membership.

== Archives ==
Records of the Society of Merchant Venturers including foundation and membership, administrative, financial, charities, education, estates management, trade, associated clubs and societies, the Seamen's Hospital Fund, and various name indexes are held at Bristol Archives (Ref. SMV) (online catalogue) as well as further papers and correspondence related to the Society of Merchant Venturers' interests (Ref. 12152) (online catalogue). Other deeds and estate papers related to the society's interests in Somerset and Dorset are available at Somerset Heritage Centre.

== Current status ==
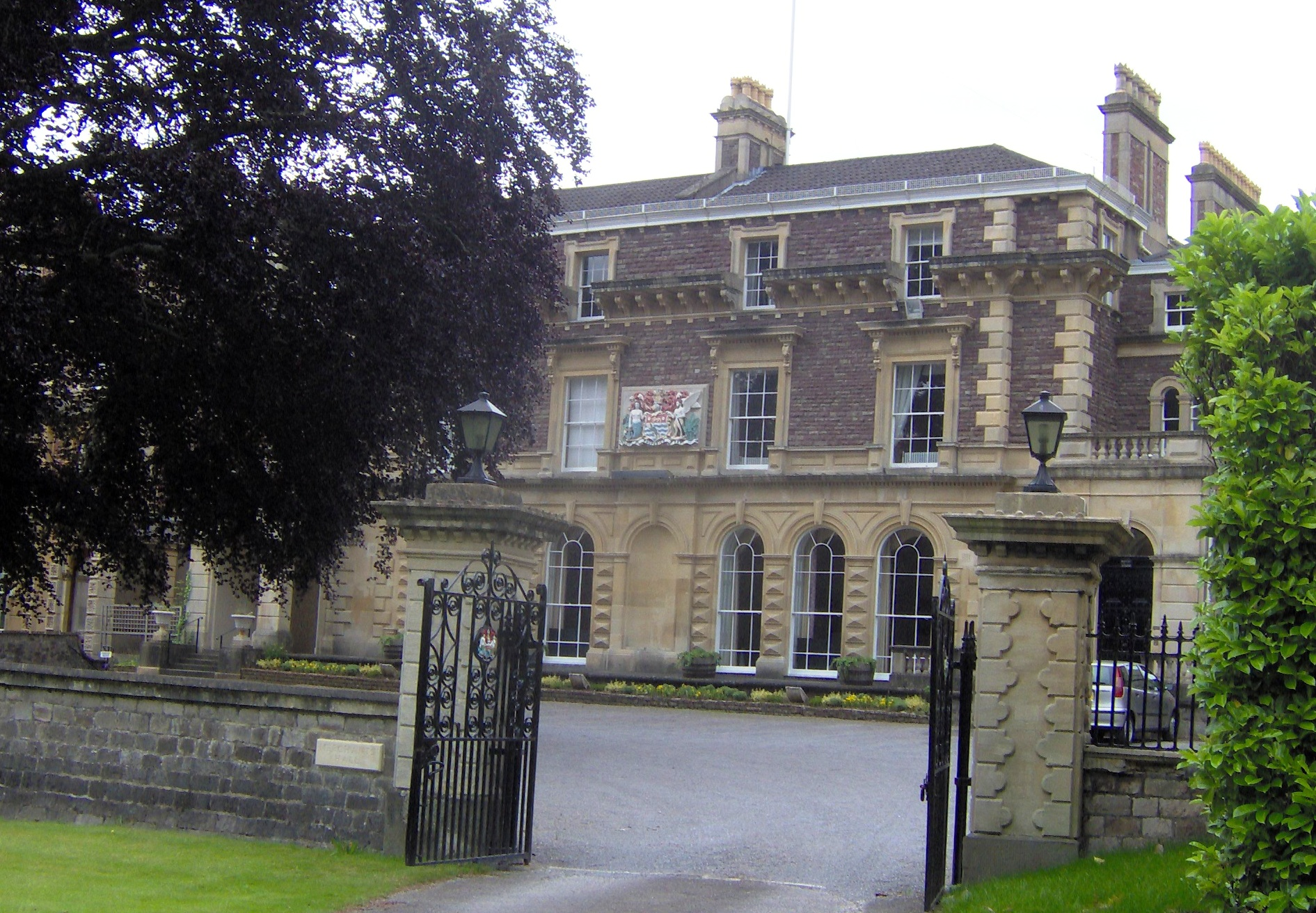
Merchants' Hall on Clifton Down.

The Society of Merchant Venturers has a long history of supporting young people and caring for older people in the Greater Bristol region, as well as protecting the long-term future of the Downs for the people of Bristol.

Members volunteer their skills and expertise to progress the society's charitable work. The society also collaborates with many other organisations to help improve opportunities for the citizens of Bristol through mentoring programmes, social enterprise and charitable giving.

Its objectives are to:

- Help communities across Greater Bristol to thrive by working collaboratively with others to improve the quality of life for everyone, particularly the young, aged and disadvantaged.
- Work collaboratively with others to provide young people with access to equal opportunities that will broaden horizons and lead to brighter futures.
- Support social enterprise, commercial and community activities across the region to improve opportunities and remove barriers so that everyone is able to take part in creating a healthy, successful and inclusive society.
- Make wise, responsible and transparent decisions relating to the charitable trusts, heritage, ancient buildings and open spaces for which the society is the steward or custodian.

== Criticisms ==
According to an article in local magazine Venue in 2002, many members were not active in charity. However, the society says that the qualification for potential members is being "prominent in their own sphere of business and active in the charitable or public life of the area". There were no female full members of the society until 2003 (though Margaret Thatcher had earlier been made an honorary member), and no ethnic minority members until 2017 when Mohammed Saddiq, executive director of Wessex Water, was appointed; followed by Marti Burgess in 2020, a partner at Bevan Brittan. In 2020, the society issued a statement saying that: "Alongside accelerating other changes within SMV, we are committed to diversifying our membership and increasing the transparency of our activities." Since that time, the society's membership has become more diverse, evidenced by a membership list with individual member bios published on its website, along with governance and accountability information.

Venue said that the Merchant Venturers control 12 charities and 40 trust funds, and also a private unlimited company, SMV Investments, that has major investments in defence contracting, tobacco, genetically modified agriculture and the petroleum industry. Merchant Venturers serve on the boards of many local charitable and cultural organisations, and are guaranteed seats on the University of Bristol Court and the Downs Committee. It quotes Paul Burton of the university's School of Policy Studies as saying, "they exert quite a bit of influence and we, the people of Bristol, don't know much about them and can't hold them to account".

In January 2022 Thangam Debbonaire, the MP for Bristol West whose constituency includes the Merchants’ headquarters in Clifton, told the Bristol Post that she believed it was time for the society to disband, calling them an "unaccountable, undemocratic network with no place in a modern, multicultural Bristol".

=== Statue of Edward Colston ===
On 7 June 2020, during international Black Lives Matter demonstrations provoked by the murder of George Floyd, a group of protestors in Bristol pulled down the 1895 statue of Edward Colston that stood in Magpie Park in The Centre, Bristol, objecting to the veneration of Edward Colston, a slave-trader, and pushed it into the harbour. During ensuing debate over the legitimacy of this act, the Society of Merchant Venturers was accused of having used its influence to block previous attempts to remove the statue legally. In response to the statue's removal, a spokesperson for the Merchant Venturers promised the society would "continue to educate itself about systemic racism". In 2022 the society commissioned an independent history report, led by historian Dr Richard Stone from the University of Bristol, to examine the role of the Society of Merchant Venturers, and individual members of the society, in the transatlantic trafficking and enslavement of Africans. The report was published in 2024.

== Heraldry ==
The company's arms are blazoned as follows:

- Arms: Barry wavy of eight argent and azure, on a bend or, a dragon passant with wings indorsed and tail extended vert, on achief gules, a lion passant guardant of the third, between two bezants.
- Crest: In a ducal coronet or, a main-mast of the last with pennon flying argent, charged with a cross gules, on the round top a man in armour proper, on his dexter arm a truncheon, his sinister hand supporting a carved shield of the second, from the round top six pike staves, three on each side issuing bendways of the first, the rigging from the round top to the coronet sable.
- Supporters: The dexter, a mermaid in the sea, all proper crined or, the middle fins at the joining of the bodies of the last, holding in her sinister hand a mirror of the first, and supporting with her dexter hand an anchor of the second, cabled proper: the sinister supporter, a winged satyr proper standing on a mount vert, winged and legged or, holding in his sinister hand a scythe the blade in base, all proper.
- Motto: Indocilis pauperiem pati.

The motto Indocilis pauperiem pati (Will not learn to endure poverty) is from the Odes of Horace. In 2017, the society removed this motto from its crest.

luctantem Icariis fluctibus Africum
mercator metuens otium et oppidi
laudat rura sui; mox reficit rates
quassas, indocilis pauperiem pati.

A merchant fearing the African wind
wrestling the Icarian sea praises leisure and
the fields of his own town; soon he repairs the battered
ships, not taught to suffer poverty.

== See also ==
- Merchant Venturers Almshouses
- The Merchant Venturer, passenger train from London to Bristol and Weston-super-Mare, running from 1951 to 1961
- Notable present and past members in the category Members of the Society of Merchant Venturers
- Livery companies in England
